= Goniothalamus gabriacianus =

Scientific classification
- Kingdom: Plantae
- Clade: Tracheophytes
- Clade: Angiosperms
- Clade: Magnoliids
- Order: Magnoliales
- Family: Annonaceae
- Genus: Goniothalamus
- Species: G. gabriacianus

Binomial name
- Goniothalamus gabriacianus (Baill.) Ast

Synonyms
- Goniothalamus gabriacianus var. coriaceifolius Bân; Goniothalamus saigonensis Pierre ex Finet & Gagnep. Oxymitra gabriaciana Baill.

Species of plant in the soursop family

Goniothalamus gabriacianus is a species of plant in the family Annonaceae. It is native to Cambodia, the province of Hainan China, Laos, Thailand and Vietnam. Henri Ernest Baillon the French botanist who first formally described the species using the basionym Oxymitra gabriaciana, named it after Paul-Pierre Gabriac, a French civil servant in Vietnam, who provided one of the specimens that he examined.

== Description ==
It is a bush reaching 3 to 4 meters (9.8 to 13.1 ft) in height. Its smooth, striated, gray branches have sparse fine hairs when young. Its membranous, broad, lance-shaped leaves are 8–22 by 3–6.5 centimeters and come to a tapering point at their tip. Both surfaces of the leaves are smooth, the upper surfaces are shiny, and the lower surface is more pallid. Its smooth, wrinkled petioles are 1 centimeter long and have a channel on their upper side. Its solitary flowers are axillary and born on 0.5 centimeter-long pedicels. It has 3 sepals that are 5 millimeters long and come to a point at their tip. The sepals are sparsely hairy on the outside and smooth on the inside. Its 6 petals are arranged in two rows of 3. The fleshy, oval outer petals are 12 millimeters long and have course rust-colored hairs. The inner petals are 9–10 millimeters long. Its flowers have numerous stamens with linear anthers. Its flowers have numerous carpels. Its ovaries have 2 locules.

=== Reproductive biology ===
The pollen of G. gabriacianus is shed as permanent tetrads.

== Habitat and distribution ==
It has been observed growing along river banks and on mountains.
