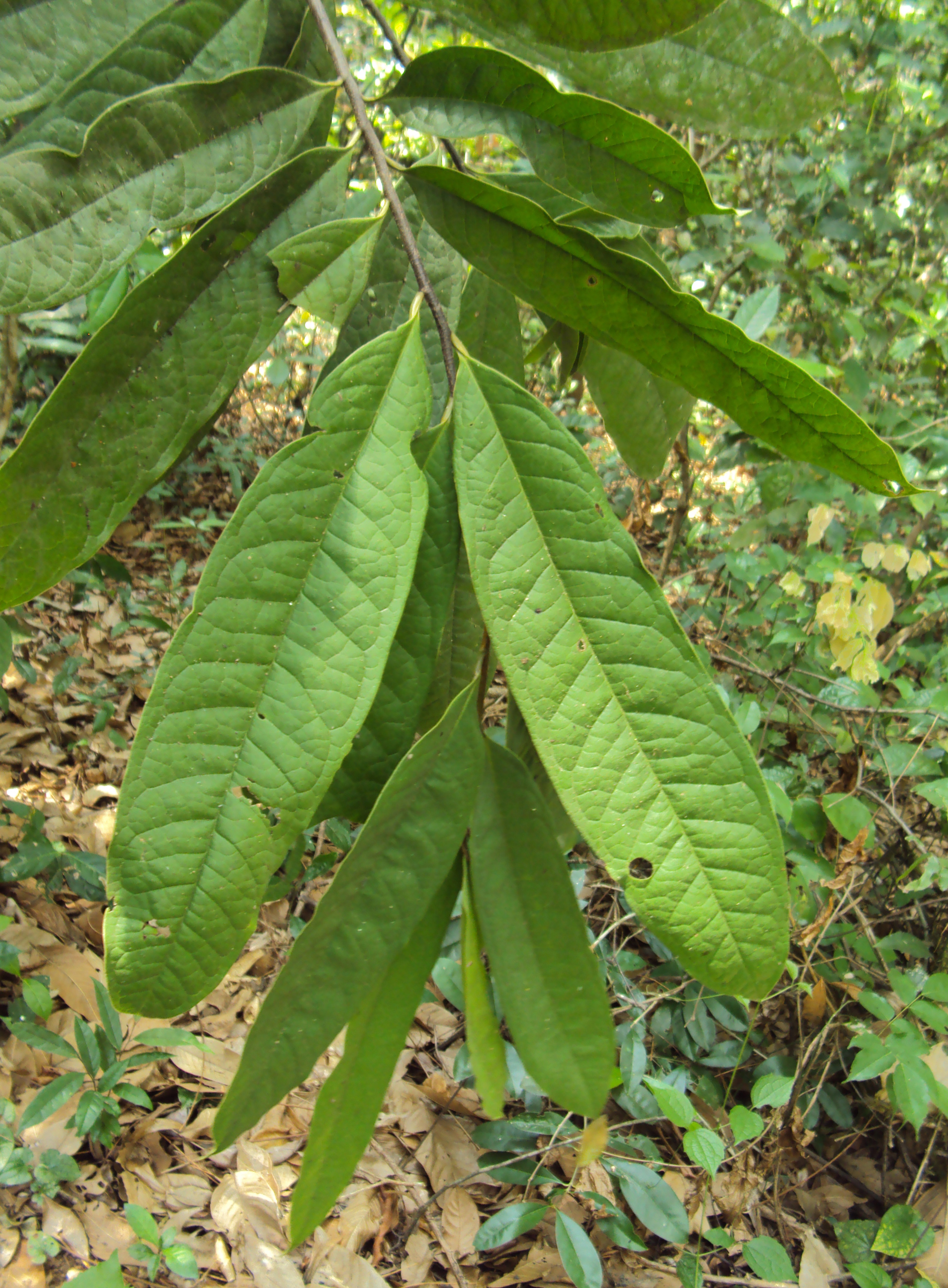
- Goniothalamus wynaadensis

Scientific classification
- Kingdom: Plantae
- Clade: Embryophytes
- Clade: Tracheophytes
- Clade: Spermatophytes
- Clade: Angiosperms
- Clade: Magnoliids
- Order: Magnoliales
- Family: Annonaceae
- Subfamily: Annonoideae
- Genus: Goniothalamus (Blume) Hook. f. & Thomson

Synonyms
- Atrategia Bedd. ex Hook.f.; Atrutegia Bedd.; Beccariodendron Warb.; Richella A.Gray

= Goniothalamus =

Genus of flowering plants

Goniothalamus is one of the largest palaeotropical genera of plant in family Annonaceae.

== Species list ==
It contains the following species (divided according to Floristic Region):

Fijian Region (Fiji and New Hebrides)

- Goniothalamus monospermus (A.Gray) R.M.K.Saunders

Indian Region (India and Sri Lanka)

- Goniothalamus gardneri Hook.f. & Thomson
- Goniothalamus hookeri Thwaites
- Goniothalamus rhynchantherus Dunn
- Goniothalamus salicina Hook.f. & Thomson
- Goniothalamus simonsii Hook.f. & Thomson
- Goniothalamus thwaitesii Hook.f. & Thomson
- Goniothalamus wynaadensis Bedd.
- Goniothalamus meeboldii Craib

Indochinese Region (South China extending into North Vietnam, Laos, Thailand and Myanmar)

- Goniothalamus aurantiacus R.M.K. Saunders & Chalermglin
- Goniothalamus chinensis, Merr. & Chun
- Goniothalamus calvicarpus Craib
- Goniothalamus chartaceus H.L.Li
- Goniothalamus cheliensis H.H.Hu
- Goniothalamus elegans Ast
- Goniothalamus expansus Craib
- Goniothalamus griffithii Hook.f. & Thomson
- Goniothalamus laoticus (Finep & Gagnep.) Bân
- Goniothalamus macrocalyx Bân
- Goniothalamus repevensis Pierre ex Finet & Gagnep.
- Goniothalamus rongklanus R.M.K. Saunders & Chalermglin
- Goniothalamus saigonensis Pierre ex Finet & Gagnep.
- Goniothalamus sawtehii C.E.C.Fisch.
- Goniothalamus tamirensis Pierre ex Finet & Gagnep.
- Goniothalamus tavoyensis Chatterjee
- Goniothalamus saccopetaloides Y.H.Tan & Bin Yang

Malesian Region (Malaysia, Borneo, New Guinea, Sumatra, Philippines)

- Goniothalamus acehensis R. M. K. Saunders
- Goniothalamus alatus R. M. K. Saunders
- Goniothalamus amuyon (Blanco) Merr.
- Goniothalamus andersonii J.Sinclair
- Goniothalamus calycinus J. Sinclair
- Goniothalamus costulatus Miq.
- Goniothalamus curtisii King
- Goniothalamus dewildei R. M. K. Saunders
- Goniothalamus expansus Craib
  - synonym: Goniothalamus subevenius King
- Goniothalamus flavus Hook.f. & Thomson
- Goniothalamus giganteus (Wall. ex) Hook.f. & Thomson
- Goniothalamus grandiflorus (Warb.) Boerl.
- Goniothalamus holttumii J. Sinclair
- Goniothalamus latestigma C.E.C.Fisch.
- Goniothalamus loerzingii R. M. K. Saunders
- Goniothalamus longistaminus R. M. K. Saunders
- Goniothalamus macrophyllus (Blume) Hook.f. & Thomson
- Goniothalamus maewongensis R.M.K. Saunders & Chalermglin
- Goniothalamus majestatis Keßler
- Goniothalamus malayanus Hook.f. & Thomson
- Goniothalamus miquelianus R. M. K. Saunders
- Goniothalamus montanus J. Sinclair
- Goniothalamus nitidus Merr.
- Goniothalamus parallelivenius Ridl.
- Goniothalamus puncticulifolius Merr.
- Goniothalamus ridleyi King
- Goniothalamus rotundisepalus M.R. Hend.
- Goniothalamus scortechinii King
- Goniothalamus tapis Miq.
- Goniothalamus tavogensis Chatterjee
- Goniothalamus tenuifolius King
- Goniothalamus tomentosus R.M.K. Saunders
- Goniothalamus tortilipetalus M.R. Hend.
- Goniothalamus undulatus Ridl.
- Goniothalamus uvarioides King
- Goniothalamus velutinus King
- Goniothalamus wrayi Airy Shaw

Neocaledonian Region (New Caledonia)

- Goniothalamus dumontetii R.M.K. Saunders & J. Munzinger
- Goniothalamus hmoope Munzinger & D.M. Johnson
- Goniothalamus obtusatus (Baill.) R.M.K.Saunders
