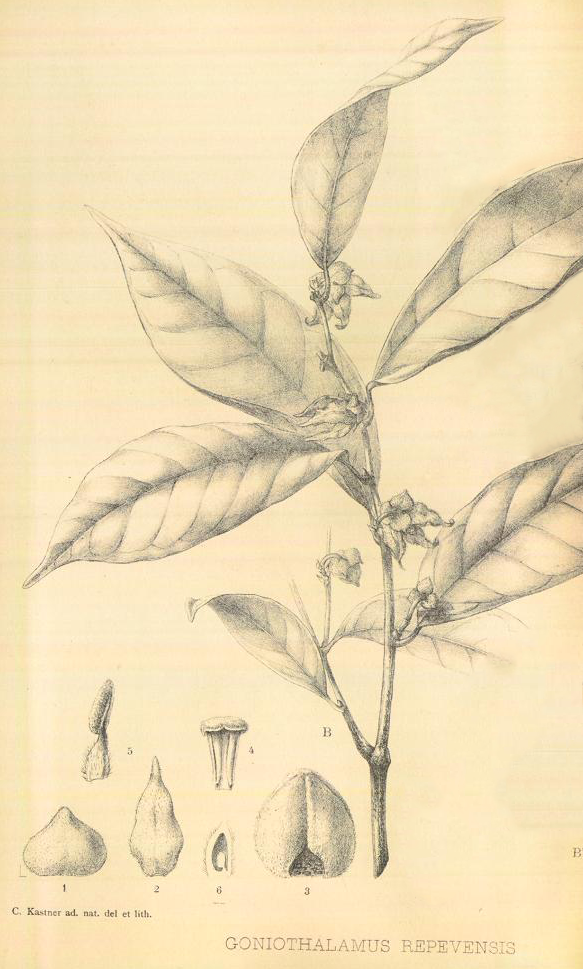
- Botanical illustration of Goniothalamus repevensis

Scientific classification
- Kingdom: Plantae
- Clade: Tracheophytes
- Clade: Angiosperms
- Clade: Magnoliids
- Order: Magnoliales
- Family: Annonaceae
- Genus: Goniothalamus
- Species: G. repevensis

Binomial name
- Goniothalamus repevensis Pierre ex Finet & Gagnep.

= Goniothalamus repevensis =

Species of plant in the soursop family

Goniothalamus repevensis is a species of plant in the family Annonaceae. It is native to Cambodia, Laos and Thailand. Achille Eugène Finet and François Gagnepain, the French botanists who first formally described the species, named it after Mt. Knang-Repeuh in Cambodia where Jean Baptiste Louis Pierre collected the lectotype specimen they examined.

== Description ==
It is a bush or small tree reaching 6–7 meters (20–23 ft) in height. Its black, slender branches have fine dark-red hairs when young, but later become hairless. Its oblong leaves are 3.5 by 13 centimeters (1.4 by 5.1 in) with tips that come to a long tapering point and bases that taper to their connection to their petioles. Both surfaces of the leaves are hairless and their margins are wavy. Its leaves have thin secondary veins that arch and connect with one another near the leaf margins. Its hairless, wrinkled petioles are 6 millimeters long. Its solitary (rarely in pairs) are axillary and have a distinctive pink to dark-red color. The flowers are born on pedicels that are 3–5 millimeters long. Its flowers have 3 sepals that are 2.5 to 3.5 millimeters long. Its 6 petals are arranged in two rows of 3. The exterior petals are lance-shaped. The upper parts of the interior petals are fused along their margins forming a semi-spherical arch. It has numerous stamen with anthers that dehisce longitudinally and connective tissue extends above the anther lobes to form a thick flat top. Its ovaries are covered in coarse hairs. Its styles are attached to the side of the stigma forming a ventral suture. Its large, convex, elliptical stigmas with prominent papillae are characteristic for the species. Its fruit are 1–2.6 centimeters long.

=== Reproductive biology ===
The pollen of G. repevensis is shed as permanent tetrads.

== Habitat and distribution ==
It has been observed growing in dry evergreen forests at elevations of 600–900 meters (2,000–3,000 ft).

== Uses ==
In Cambodia it is commonly called Vor Krovan and is reported to be used in cosmetics.
