= Goniothalamus macrocalyx =

Conservation status
- Vulnerable (IUCN 2.3)

Scientific classification
- Kingdom: Plantae
- Clade: Embryophytes
- Clade: Tracheophytes
- Clade: Spermatophytes
- Clade: Angiosperms
- Clade: Magnoliids
- Order: Magnoliales
- Family: Annonaceae
- Genus: Goniothalamus
- Species: G. macrocalyx

Binomial name
- Goniothalamus macrocalyx Bân

Species of flowering plant

Goniothalamus macrocalyx is a species of flowering plant in the Annonaceae family. It is a shrub or tree endemic to Vietnam.
