= G. gardneri =

G. gardneri may refer to:

- Goniothalamus gardneri, a plant species endemic to Sri Lanka
- Guarea gardneri, a plant species in the genus Guarea

== See also ==
- Gardneri
