= Goniothalamus tamirensis =

Scientific classification
- Kingdom: Plantae
- Clade: Tracheophytes
- Clade: Angiosperms
- Clade: Magnoliids
- Order: Magnoliales
- Family: Annonaceae
- Genus: Goniothalamus
- Species: G. tamirensis

Binomial name
- Goniothalamus tamirensis Pierre ex Finet & Gagnep.

Synonyms
- Goniothalamus marcanii Craib

Species of plant in the soursop family

Goniothalamus tamirensis is a species of plant in the family Annonaceae. It is native to Cambodia, Laos, Peninsular Malaysia, Thailand and Vietnam. The French botanists J.B. Louis Pierre and François Gagnepain, who first formally described the species, named it after the region in Cambodia it was collected from, which they record as "monts Tamir".

== Description ==
It is a small tree reaching 3–4 meters (9.8–13 ft) in height. Its young branches have dense red, velvety hairs. Older branches are black. Its densely hairy petioles are 7–8 millimeters long and have a channel. Its elliptical leaves are 12–17 by 3.7–4.7 centimeters (4.7–6.7 by 1.5–1.9 in) with tips that taper to a point and bases that taper to their petioles. The upper surfaces of the leaves are hairless, the undersides have red wooly hairs. Its flowers are solitary or in pairs and are born on rudimentary, 5-millimeter-long peduncles that occur in axillary positions. Its 3 triangular sepals are fused at the base. The sepals are hairless inside and have rust-colored hairs on their outer surface. Its flowers have 6 petals in two rows of three. The fleshy, lance-shaped outer petals come to a gentle tapering point and are covered in red hairs except for a concave portion of the inner surface at the base. The rhomboidal inner petals come to a shallow point and are also covered in hairs except a patch on the top of the inner surface. Its flowers have numerous stamen with anthers that dehisce longitudinally. The connective tissue between the lobes of the anthers extends upward and outward to form a fleshy head. Its fruit have multiple hairless carpels with, wedge-shaped styles, 1–2 ovules each, and outwardly glandular tips that are recurved and have a ventral suture. Its oval, hairless fruit are up to 3 centimeters long.

=== Reproductive biology ===
The pollen of G. tamirensis is shed as permanent tetrads.

== Habitat and distribution ==
It has been observed growing in dry evergreen forests at elevations of 10–500 meters (33–1,600 ft).

== Uses ==
Bioactive molecules extracted from its leaves have been reported to have mitogenic activity in tests with cultured mouse osteoblasts.
