= Goniothalamus simonsii =

Conservation status
- Endangered (IUCN 2.3)

Scientific classification
- Kingdom: Plantae
- Clade: Tracheophytes
- Clade: Angiosperms
- Clade: Magnoliids
- Order: Magnoliales
- Family: Annonaceae
- Genus: Goniothalamus
- Species: G. simonsii

Binomial name
- Goniothalamus simonsii Hook.f. & Thomson

Species of flowering plant

Goniothalamus simonsii is a species of flowering plant in the Annonaceae family. It is a shrub or tree endemic to Meghalaya in northeastern India.
