= Goniothalamus majestatis =

Conservation status
- Endangered (IUCN 3.1)

Scientific classification
- Kingdom: Plantae
- Clade: Embryophytes
- Clade: Tracheophytes
- Clade: Spermatophytes
- Clade: Angiosperms
- Clade: Magnoliids
- Order: Magnoliales
- Family: Annonaceae
- Genus: Goniothalamus
- Species: G. majestatis

Binomial name
- Goniothalamus majestatis P.Kessler

Species of flowering plant

Goniothalamus majestatis is a species of flowering plant in the Annonaceae family. It is a shrub or tree endemic to Sulawesi in Indonesia.
