= Goniothalamus elegans =

Scientific classification
- Kingdom: Plantae
- Clade: Tracheophytes
- Clade: Angiosperms
- Clade: Magnoliids
- Order: Magnoliales
- Family: Annonaceae
- Genus: Goniothalamus
- Species: G. elegans

Binomial name
- Goniothalamus elegans Ast

Species of plant

Goniothalamus elegans is a species of plant in the family Annonaceae. It is native to Thailand and Vietnam. Suzanne Jovet-Ast, the French botanist who first formally described the species, named it after its elegant (elegans in Latin) thin, flexible leaves.

== Description ==
It is a tree reaching 2 meters in height. Its branches are black or gray. Its petioles are 5 millimeters long with a channel, and either hairless or with fine yellows hairs. Its long, narrow leaves are 7–10.5 by 1.2-1.8 centimeters and come to a tapering point. The leaves have sparse fine hairs on their upper surface and are smooth on their lower surface. The leaves have 10-12 pairs of secondary veins emanating from the midrib. Its solitary flowers are in axillary positions on 3-4 millimeter long pedicels. Its 3 oval sepals have blunt tips and their outer surfaces are covered in short red hairs while their inner surfaces are hairless. Its flowers have 6 petals in two rows of 3. Its outer, oblong petals are 12 millimeters long. Its inner petals are narrower and shorter and united at their top. The flowers have numerous wedge-shaped stamen about 1.5 millimeters long. Its gynoecium have multiple hairless carpels with oval ovaries and slightly narrower styles topped by wider stigma that together are longer than the ovaries.

=== Reproductive biology ===
The pollen of G. elegans is shed as permanent tetrads.

=== Uses ===
Bioactive molecules extracted from its bark have been reported to be cytotoxic in tests with cultured human cancer cells, and to have antiplasmodial activity.

=== Distribution and habitat ===
It has been observed growing in deciduous forests at elevations of 300 to 600 meters.
