= Goniothalamus rongklanus =

Conservation status
- Least Concern (IUCN 3.1)

Scientific classification
- Kingdom: Plantae
- Clade: Embryophytes
- Clade: Tracheophytes
- Clade: Spermatophytes
- Clade: Angiosperms
- Clade: Magnoliids
- Order: Magnoliales
- Family: Annonaceae
- Genus: Goniothalamus
- Species: G. rongklanus

Binomial name
- Goniothalamus rongklanus R.M.K.Saunders & Chalermglin

Species of plant

Goniothalamus rongklanus is a species of flowering plant in the family Annonaceae. It is a tree endemic to Thailand. Richard Saunders and Piya Chalermglin first formally described the species and named it after Phu Hin Rong Kla National Park in Thailand.

== Description ==
It is a tree reaching 8 meters in height. Its papery, elliptical to oblong leaves are 17–25 by 5–7.5 centimeters, have tapering tips and pointed bases. The lower surfaces of the leaves have sparse hairs and their upper surfaces are matt to glossy and mostly hairless. The leaves have 13–16 pairs of secondary veins emanating from their midribs. Its petioles are 8-18 by 2-2.4 millimeters and mostly hairless. Its solitary flowers are born on pedicels that are 13–16 by 2.5 millimeters. The pedicels are in axillary positions, have sparse hairs, and have about 5 bracts. Its broad, oval sepals are green with red highlights and 6 by 9–10 millimeters. The margins of the sepals are fused at their base, their lower surfaces have sparse hairs, and their upper surfaces are hairless. Its flowers have 6 petals arranged in two rows of 3. Its oval outer petals are 2.9 by 2.2 centimeters and chartreuse with red highlights at base. The outer surfaces of the outer petals are mostly hairless and their inner surfaces are hairless. Its light gray inner petals are 1.6–1.7 by 1.1-1.2 centimeters. The outer surfaces of the inner petals have sparse hairs and their inner surfaces are hairy. Its flowers have about 180 stamen that are 2.4–2.5 by 0.6–0.7 millimeters. Its flowers have about 18 carpels with hairless ovaries that are 2.4–2.8 by 0.6–0.8 millimeters and hairless warty stigma. The stigma and styles together are 2.6–2.8 millimeters long. The floral calyx remains attached to the fruit. The fruit are born on sparsely hairy pedicels that are 16–22 by 3.5–4.5 millimeters. The fruit are attached to the pedicels by 3–8 by 3–5.5 millimeter stipes. The smooth, hairless, glossy to matt elliptical fruit are 1.7–5.4 by 1.5–2.4 centimeters. The fruit are green with purple highlights. The base of the fruit is tapering to wedge-shaped, and the tips are rounded to tapering. The fruit have 1–6 smooth to slightly wrinkled, flattened, elliptical seeds that are 1.5–2.2 by 1.3–1.7 centimeters. The seeds are hairy and orange to brown.

=== Reproductive biology ===
The pollen of G. rongklanus is shed as permanent tetrads.

== Habitat and distribution ==
It has been observed growing in mountain forests at an elevation of 900–1200 meters.
