= Goniothalamus puncticulifolius =

Scientific classification
- Kingdom: Plantae
- Clade: Tracheophytes
- Clade: Angiosperms
- Clade: Magnoliids
- Order: Magnoliales
- Family: Annonaceae
- Genus: Goniothalamus
- Species: G. puncticulifolius

Binomial name
- Goniothalamus puncticulifolius Merr.

Species of plant in the soursop family

Goniothalamus puncticulifolius is a species of plant in the family Annonaceae. It is native to Borneo and The Philippines. Elmer Drew Merrill, the American botanist who first formally described the species, named it after its minutely spotted (punctatus in Latin) leaves (-folius in Latin).

== Description ==
It is a bush or small tree. It has thin branches that are covered in fine, copper-colored hair when they are young. Its petioles are 5 millimeters long. Its hairless, papery, olive-colored leaves are 8–12 cm (3.1–4.7 in) by 2–3 cm (0.8–1.2 in) and come to a point at their tip. They are smooth and shiny on their upper side. The undersides of the leaves are paler and have small reddish dots—the species name is derived from this latter characteristic. The leaves have 10 pairs of secondary veins emanating from their midribs. The secondary veins arch near the leaf margins to join one another. Its flowers are yellow, solitary, axillary and have a weak fragrance. The flowers are born on 1 centimeter long pedicels that are covered in fine copper-colored hairs. The pedicels have 2–3 oval bracts that are 2 millimeters long and come to a shallow point at their tips. The bracts are covered in fine hairs. Its 3 oval sepals are 6 millimeters long and come to a point at their tips. The sepals are covered in fine hairs. Its 6 petals are arranged in two rows of 3. The fleshy, oblong to oval outer petals are 2 centimeters by 7–10 millimeters and are pointed at their tip. They are covered in dense, soft, rust-colored hairs on both surfaces. The fleshy, oblong to oval inner petals are 1.5 centimeters by 9 millimeters. The inner petals touch one another, forming a cone, but are not fused and are covered in fine hairs. Its stamen are 2 millimeters long. Its flowers have about 12 oblong to oval ovaries that are 2 millimeters long and covered in appressed fine hairs. Its hairless styles are 4 millimeters long.

=== Reproductive biology ===
The pollen of G. puncticulifolius is shed as permanent tetrads.

== Habitat and distribution ==
It has been observed growing in dry forests at low elevations.
