= Goniothalamus hookeri =

Conservation status
- Vulnerable (IUCN 3.1)

Scientific classification
- Kingdom: Plantae
- Clade: Embryophytes
- Clade: Tracheophytes
- Clade: Spermatophytes
- Clade: Angiosperms
- Clade: Magnoliids
- Order: Magnoliales
- Family: Annonaceae
- Genus: Goniothalamus
- Species: G. hookeri

Binomial name
- Goniothalamus hookeri Thwaites

Species of flowering plant

Goniothalamus hookeri is a species of flowering plant in the Annonaceae family. It is a shrub or tree endemic to Sri Lanka.
