= Goniothalamus rotundisepalus =

Scientific classification
- Kingdom: Plantae
- Clade: Tracheophytes
- Clade: Angiosperms
- Clade: Magnoliids
- Order: Magnoliales
- Family: Annonaceae
- Genus: Goniothalamus
- Species: G. rotundisepalus

Binomial name
- Goniothalamus rotundisepalus M.R.Hend.

Species of plant

Goniothalamus rotundisepalus is a species of plant in the family Annonaceae. It is native to Peninsular Malaysia and Thailand. Murray Ross Henderson, the Scottish botanist who first formally described the species, named it after its sepals which are rounded like the arc of a circle (rotundatus in Latin).

== Description ==
It is a bush reaching 1 to 2 meters in height. Its dark, young branches initially have fine red hairs, but become hairless when mature. Its papery, hairless, oblong to elliptical leaves are 10.5-23.5 by 3.5-8.5 centimeters with tips that taper to a point. Its leaves have 7-9 pairs of secondary veins that emanate from their midribs. Smaller veins create a fine network that gives the leaves a granular texture. Its solitary, pale green flowers are in supra-axillary positions. Its pedicels are 4-5 millimeters long and covered in sparse red hairs. Its sepals are rounded like the arc of a circle. The outer surface of the sepals are hairless or have fine sparse hairs and their inner surface is hairless. Its 6 leathery petals are arranged in two rows of 3. The lance-shaped outer petals are 2.5 by 1 centimeter and have sparse red hairs. The oval inner petals are 4-9 by 2.5-5.5 millimeters and have sparse red hairs on their outer surface and dense, coarse, brown hairs inside. Its flowers have 24-80 stamen. Its carpels have linear oblong ovaries covered in red hairs, thick style and two thick stigma surfaces. Its fruit are born on pedicels that are 4-8 millimeters long. The fruit are connect to the pedicels by 2-3 millimeter stipes.

=== Reproductive biology ===
The pollen of G. rotundisepalus is shed as permanent tetrads.

== Habitat and distribution ==
It has been observed growing in lowland forests at elevations of 60 to 370 meters.
