= Goniothalamus tortilipetalus =

Conservation status
- Least Concern (IUCN 3.1)

Scientific classification
- Kingdom: Plantae
- Clade: Embryophytes
- Clade: Tracheophytes
- Clade: Spermatophytes
- Clade: Angiosperms
- Clade: Magnoliids
- Order: Magnoliales
- Family: Annonaceae
- Genus: Goniothalamus
- Species: G. tortilipetalus

Binomial name
- Goniothalamus tortilipetalus M.R.Hend.

Species of plant in the soursop family

Goniothalamus tortilipetalus is a species of plant in the family Annonaceae. It is native to Peninsular Malaysia and Thailand. Murray Ross Henderson, the Scottish botanist who first formally described the species, named it after its twisted (tortilis in Latin) petals.

== Description ==
It is a tree reaching 6 meters (20 ft) in height. Its small, hairless, grey to black branches have longitudinal wrinkles. Its black, wrinkled petioles are 0.7–1.6 centimeters with a channel on their upper surfaces. It leathery, hairless, oblong to oval leaves are 20–39 by 6.5–11.5 centimeters (7.9–15.4 by 2.6–4.5 in) with wedge-shaped bases and abruptly tapering tips. The leaves are covered with minutes dots; their upper surface is shiny and pale brown to olive-colored while the undersides are dull and pale brown. Its leaves have 14–22 secondary veins that arch and connect with one another about 6 millimeters from leaf edge. The leaves have prominent tertiary veins. Its solitary (sometimes in pairs) flowers are born on hairless, wrinkled pedicels that are 2–3.7 centimeters long. The pedicels emerge from warty tubercles on the main trunk. Its leathery to membranous, triangular to oval sepals are 1.9–3.1 by 1.5–2.6 centimeters with fused bases and short blunt-pointed tips. The sepals are hairless except their tips which have minute red hairs. The outside of the sepals are shiny while the insides are dull and covered in minute dots. Its flowers have 6 petals in two rows of three. The chartreuse, leathery, lance-shaped, twisted outer petals are 3.5–10 by 1–3.2 centimeters with tips that taper to a blunt point. The outer petals are covered on both surfaces with minute hairs. The outer petals are sometimes fused at their base to the inner petals. The thick, fleshy, oblong to lance-shaped inner petals are 1.2–2 by 0.5–0.8 centimeters. The upper 2/3 of the inner petals are fused at their margins. The inside of the inner petals is covered in velvety hairs. Its flowers have 170-260 hairless stamen that are 4 millimeters long and curve inwards. The connective tissue between the lobes of the anther extends upward for 0.6–0.7 millimeters to form a tapering tip. Its flowers have 50–100 carpels with oblong, flattened ovaries that are 2–2.2 millimeters long and covered in dense, matted, silky, golden hairs. Each ovary has 1–2 ovules. Its flattened styles are 4.5–5 millimeters long and come to a tapering tip that exudes sticky mucilage. Its fruit are on pedicels that are 1.9–3.6 centimeters (0.75–1.42 in) long. The elliptical fruit are 0.9-1.2 centimeters wide. The hairless seeds are 1.2–1.7 by 0.8–1.1 centimeters.

=== Reproductive biology ===
The pollen of G. tortilipetalus is shed as permanent tetrads.

== Habitat and distribution ==
It has been observed growing in lowland forests with soil rich in calcium carbonate at elevations of 60 to 300 meters (200 to 980 ft).

== Uses ==
Bioactive molecules extracted from its bark have been reported to have vasoconstrictive activity in tests with rat arteries.
