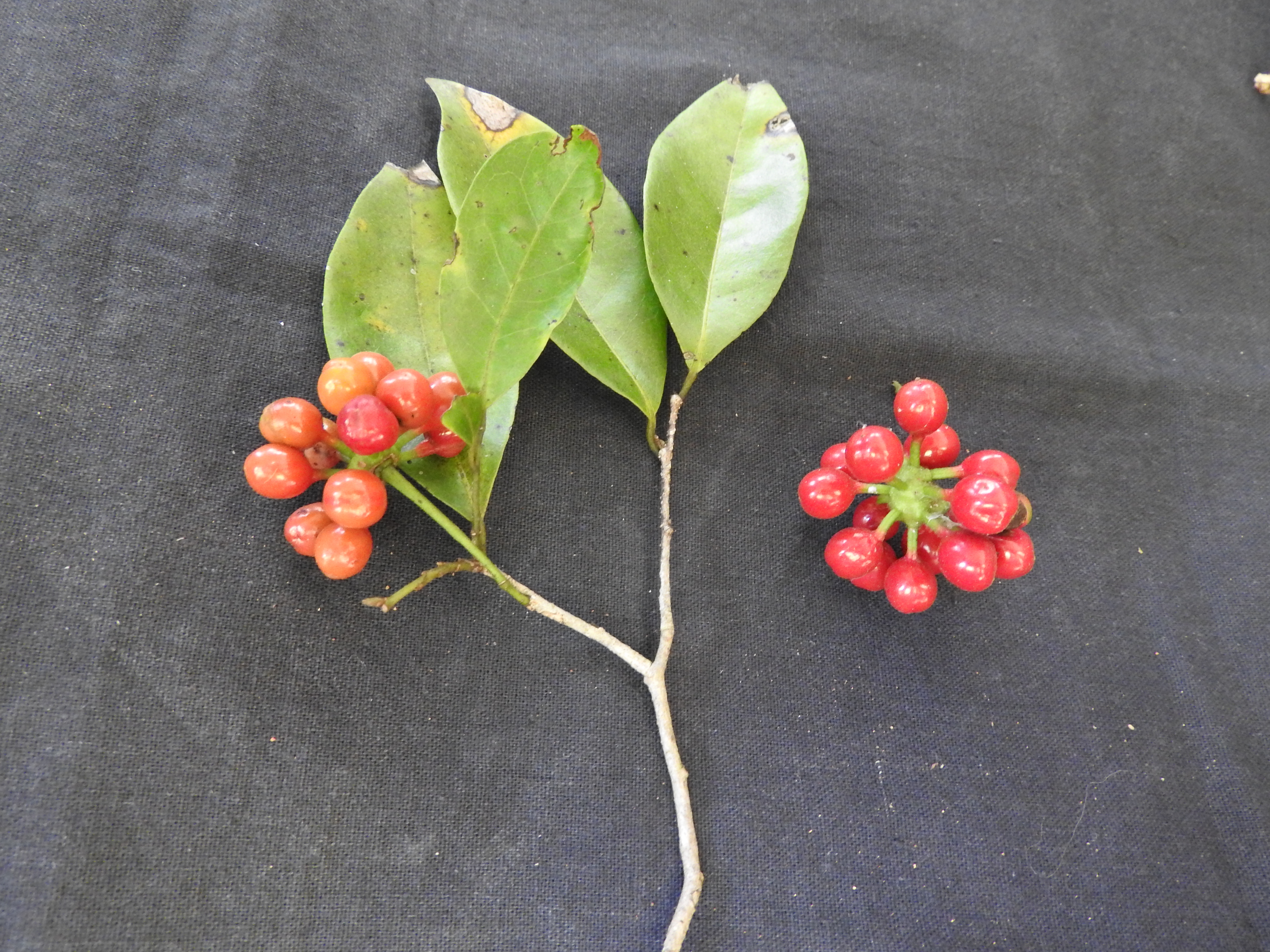

Conservation status
- Vulnerable (IUCN 3.1)

Scientific classification
- Kingdom: Plantae
- Clade: Embryophytes
- Clade: Tracheophytes
- Clade: Spermatophytes
- Clade: Angiosperms
- Clade: Magnoliids
- Order: Magnoliales
- Family: Annonaceae
- Genus: Goniothalamus
- Species: G. thwaitesii

Binomial name
- Goniothalamus thwaitesii Hook.f. & Thomson

= Goniothalamus thwaitesii =

Species of flowering plant

Goniothalamus thwaitesii is a species of small tree in the Annonaceae family. It is endemic to the Western Ghats of India and Sri Lanka.

== Flowers ==
Borne solitarily and axillary.

== Fruits ==
Sessile, one-seeded clustered berry.

== Ecology ==
rain forest understory.
