= Goniothalamus cheliensis =

Conservation status
- Endangered (IUCN 3.1)

Scientific classification
- Kingdom: Plantae
- Clade: Tracheophytes
- Clade: Angiosperms
- Clade: Magnoliids
- Order: Magnoliales
- Family: Annonaceae
- Genus: Goniothalamus
- Species: G. cheliensis

Binomial name
- Goniothalamus cheliensis Hu

Species of flowering plant

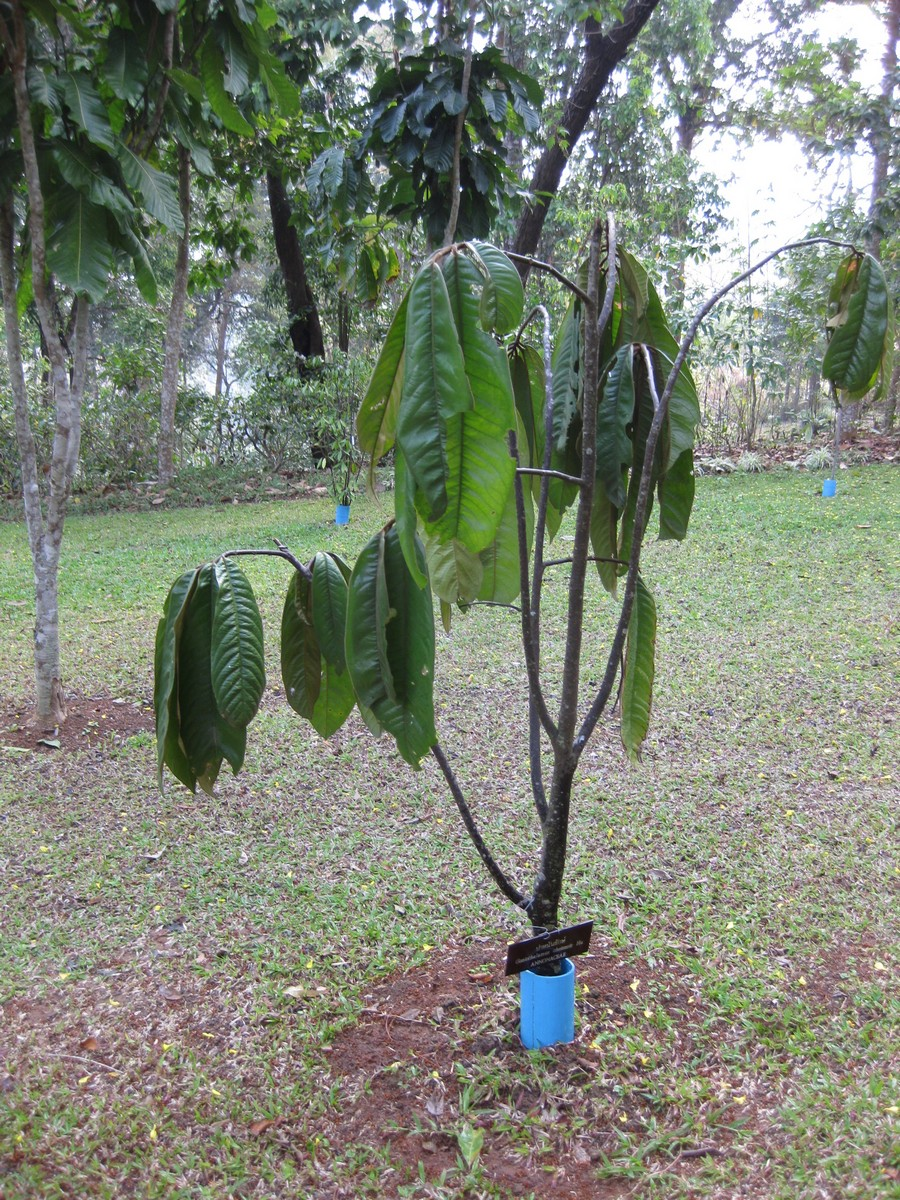

Goniothalamus cheliensis is a species of flowering plant in the Annonaceae family. It is native to southern Yunnan Province of south-central China, and Laos, Myanmar, and Thailand in northern Indochina. Bioactive molecules isolated from its roots have been reported to have cytotoxic activity in tests with cultured human cancer cells.

== Description ==
It has large leaves, 50-76 by 13-22 centimeters, that are densely hairy on their underside. It also has large flowers. Its sepals are 30-40 by 28-30 millimeters and its outer petals are 60-80 by 30-40 millimeters.

=== Reproductive biology ===
The pollen of G. cheliensis is shed as permanent tetrads.
