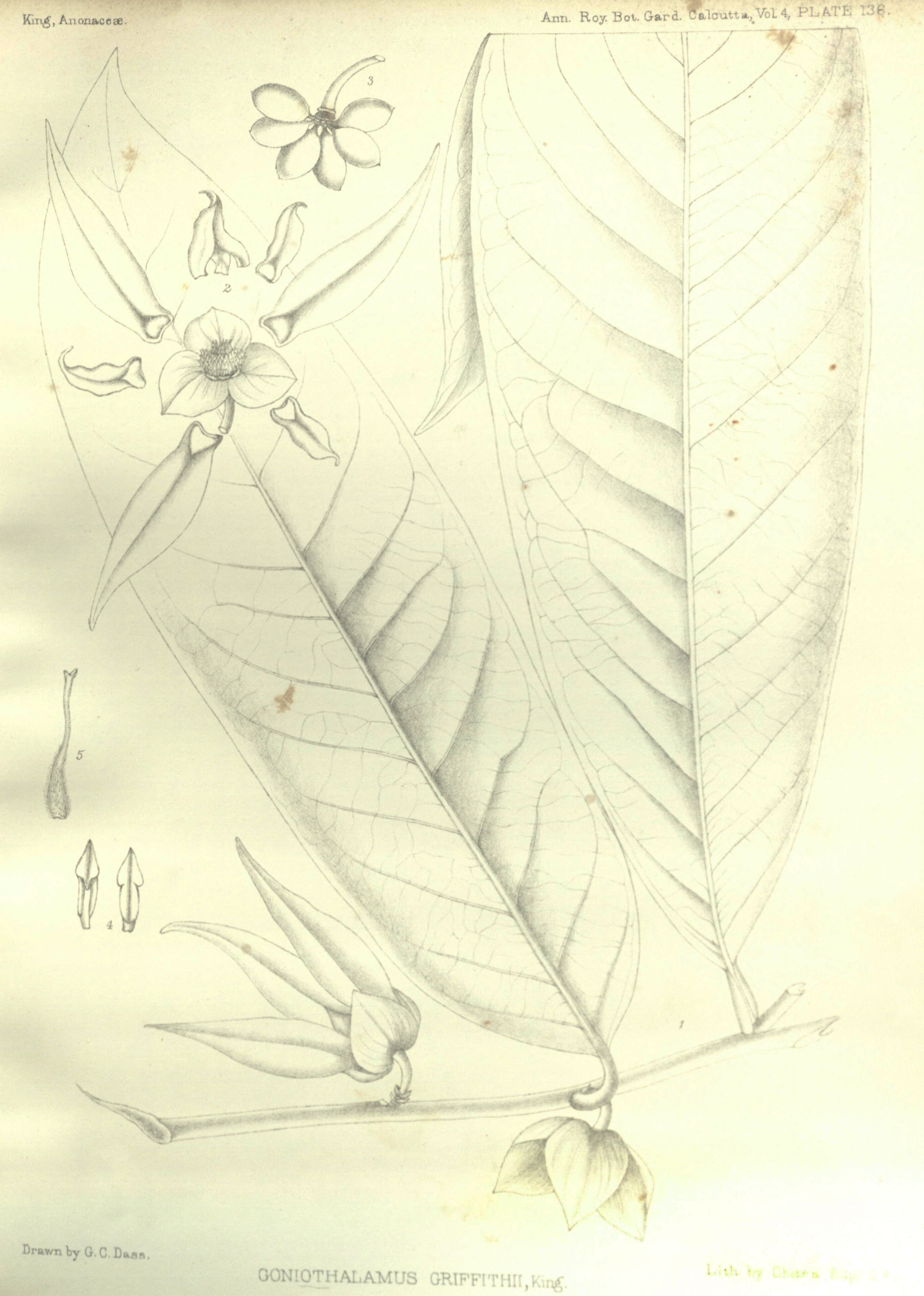
- Botanical illustration of Goniothalamus griffithii.

Conservation status
- Endangered (IUCN 3.1)

Scientific classification
- Kingdom: Plantae
- Clade: Embryophytes
- Clade: Tracheophytes
- Clade: Spermatophytes
- Clade: Angiosperms
- Clade: Magnoliids
- Order: Magnoliales
- Family: Annonaceae
- Genus: Goniothalamus
- Species: G. griffithii

Binomial name
- Goniothalamus griffithii Hook.f. & Thomson

= Goniothalamus griffithii =

Species of plant

Goniothalamus griffithii is a species of flowering plant in the family Annonaceae. It is a shrub or tree native to the Andaman Islands, southern Myanmar, and Thailand. Joseph Dalton Hooker and Thomas Thomson the British botanists who first formally described the species, named it in honor of William Griffith, another British botanist who collected the specimen they examined.

== Description ==
Its rough branches are dark gray. It has oblong, hairless, leathery leaves are 16.2 - 21.6 by 6.75 - 8.1 centimeters. The leaves are covered in minute translucent impressions. The undersides of the leaves are paler than the upper surfaces. Its petioles are 1.3 centimeters long. Its bent peduncles are the same length as its petioles and are scaly at their base. Its 1.8 centimeter long, rounded sepals are united at their base, covered in minute, fine hairs. Its flowers have 6 petals in two rows of 3. Its smooth, linear-oblong outer petals are thick and leathery and tapered at their base. The upper 1.3 centimeters of its inner petals are joined at their margins. Its stamen are linear-oblong with a fleshy tip that extends above the anthers. Its gynoecium have ovaries that are covered in short rigid hairs and styles that have fluted ends.

== Reproductive biology ==
Pollen is shed as permanent tetrads.

== Uses ==
Bioactive molecules isolated from its roots have been reported to have cytotoxic activity in tests with cultured human cancer cells.
