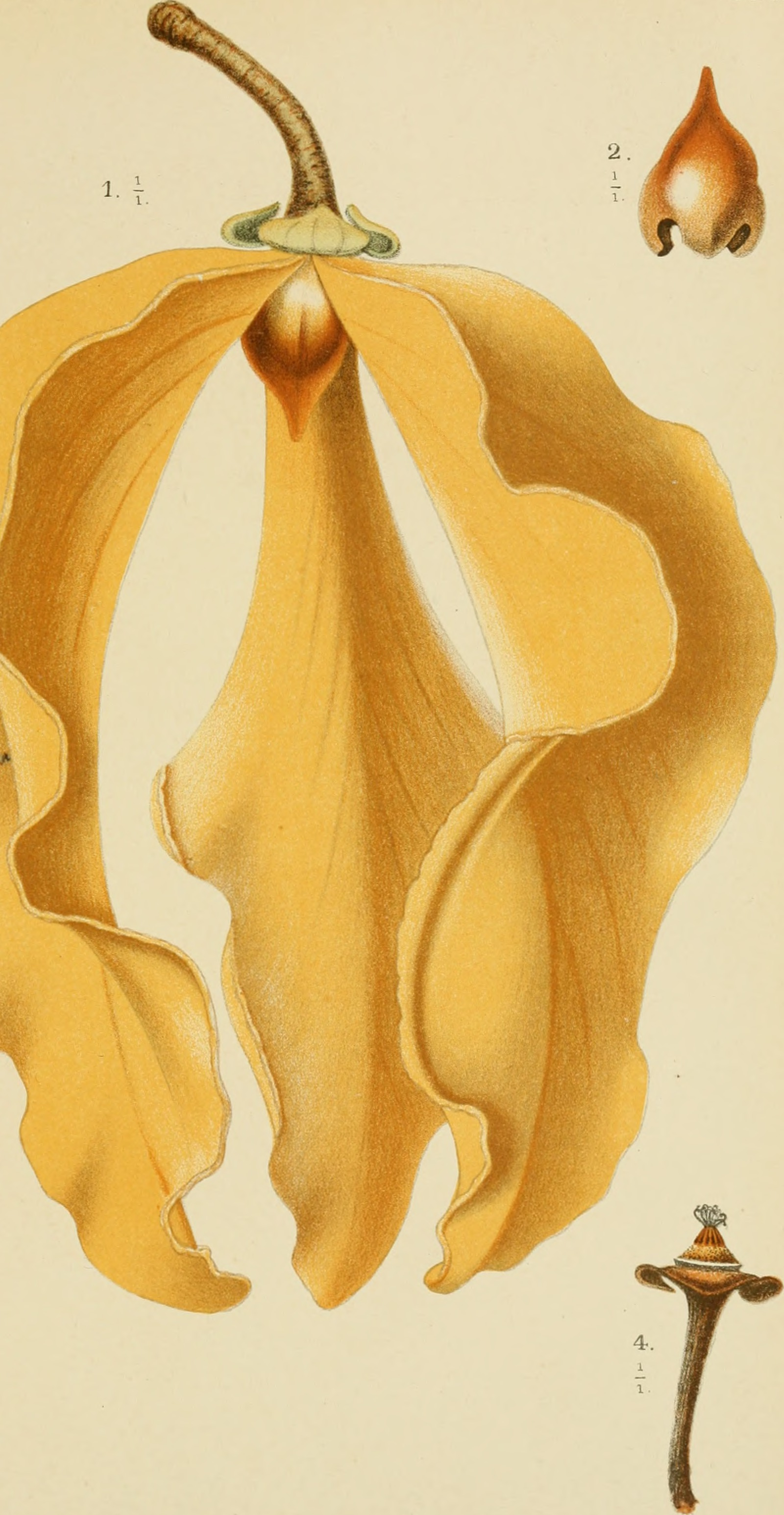
- Color illustration of Goniothalamus giganteus.

Conservation status
- Least Concern (IUCN 3.1)

Scientific classification
- Kingdom: Plantae
- Clade: Embryophytes
- Clade: Tracheophytes
- Clade: Spermatophytes
- Clade: Angiosperms
- Clade: Magnoliids
- Order: Magnoliales
- Family: Annonaceae
- Genus: Goniothalamus
- Species: G. giganteus

Binomial name
- Goniothalamus giganteus Hook.f. & Thomson

Synonyms
- Goniothalamus oxycarpus (Miq.) Miq. Guatteria oxycarpa Miq.

= Goniothalamus giganteus =

Species of plant

Goniothalamus giganteus is a species of plant in the family Annonaceae. It is native to Malaya, Myanmar, Sumatra and Thailand. Joseph Dalton Hooker and Thomas Thomson, the British botanists who first formally described the species, named it after its exceptionally large (giganteus in Latin) flowers.

== Description ==
Its young branches are smooth and its older branches have white bark with a wrinkled surface. Its petioles are 8 mm long. Its leathery, stiff leaves are 16.2–27 cm (6.4–10.6 in) by 4.8–8.1 cm (1.9–3.2 in). The upper surfaces of the leaves are shiny and dark green, while the undersides are paler. Its large yellow flowers are on 2.7–4.1 cm (1.1–1.6 in) long peduncles that are in axillary positions. Its 3 broad, oval sepals are 1.8 cm (0.71 in) long and come to a blunt point at their tips. The sepals have woolly hairs on both surfaces. Its flowers have 6 petals in two rows of 3. Its outer petals are 10.8 cm (4.3 in) by 5.4 cm (2.1 in) with a clawed base and wavy margins. Both sides of the outer petals have fine hairs and the base of the inner surface has golden silky hairs. The inner petals have dense silky hairs and are united in the upper 1.8 centimeters of their margins. The flowers' receptacles are flat and hollowed out in the middle. It has numerous stamen. Its ovaries are linear to oblong. Its styles are filiform with slightly club-shaped tips.

=== Reproductive biology ===
Its pollen is shed as permanent tetrads.

== Habitat and distribution ==
It has been observed growing in evergreen forests, swampy lowlands, and hillsides at elevations from sea level to 900 m.

== Uses ==
Bioactive compounds extracted from its bark have been reported to have cytotoxic activity in tests with cultured human cancer cells.
