= Goniothalamus tavoyensis =

Scientific classification
- Kingdom: Plantae
- Clade: Tracheophytes
- Clade: Angiosperms
- Clade: Magnoliids
- Order: Magnoliales
- Family: Annonaceae
- Genus: Goniothalamus
- Species: G. tavoyensis

Binomial name
- Goniothalamus tavoyensis Chatterjee

Species of plant in the soursop family

Goniothalamus tavoyensis is a species of plant in the family Annonaceae. It is native to Myanmar and Thailand. Debabarta Chatterjee, who first formally described the species, named it after a town in Myanmar that at the time was called Tavoy, but has since been renamed Dawei.

== Description ==
It is a small tree. Its wrinkled, hairless, dark brown branches are circular in cross-section and have lenticels. Its petioles are 5–10 millimeters long. Its leathery, elliptical, hairless leaves are 10–25.5 by 3.5–6.5 centimeters (3.9–10.0 by 1.4–2.6 in) with tapering tips and wedge-shaped bases. It leaves have 10–12 pairs secondary veins emanating from their midribs and their smaller veins give the leaves a granular appearance. Its solitary flowers are born on 5 millimeter-long pedicels in axillary to supra-axillary positions. The pedicels have minute lance-shaped bracts. Its 3 hairless, triangular to oval sepals are 4 millimeters long with edges that touch but are not fused. Its flowers have 6 petals in two rows of three. The thick, rust-colored, oval to lance-shaped outer petals are 8 by 4 millimeters with tapering tips. The thick inner petals have edges that are fused at their apex to form a cone. Its flowers have numerous short stamen that lack filaments. The stamen's anthers are 1.5 millimeters long and the connective tissue between the anther lobes extends up to form a 1.5 millimeters-long tapering cap. Its flowers have 7–10 hairless, narrow cylindrical carpels and rounded stigmas. Its hairless, elliptical fruit are 1.4–1.8 by 0.7–1 centimeters and occur in groups of 4–8. The fruit have hard pointed tips, tapering bases with persistent calyx. The fruit are born on 9–15 millimeters-long pedicels. The fruit are attached to the pedicels by 2–3 millimeters-long stipes.

=== Reproductive biology ===
The pollen of G. tavoyensis is shed as permanent tetrads.

== Habitat and distribution ==
It has been observed growing in evergreen forests at elevation of 0 to 1,000 meters (3,300 ft).
