= Goniothalamus expansus =

Scientific classification
- Kingdom: Plantae
- Clade: Tracheophytes
- Clade: Angiosperms
- Clade: Magnoliids
- Order: Magnoliales
- Family: Annonaceae
- Genus: Goniothalamus
- Species: G. expansus

Binomial name
- Goniothalamus expansus Craib

Species of plant

Goniothalamus expansus is a species of plant in the family Annonaceae. It is native to Thailand and Vietnam. William Grant Craib, the British botanist who first formally described the species, named it after its expanded (expansus in Latin) stigmas.

== Description ==
It is a bush reaching 3 meters in height. Its branches are smooth and gray. Its petioles are 7 millimeters long with a channel on their upper surface. Its smooth, papery, elliptical to oblong leaves are 14–20 by 5–8.5 centimeters with tips that taper to a point and wedge-shaped to pointed bases. The leaves are paler on their undersides and have margins that are deflected down toward their undersides. The leaves have 12–14 pairs of secondary veins emanating from their midribs. Its green flowers are on 20–25 millimeters long, smooth pedicels. Its 3 oval sepals are 8 by 4.5 millimeters and come to a point at their tips. The outer surfaces of the sepals are hairless and warty and the inner surface are hairless. Its flowers have 6 petals in two rows of 3. Its outer, lance-shaped petals are 2.7 by 0.5 centimeters and have a fleshy base transitioning into a thinner tapering point at their tips. The outer petals have sparse fine hairs but are otherwise smooth. The oblong to oval, fleshy, inner petals are 9 by 4 millimeters. The inner leaves have fine hairs at their tips and are coherent. stamen are 1.75 millimeters long. Its gynoecium are covered in rust-colored hairs and have 2.25 millimeter long styles, and two-lobed, expanded stigma that are 1.75 millimeters wide. Its flowers remain attached to its smooth, oval fruit. The 16 by 10 millimeter fruit have one 15 by 10 millimeter seed, and are borne on a 5 millimeter long stipe.

=== Reproductive biology ===
Its pollen are shed as permanent tetrads.

=== Habitat and distribution ===
It has been observed growing in evergreen forests at elevations of 100 meters.
