= Goniothalamus nitidus =

Conservation status
- Critically Endangered (IUCN 3.1)

Scientific classification
- Kingdom: Plantae
- Clade: Embryophytes
- Clade: Tracheophytes
- Clade: Spermatophytes
- Clade: Angiosperms
- Clade: Magnoliids
- Order: Magnoliales
- Family: Annonaceae
- Genus: Goniothalamus
- Species: G. nitidus

Binomial name
- Goniothalamus nitidus Merr.

Species of plant

Goniothalamus nitidus is a species of flowering plant in the family Annonaceae. It is a shrub or tree native to northern Borneo. Elmer Drew Merrill, the American botanist who first formally described the species, named it after its shining (nitidus in Latin) leaves.

== Description ==
It is a tree reaching 7 meters in height. Its mature, dark branches are hairless. It's sparsely hairy to hairless petioles are 1 - 1.5 centimeters long. The leaves are olive-green, papery, oblong to elliptical, measuring 22-30 by 6-10 centimeters and shiny on both sides. The leaves come to a shallow, tapering tip and are pointed at their base. The upper surfaces of the leaves are hairless, while the lower surfaces are sparsely hairy to hairless. Each leaf has 17-20 pairs of secondary veins emanating from its midribs. The secondary veins are connected by arching veins 3-7 millimeters from the margin of the leaves. Its dark red flowers grow in clusters, or fascicles, from the trunk or on branches below the leaves. The flowers are on 1.5-2 centimeter-long pedicels that have sparse rust-colored hairs. The pedicels are subtended by oval to oblong bracts that are 2-2.5 millimeters long and covered in dense fine hairs. It's round to oval sepals are 1 by 1 centimeters have rounded or shallow, slightly tapered tips. The sepals are covered in fine hairs and have distinct venation. Its flowers have 6 petals in two rows of three. The narrowly elliptical outer petals are 6-6.5 to 1.5-2 centimeters and sparsely covered in fine hairs on both surfaces. The outer petals have a distinct midrib and finer secondary veins. The inner petals are 2.3 by 1 centimeters and are connected at their margins, forming a cone that is wider at the base and narrower at the top. The inner petals are hairless on their inner surfaces and covered in fine hairs on their outer surfaces. Its flowers have numerous stamen that are 3.5 millimeters long and taper to a sharp point at their tip. Its flowers have numerous pistils with oblong carpels that are 1.5 millimeters long and covered in fine hairs. The carpels have 1-2 ovules. Its hairless styles are 3 millimeters long with thickened tops. Its stigma has two lobes. Its oblong to oval, wrinkled, hairless fruit is 2 centimeters long with rounded tips and pointed bases. The fruit has 1-2 oval seeds that are 1.5 centimeters long.

=== Reproductive biology ===
The pollen of G. nitidus is shed as permanent tetrads.

== Habitat and distribution ==
Goniothalamus nitidus has been observed growing in forests on steep ridges and near streams. It has also been observed in naturally regenerating secondary forests.
