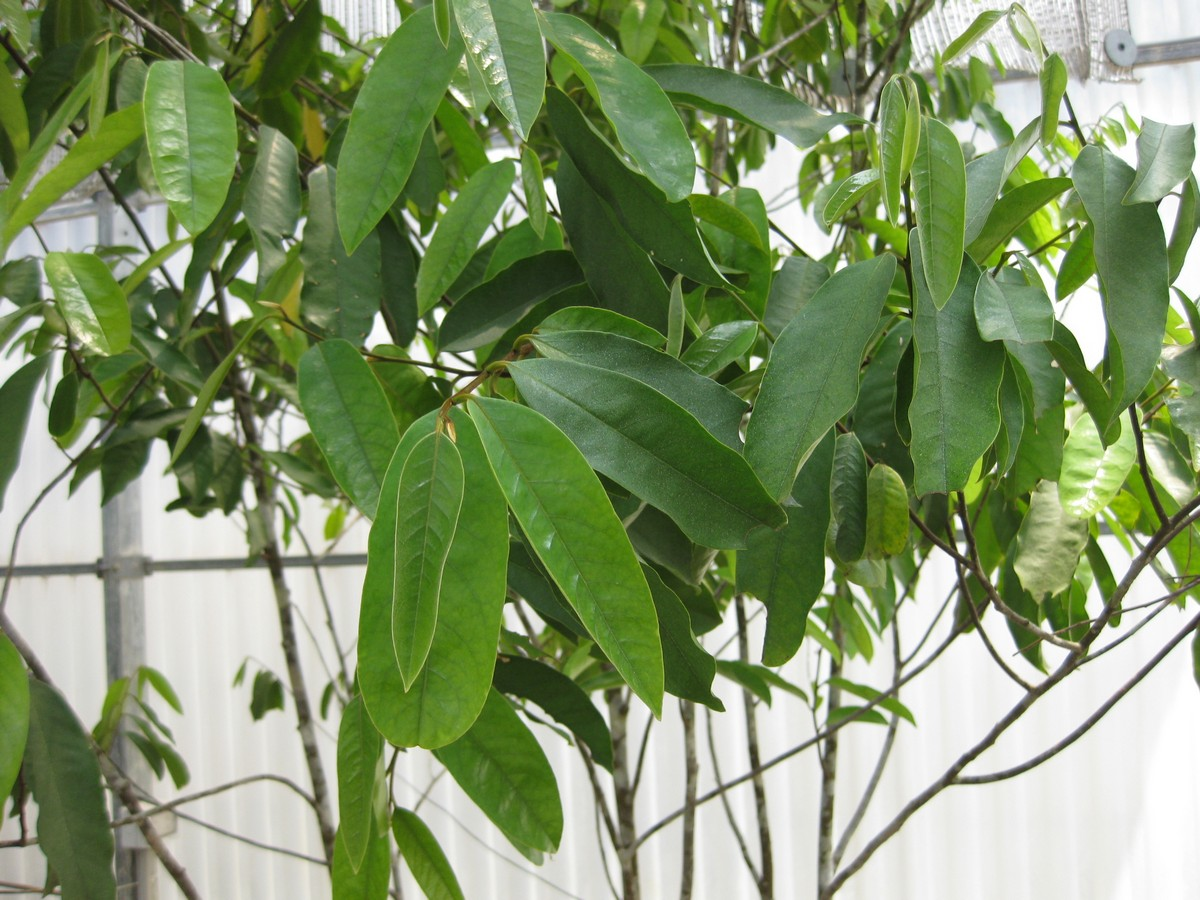

Scientific classification
- Kingdom: Plantae
- Clade: Embryophytes
- Clade: Tracheophytes
- Clade: Angiosperms
- Clade: Magnoliids
- Order: Magnoliales
- Family: Annonaceae
- Genus: Goniothalamus
- Species: G. saccopetaloides

Binomial name
- Goniothalamus saccopetaloides Y.H.Tan & Bin Yang

= Goniothalamus saccopetaloides =

Species of flowering plant

Goniothalamus saccopetaloides is a species of flowering plant from the genus Goniothalamus. It was discovered in Laos in 2020.
