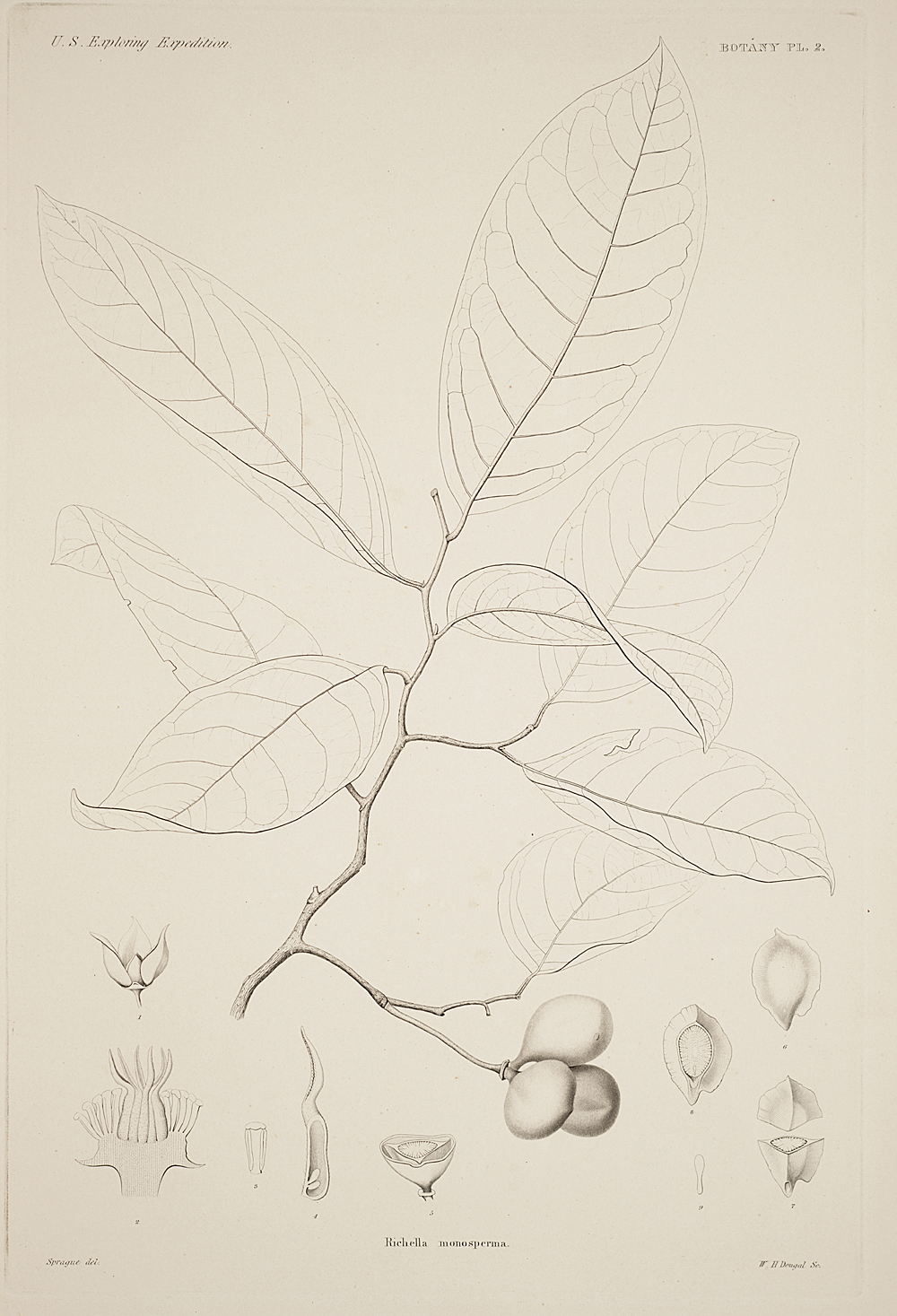
- Botanical illustration of Goniothalamus monospermus (using basionym Richella monosperma) showing leavers, branches, flower parts, fruit and seeds.

Conservation status
- Least Concern (IUCN 3.1)

Scientific classification
- Kingdom: Plantae
- Clade: Embryophytes
- Clade: Tracheophytes
- Clade: Spermatophytes
- Clade: Angiosperms
- Clade: Magnoliids
- Order: Magnoliales
- Family: Annonaceae
- Genus: Goniothalamus
- Species: G. monospermus

Binomial name
- Goniothalamus monospermus (A.Gray) R.M.K.Saunders

Synonyms
- Oxymitra monosperma (A.Gray) A.C.Sm. Richella monosperma A.Gray

= Goniothalamus monospermus =

Species of plant

Goniothalamus monospermus is a species of plant in the family Annonaceae. It is native to Fiji. Asa Gray, the American botanist who first formally described the species using the basionym Richella monosperma, named it after its fruit's solitary seed (Latinized forms of Greek μόνος, mónos and σπέρμα, spérma) which have notable wing-like fringes.

== Description ==
It is a tree reaching 15 meters in height. Its thin to leathery, hairless, elliptical to oblong leaves are 12.7-17.7 by 5.1-7.6 centimeters. The leaves come to a short tapering tip and have a rounded or shallowly pointed base. The leaves have slender veins that form a network pattern. Its solitary flowers are born on peduncles that are 2.5 centimeters or longer and are positioned axially or opposite leaves. Its sepals form a three-lobed calyx. Its flowers have 6 greenish-yellow petals with orange highlight arranged in two rows of three. The oval outer petals are 1.7 centimeters long with tips that slightly taper to a point. The oval inner petals are 0.8 centimeters long. The flowers have numerous stamen in several rows. The stamen have short filaments, and the tissue connecting the lobes of the anthers is thickened and terminates abruptly at its apex. The anthers dehisce longitudinally. Its flowers have roughly 20 pistils. Its oblong ovaries are about as long as the stamen and contract into a thick styles, which are also as long as the stamen. The styles have a longitudinal channel and their stigma occupy the length of their inward facing surface. Its yellow, oval fruit are 3.8 by 2.5 centimeters. Each fruit has a solitary seed that is an 2.5 long and almost as wide. The oval seeds are flat on one side and keeled on the other. The brown, leathery surface of the seeds forms a wing-like margin with an offset notch at the base.

=== Reproductive biology ===
The pollen of G. monosperma is shed as permanent tetrads.

== Habitat and distribution ==
It has been observed growing in dense forests at elevations of 100–1,500 meters.
