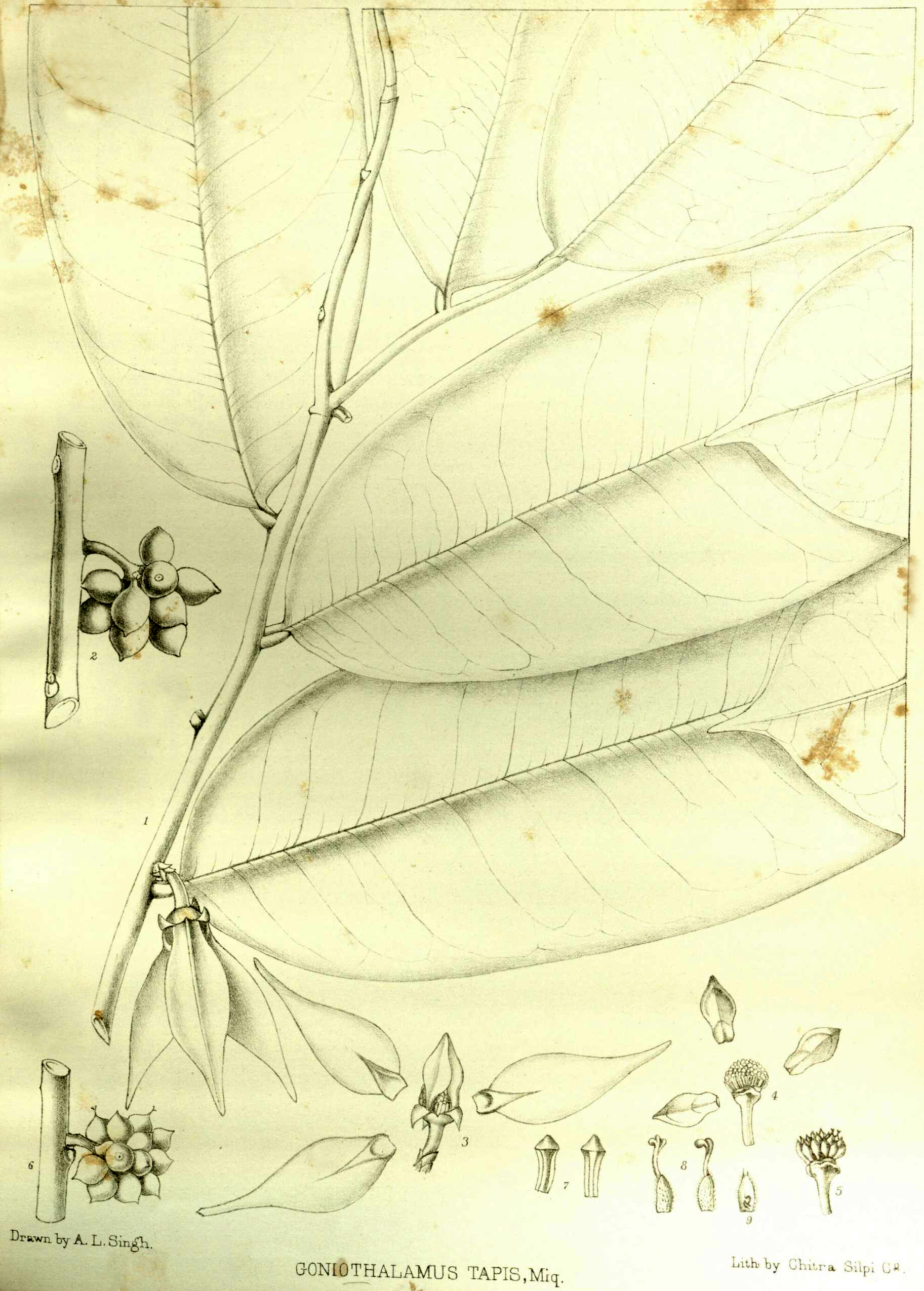
- Botanical illustration of Goniothalamus tapis

Conservation status
- Least Concern (IUCN 3.1)

Scientific classification
- Kingdom: Plantae
- Clade: Embryophytes
- Clade: Tracheophytes
- Clade: Spermatophytes
- Clade: Angiosperms
- Clade: Magnoliids
- Order: Magnoliales
- Family: Annonaceae
- Genus: Goniothalamus
- Species: G. tapis

Binomial name
- Goniothalamus tapis Miq.

Synonyms
- Goniothalamus sumatranus Miq.; Goniothalamus umbrosus J.Sinclair

= Goniothalamus tapis =

Species of plant in the soursop family

Goniothalamus tapis is a species of flowering plant in the family Annonaceae. It is a tree native to Peninsular Malaysia, Sumatra, and Thailand. Friedrich Anton Wilhelm Miquel, the Dutch botanist who first formally described the species, named it after a local vernacular name, Kajoe-tapis, from Pariaman Sumatra where the specimen he examined was found.

== Description ==
It is a tree reaching 15–40 meters (49–131 ft) in height. Its petioles 4.5–11.5 by 1.4–3.4 millimeters and hairless or slightly hairy. Its papery to slightly leathery, oblong to elliptical leaves are 14.5–25.5 by 4.5–8 centimeters (5.7–10.0 by 1.8–3.1 in) long, with short tapering tips and pointed to round bases. The tops of the leaves are matt and hairless while the undersides are hairless to slightly hairy. The leaves have 11–16 pairs of secondary veins emanating from their midribs. Its solitary flowers are born on 6–10 by 1–1.9 millimeters pedicels in axillary to supra-axillary positions. The pedicels are hairless to slightly hairy and have 2–3 bracts. Its oval to triangular, pink to red sepals are 3.5–10 by 3–6.5 millimeters. The sepals are hairless to slightly hairy outside and hairless inside. Its flower have 6 petals in two rows of three. The oval to elliptical outer petals are 2.6–7.0 by 1–2.5 centimeters and have a claw. The outer petals are cream-colored to pale yellow with pink or red highlights. The outer petals are hairless to densely hairy inside and out with a basal hairless path on their inner surface. The inner petals are 10–19 by 2.5–9.5 millimeters with a 1.2–2.5 millimeter-wide claw. The inner leaves are cream-colored to pale yellow with pink or red highlights. The inner petals are slightly to densely hairy outside and have and inner surface that is hairless at the base and granular at the top. Its flowers have 115–185 stamen that are 2.2–3.6 by 0.3–0.5 millimeters. Its flowers have 14–40 carpels with 1.5–2 by 0.4–0.8 millimeter densely hairy ovaries. Its stigma and style together are 1.3–4.2 millimeters long. The warty, hairless style is 0.1–0.5 millimeters wide. The funnel to awl shaped, stigma are hairy to slightly hairy. Its fruit are on 4–16 by 1.6–2.8 millimeters pedicels that are hairless to slightly hairy. The fruit are attached to the pedicel by a negligible to 6 by 1.2–2.3 millimeter stipe. The red, round to elliptical, smooth, hairless to slightly hairy fruit are 7–11 by 10–14 millimeters with rounded to pointed bases and rounded to pointed tips. The fruit have 1 seed each. The pale to brown, smooth to slightly wrinkled, slightly hairy to hairy, oval seeds are 7–9 by 9–12 millimeters.

=== Reproductive biology ===
The pollen of G. tapis is shed as permanent tetrads.

== Habitat and distribution ==
It has been observed growing in rainforests at elevations of 30–900 meters (98–3,000 ft).

== Uses ==
Bioactive molecules extracted from its bark and roots have been reported to inhibit platelet-activating factor receptor binding in tests with rabbit platelets.
