= Goniothalamus aurantiacus =

Conservation status
- Vulnerable (IUCN 3.1)

Scientific classification
- Kingdom: Plantae
- Clade: Embryophytes
- Clade: Tracheophytes
- Clade: Spermatophytes
- Clade: Angiosperms
- Clade: Magnoliids
- Order: Magnoliales
- Family: Annonaceae
- Genus: Goniothalamus
- Species: G. aurantiacus

Binomial name
- Goniothalamus aurantiacus R.M.K.Saunders & Chalermglin

Species of plant

Goniothalamus aurantiacus is a species of flowering plant in the family Annonaceae. It is a tree native to southwestern Thailand. Piya Chalermglin and Richard M.K. Saunders, the botanists who first formally described the species, named it after its orange colored (aurantiacus in Latin) inner petals.

== Description ==
It is a small tree reaching 9 meters in height. Its petioles are 7.5-11 by 1.9-2.7 millimeters and have sparse hairs. Its elliptical leaves have a papery texture and are 23-32 by 5.5-8.5 centimeters with bases and tips that taper to a point. The leaves are hairless on their upper side and have sparse hairs on their underside, particularly on the midrib.

The leaves have 14-21 pairs of secondary veins that emanate from the midrib. Its solitary flowers are in axillary positions on 10-13 by 2-3 millimeter pedicels. The pedicels have 5-9 bracts. Its flowers have 3 green, oval sepals that are 5.5-7.5 by 7–9.5 millimeters. The sepals are hairy on their lower surface and hairless on their upper surface. The flowers have 6 petals in two rows of 3. The yellow, elliptical outer petals are 18-28 by 20-22 millimeters.

The lower surfaces of the outer petals are hairless at their tips, changing to densely hairy at their bases. The upper surfaces of the outer petals have woolly hairs at their tips changing to hairless at their bases. The orange inner petals are 12-19 by 5.5-9 millimeters. The upper and lower surfaces of the inner petals are densely hairy at their tips changing to hairless at their bases.

Its flowers have 50-160 stamens that are 2.4-2.8 by 0.6-0.9 millimeters. Its gynoecium have 4-11 carpels with ovaries that are 2.5-3.8 by 0.6-1 millimeters covered in sparse gold colored hairs. Its pistils lack styles and its stigmas are 2.8-3.6 millimeters long. Its fruit are on 14 by 4 millimeters pedicels. The elliptical, smooth, green fruit are 27-56 millimeters long and have 1-3 seeds. The flat, elliptical seeds are 19-27 by 13–16.5 millimeters with a smooth to wrinkled surface covered in hairs.

== Reproductive biology ==
The pollen of G. aurantiacus is shed as permanent tetrads.

== Habitat and distribution ==
It has been observed growing in shady areas in forests with evergreen and deciduous trees at an elevation of 250-900 meters.
