= Goniothalamus montanus =

Conservation status
- Vulnerable (IUCN 3.1)

Scientific classification
- Kingdom: Plantae
- Clade: Embryophytes
- Clade: Tracheophytes
- Clade: Spermatophytes
- Clade: Angiosperms
- Clade: Magnoliids
- Order: Magnoliales
- Family: Annonaceae
- Genus: Goniothalamus
- Species: G. montanus

Binomial name
- Goniothalamus montanus J.Sinclair

Species of tree

Goniothalamus montanus is a species of flowering plant in the Annonaceae family. It is a tree endemic to Peninsular Malaysia.
