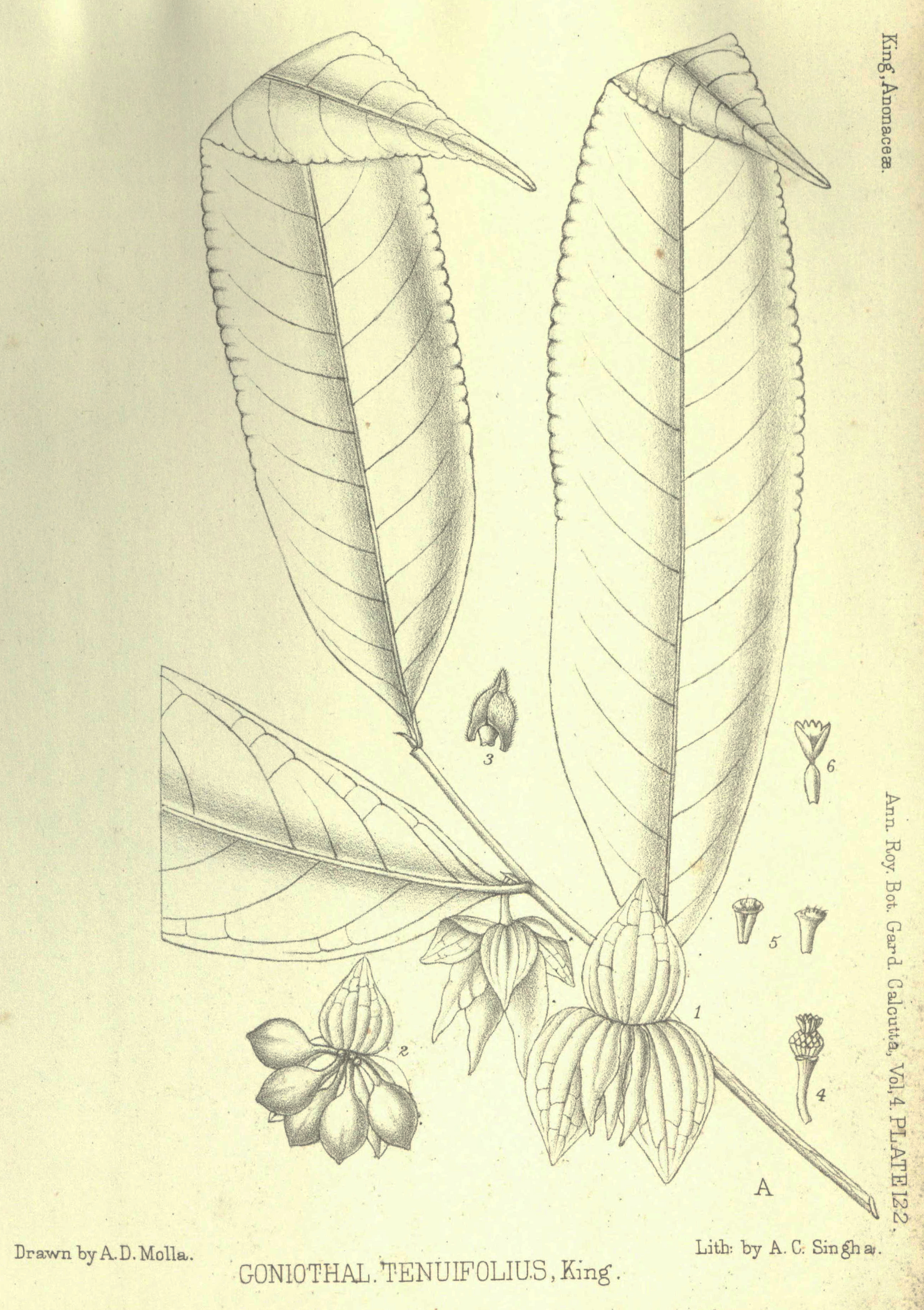
- Botanical illustration of Goniothalamus tenuifolius

Conservation status
- Least Concern (IUCN 3.1)

Scientific classification
- Kingdom: Plantae
- Clade: Embryophytes
- Clade: Tracheophytes
- Clade: Spermatophytes
- Clade: Angiosperms
- Clade: Magnoliids
- Order: Magnoliales
- Family: Annonaceae
- Genus: Goniothalamus
- Species: G. tenuifolius

Binomial name
- Goniothalamus tenuifolius King

Synonyms
- Goniothalamus caudifolius Ridl.; Goniothalamus kunstleri King; Goniothalamus kunstleri var. macranthus King; Goniothalamus tenuifolius var. arborescens King

= Goniothalamus tenuifolius =

Species of plant in the soursop family

Goniothalamus tenuifolius is a species of flowering plant in the family Annonaceae. It is a tree native to Peninsular Malaysia, Thailand and Vietnam. George King, the British botanist who first formally described the species, named it after its slender (tenui- in Latin) leaved (-folius in Latin) foliage.

== Description ==
It is a bush reaching 1.8–2.4 meters (5.9–7.9 ft) in height. Its young branches are hairless and dark colored. Its petioles are 5.1 millimeter long. Its slender, membranous, oblong to lance-shaped leaves are 11.4–17.8 by 2.5–4.4 centimeters (4.49–7.01 by 0.98–1.73 in) with short tapering tips and pointed bases. Its leaves have 8–11 pairs of secondary veins emanating from their midribs. Its drooping, solitary flowers are born on pedicels in axillary positions. The pedicels are 0.9–1.1 centimeters long with 2 basal bracts. Its membranous, hairless, oval, green sepal are 0.7–1.9 by 0.5–1.5 centimeters with pointed to tapering tips. Its flowers have 6 petals in two rows of three. The white, lance-shaped, thin, leathery outer petals are 1.0–4.0 by 0.4–1.5 centimeters with tapering tips. The outer petals are covered in fine hairs. The oval inner petals are 5–14 by 3–8 millimeters with tapering tips. The outer petals are covered in fine hairs. Its flowers have few narrow, short ovaries, each with 1–2 ovules. Its long styles are thicker toward their apex. Its funnel-shaped stigma have a toothed edge. Its fruiting pedicel are 3–18 millimeters long. Its oval fruit 0.7 1-1.3 centimeters long and have persistent calyx. Its fruit have 1–2 seeds.

=== Reproductive biology ===
The pollen of G. tenuifolius is shed as permanent tetrads.

== Habitat and distribution ==
It has been observed growing in lowland forests at elevations of 50 to 900 meters (160 to 2,950 ft).

== Uses ==
Extracts from the leaves have been reported to have free radical scavenging activity using in vitro tests.
