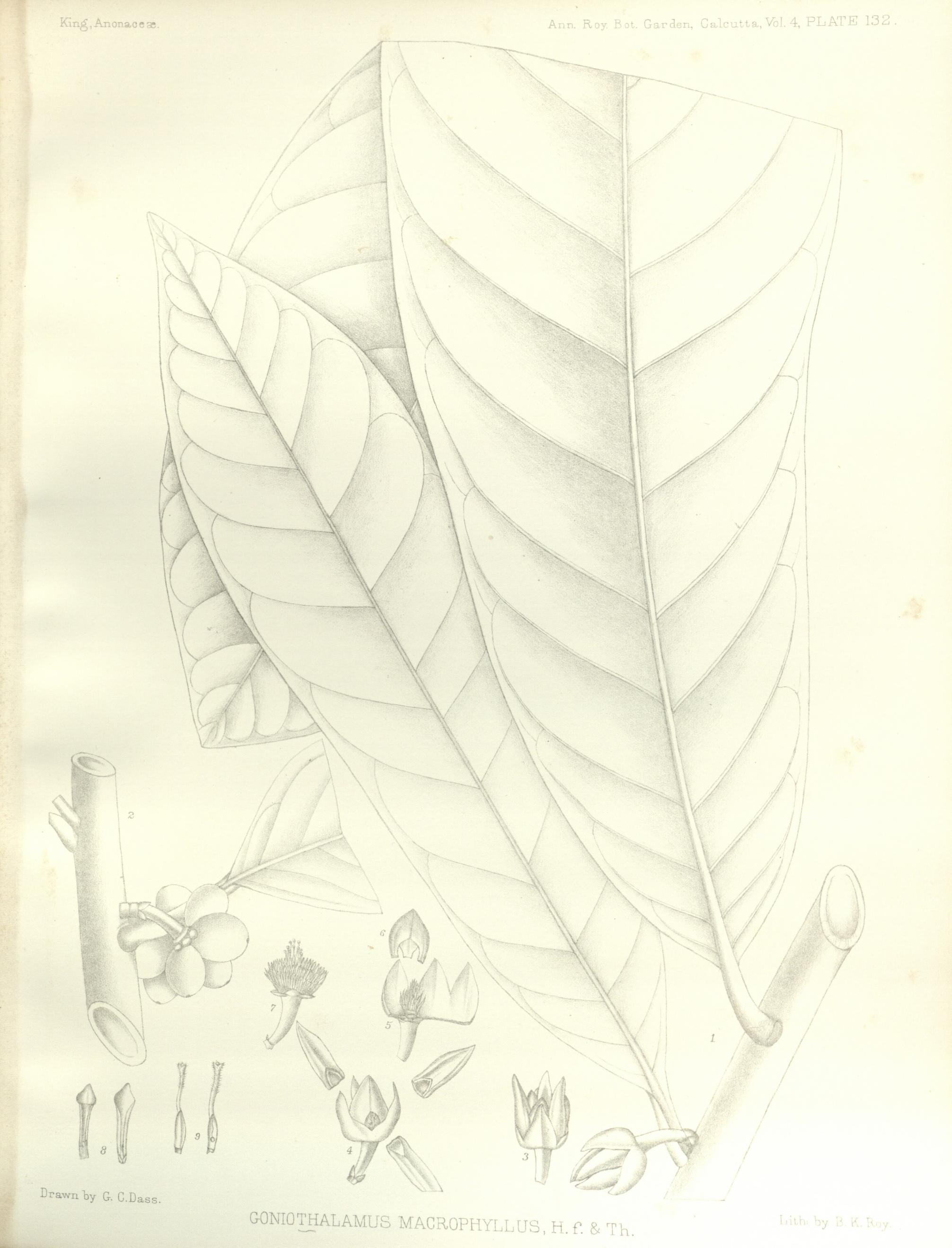
- Botanical illustration of Goniothalamus macrophyllus leaf, branch and flower parts.

Scientific classification
- Kingdom: Plantae
- Clade: Tracheophytes
- Clade: Angiosperms
- Clade: Magnoliids
- Order: Magnoliales
- Family: Annonaceae
- Genus: Goniothalamus
- Species: G. macrophyllus

Binomial name
- Goniothalamus macrophyllus (Blume) Zoll.

Synonyms
- Goniothalamus forbesii Baker f. Goniothalamus macrophyllus var. kerrii Bân; Goniothalamus macrophyllus var. lanceolatus Bân; Polyalthia macrophylla (Blume) Blume; Unona macrophylla Blume

= Goniothalamus macrophyllus =

Species of plant

Goniothalamus macrophyllus is a species of plant in the family Annonaceae. It is native to Borneo, Java, the Malay Peninsula, Sumatra and Thailand. Carl Ludwig Blume, the German-Dutch botanist who first formally described the species using the basionym Unona macrophylla, named it after its large leaves (Latinized forms of Greek μακρός, makrós and φύλλον, phúllon). It is commonly called Penawar Hitam in the Malaya Peninsula, Ki Cantung in Indonesia, Limpanas Putih in Brunei, and Chin Dok Diao in Thailand.

== Description ==
It is a bush or small tree reaching 10 meters in height. Its moderately leathery leaves are 26–59 by 6-15.5 centimeters and vary in shape from narrow to broadly elliptical. The upper surface of the leaves are hairless or sparsely hairy. The undersides of the leaves are hairless and have a characteristic granular texture. The tips of the leaves either come to an abrupt point or taper to a longer point. The base of the leaves come to a point or are wedge shaped. The leaves have 12-23 pairs of veins emanating from their midribs. Its petioles are 6–28 by 2.3-5 millimeters and hairless or sparsely hairy. Its solitary flowers grow on 5-11.5 by 1.2-3 millimeter pedicels slightly above axillary positions. The pedicels are hairless or sparsely hairy and have 3-8 bracts. It has 3 greenish-red to purple, oval to triangular sepals that are 6–30 by 4-12.5 millimeters. The margins of the sepals can sometimes be fused at their base. The sepals are hairless or sparsely hairy on both their upper and lower surfaces. Its flowers have 6 petals in two rows of three. The oval to narrowly elliptical outer petals are 10–28 by 4.5-11.5 millimeters. The outer petals are cream colored with pink highlights on their inner surface. The inner surface of the outer petals is sparsely hairy while the outer surface is sparsely hairy. The cream-colored inner petals are 7–15 by 4-9 millimeters and have a 1.3-2.1 millimeter wide claw. The outer surface of the inner petals is sparsely hairy, while the inner surface is covered in velvety hairs. Its flowers have 65-180 stamen that are 1.8-4.6 by 0.2-0.7 millimeters. Its flowers have 11-36 carpels. Its carpels have ovaries that are 1–3 by 0.3-0.8 millimeter and densely covered in gold to red-brown hairs arranged in rows, except at their apex. Its stigma are funnel-shaped and sparsely to densely hairy. Its fruit are on 7–19 by 1.7-2.7 millimeter pedicels that are hairless or sparsely hairy. The smooth, elliptical, yellow to red fruit are 8–15 by 7.5-10 millimeters and have 1-2 seeds. The base of the fruit are wedge-shaped and their tips are rounded or tapering. The slightly flattened, elliptical, seeds are 8.5-12 by 6.5-8.5 millimeters. The surface of the seeds are smooth to slightly wrinkled, and hairless to sparsely covered in white hairs.

=== Reproductive biology ===
The pollen of G. macrophyllus is shed as permanent tetrads.

== Habitat and distribution ==
It has been observed growing in forests with loamy, clay or sandy soils at elevations of 1 - 1300 meters.

== Uses ==
It has been reported to be used as a traditional medicine for a variety of ailments in the Malaya Peninsula, Indonesia, Brunei, and Thailand. However, bioactive compounds extracted from its roots have been reported to cytotoxic activity in tests with cultured human cancer cells.
