= Goniothalamus chartaceus =

Conservation status
- Data Deficient (IUCN 3.1)

Scientific classification
- Kingdom: Plantae
- Clade: Embryophytes
- Clade: Tracheophytes
- Clade: Spermatophytes
- Clade: Angiosperms
- Clade: Magnoliids
- Order: Magnoliales
- Family: Annonaceae
- Genus: Goniothalamus
- Species: G. chartaceus

Binomial name
- Goniothalamus chartaceus H.L.Li

Species of plant

Goniothalamus chartaceus is a species of flowering plant in the family Annonaceae. It is a shrub or tree native to northern Vietnam. Hui-lin Li, the Chinese botanist who first formally described the species, named it after its papery (chartaceus in Latin) leaves.

== Description ==
It is a bush or small tree. It has smooth, black branches. Its petioles are about 5 millimeters long. Its olive-colored, smooth, oblong, papery leaves are 11–17 by 1.7–2.8 centimeters and have minute spots. The leaves have a pointed base, come to a short blunt point at their tips and have slightly rolled margins. The leaves have 10–12 lateral veins emanating from either side of the midrib. Its solitary flowers are in axillary positions on 1.2 millimeter long pedicels. The pedicels are subtended by 3 bracts that are 1-1.5 millimeters long and come to a point at their tips. Its 3 smooth, leathery, oval sepals are 9 by 4 millimeters and come to a point at their tips. Its flowers have 6 petals in two rows of 3. The outer, slender, lance-shaped petals are 1.8 centimeters long and come to a point at their tips. The inner, oval to triangular petals are 1 centimeter long and come to a shallow point at their tips. The flowers have numerous stamen about 1.5 millimeters long and numerous carpels that are covered in small, brown, matted hairs.

=== Reproductive biology ===
The pollen of G. chartaceus is shed as permanent tetrads.
