= Goniothalamus sawtehii =

Scientific classification
- Kingdom: Plantae
- Clade: Tracheophytes
- Clade: Angiosperms
- Clade: Magnoliids
- Order: Magnoliales
- Family: Annonaceae
- Genus: Goniothalamus
- Species: G. sawtehii

Binomial name
- Goniothalamus sawtehii C.E.C.Fisch.

Species of plant in the soursop family

Goniothalamus sawtehii is a species of plant in the family Annonaceae. It is native to Myanmar and Thailand. Cecil Ernest Claude Fischer the botanists who first formally described the species, named it in honor of Maung Saw Teh, a plant collector who provided the specimen examined by Fischer.

== Description ==
It is a tree reaching 6.1 meters (20 ft) in height. Its dark-gray branches are hairless, but its twigs are covered in tawny matted hairs. Its papery, elliptical leaves are 9–19 by 3–6 centimeters (3.5–7.5 by 1.2–2.4 in), have a tapering tips and bases that are rounded or wedge-shaped. The leaves have minute translucent dots and are initially covered in tawny, matted hair on both sides, but later become hairless on their upper surface. The leaves have 9–11 pairs of secondary veins emanating from their midribs that arch and join one another near the leaf margin. Its petioles are 4–7 millimeters long and covered in tawny, matted hairs. Its solitary flowers are in axillary positions and born on pedicels that are 1–1.5 centimeters long. The pedicels are covered in tawny, matted hairs and have 2–3 oval bracts, also covered in tawny, matted hairs, that come to a point at their tips. Its 3 rounded sepals are fused at their base and have a blunt, elongated rigid tip. The sepals are covered in tawny, matted hairs. Its flowers have 6 petals arranged in two rows of three. The oval to lance-shaped outer petals are 2.3–4.3 by 1.2–2.3 centimeters, have a shallow tapering tip and a short broad claw at base. The outer leaves are covered in dense tawny to golden hairs on both sides except the inner surface of the claw. The lateral margins of the outer petals are curved back. The rhomboid to oval inner petals are 1.5 by 0.5–0.8 centimeters. The tips of the inner leaves have tawny to brown, matted hair, taper to a blunt point, and are adherent with one another. The base of the inner leaves is narrower and hairless. Its flowers have numerous stamen that are 2 millimeters long. The connective tissue between the lobes of the linear anthers extends to form a dome-shaped cap. Its flowers have 40–100 hairless, slender, awl-shaped carpels that are about 3 millimeters long. Its fruit are on pedicels that are 2 centimeters long. The fruit are 1.5–1.8 centimeters long.

=== Reproductive biology ===
The pollen of G. sawtehii is shed as permanent tetrads.

== Habitat and distribution ==
It has been observed growing in evergreen forests at elevations of 30–900 meters (98–3,000 ft).

== Uses ==
Bioactive molecules isolated from its leaves and twigs have been reported to have cytotoxic activity in tests with cultured human cancers cells.
