= Goniothalamus dewildei =

Conservation status
- Endangered (IUCN 3.1)

Scientific classification
- Kingdom: Plantae
- Clade: Embryophytes
- Clade: Tracheophytes
- Clade: Spermatophytes
- Clade: Angiosperms
- Clade: Magnoliids
- Order: Magnoliales
- Family: Annonaceae
- Genus: Goniothalamus
- Species: G. dewildei

Binomial name
- Goniothalamus dewildei R.M.K.Saunders

Plant species

Goniothalamus dewildei is a species of flowering plant in the family Annonaceae. It is a shrub or tree native to the island of Sumatra in Indonesia.
