= Goniothalamus curtisii =

Conservation status
- Least Concern (IUCN 3.1)

Scientific classification
- Kingdom: Plantae
- Clade: Embryophytes
- Clade: Tracheophytes
- Clade: Spermatophytes
- Clade: Angiosperms
- Clade: Magnoliids
- Order: Magnoliales
- Family: Annonaceae
- Genus: Goniothalamus
- Species: G. curtisii

Binomial name
- Goniothalamus curtisii King

Species of tree

Goniothalamus curtisii is a species of flowering plant in the family Annonaceae. It is a tree endemic to Peninsular Malaysia.

== Description ==
It is a bush or small tree. It has narrow to oblong leaves with smooth upper surfaces and lightly hairy undersides. It has solitary flowers with large green sepals. The petals are yellow with red highlights and covered with velvety hair. It has numerous anthers.

=== Reproductive biology ===
The pollen of G. curtisii is shed as permanent tetrads.
