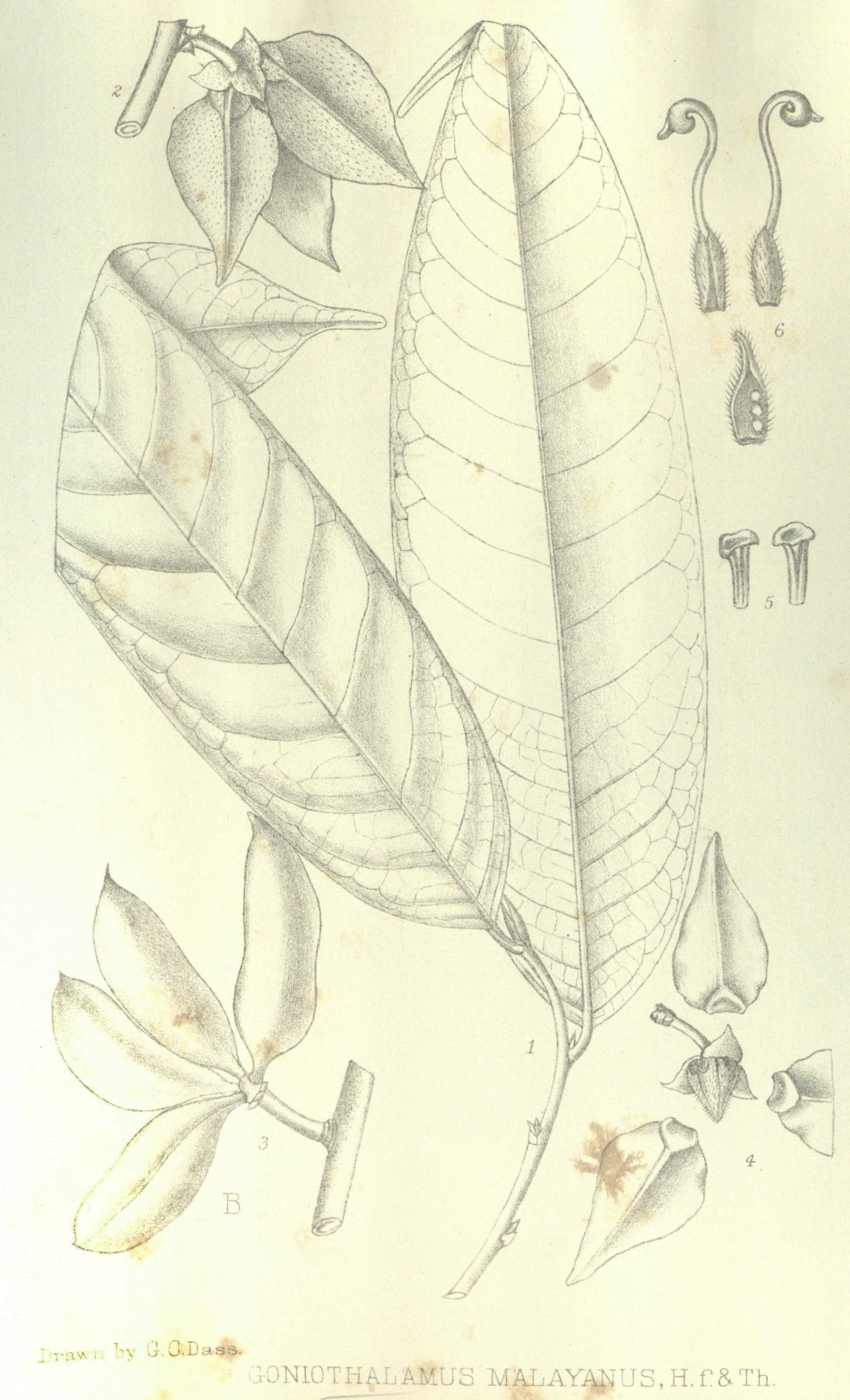
- Botanical illustration of Goniothalamus malayanus.

Conservation status
- Least Concern (IUCN 3.1)

Scientific classification
- Kingdom: Plantae
- Clade: Tracheophytes
- Clade: Angiosperms
- Clade: Magnoliids
- Order: Magnoliales
- Family: Annonaceae
- Genus: Goniothalamus
- Species: G. malayanus

Binomial name
- Goniothalamus malayanus Hook.f. & Thomson

Synonyms
- Goniothalamus dispermus Miq.; Goniothalamus malayanus var. dispermus (Miq.) Boerl.; Goniothalamus malayanus var. slingerlandtianus (Scheff.) Boerl.; Goniothalamus puncticulatus Boerl. & Koord.-Schum.; Goniothalamus slingerlandtianus Scheff.; Goniothalamus ventristylus Boerl. & Koord.-Schum.

= Goniothalamus malayanus =

Species of plant

Goniothalamus malayanus is a species of flowering plant in the family Annonaceae. It is a tree native to Borneo, the Malay Peninsula, the Nicobar Islands, Sumatra and Thailand. Joseph Dalton Hooker and Thomas Thomson, the British botanists who first formally described the species, named it after part of its habitat range, British Malaya (now referred to as the Malay Peninsula).

== Description ==
It is a tree reaching 15 meters in height. Its bark is finely wrinkled and light colored with parts covered in greenish-brown hair. Its oval to elliptical leaves are 12.5-28 by 3.5-9 centimeters with tips that come to a tapering point and bases that pointed or rounded. The leaves are paper to leathery. The upper surface of the leaves are somewhat shiny and hairless or sparsely hairy, while the underside is hairless and pale. Its leaves have 10-18 pairs of secondary veins emanating from their midribs. Its slightly hairy to hairy petioles are 5–14 by 1.5-3.3 millimeters. Its flowering pedicels are 8–21 by 1-1.7 millimeters with dense yellow hairs. The pedicels are in axillary positions. Its green, oval to triangular sepals are 2–8 by 3–7.5 millimeters with margins that are fused at their base. The sepals come to a point at their tips. The inner surface of the sepals are densely hairy, while outer surface is hairless or slightly hairy. Its solitary flowers have 6 petals in two rows of three. The green-yellow, oval, outer petals are 1.6–6.2 × 0.7–3.2 centimeters. The inner surface of the outer petals are slightly to densely covered in small dark, silky hairs except near their base. The outer surface of the outer petals are densely hairy. The yellow to gold-colored inner petals are 0.77–1.4 × 0.4–0.75 centimeters and have a 1–2.6 millimeter wide claw at their base. The inner petals are densely hairy on their outer surfaces, but hairless on their inner surfaces. Its flowers have 80-250 stamen that are 1.3-2 by 0.3-0.6 millimeters. The connective tissue between the lobes of the anther terminates abruptly at its apex and is hairy. Its flowers have 8-20 carpels with ovaries that are 1-1.6 by 0.3-0.7 millimeters. The ovaries are covered in dense rows of hair. Together the hairless style and stigma are 1.6-4.2 by 0.1-0.2 millimeters. Its dark red, ellipsoid, slightly hairy to hairy fruit are 1.6-4.0 by 0.8-1.7 centimeters with smooth surfaces. The fruit are attached to the pedicels by 2.5-10 by 1.2-2.7 millimeter stipes. Its fruit have 1-3 smooth, flattened, ellipsoid seeds that are 1.3-2.0 by 0.55-1.3 centimeters. The seeds are sparsely hairy with patches of long white or gold-colored hairs.

=== Reproductive biology ===
The pollen of G. malayanus is shed as permanent tetrads.

== Habitat and distribution ==
It has been observed growing in lowland rain forests and the drier parts of peat swamp forests from sea level to 400 metres elevation.

== Uses ==
Bioactive molecules extracted from its tissues have been reported to have antibacterial activity in tests with Gram positive and Gram negative bacteria.
