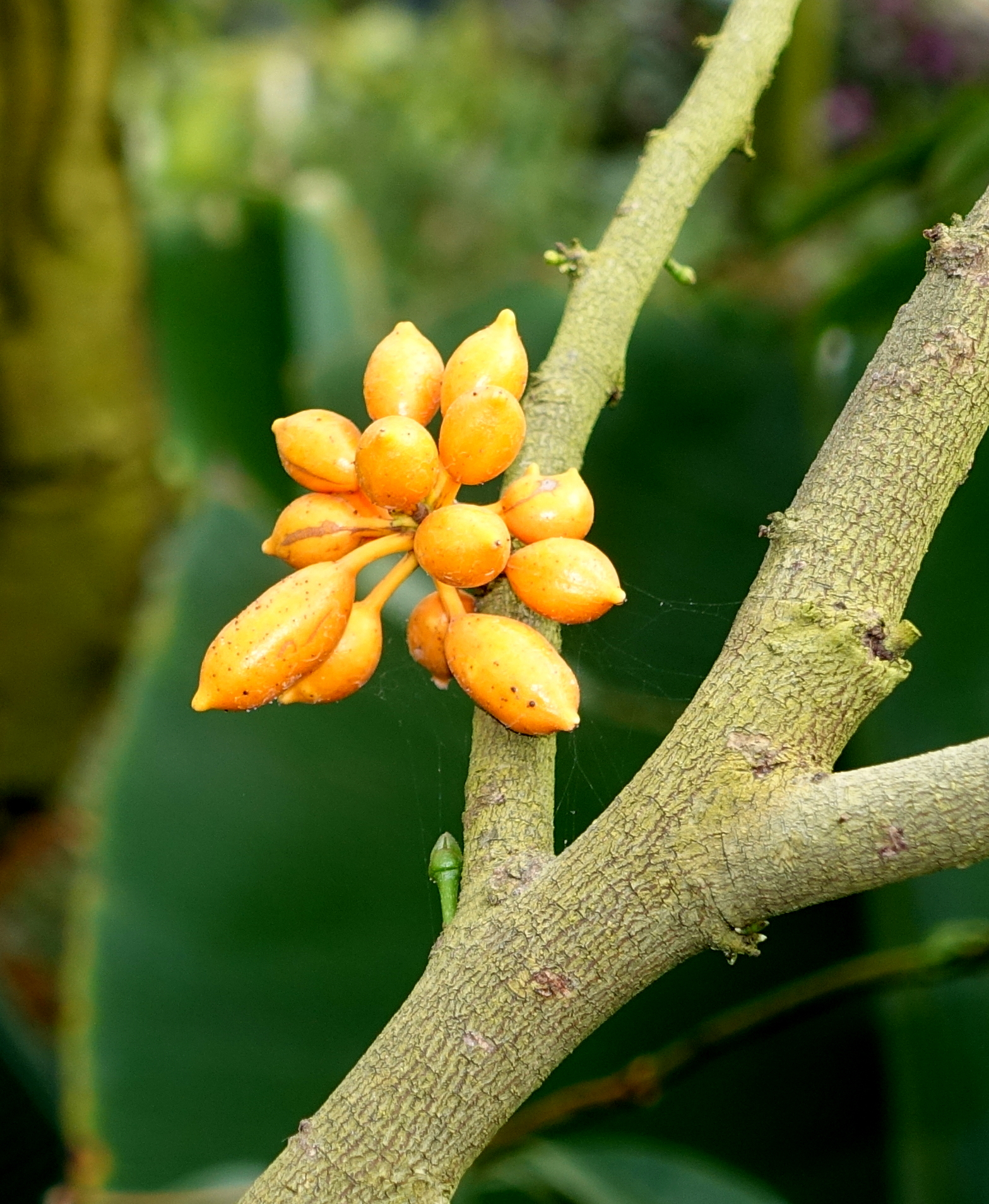

Conservation status
- Vulnerable (IUCN 3.1)

Scientific classification
- Kingdom: Plantae
- Clade: Embryophytes
- Clade: Tracheophytes
- Clade: Spermatophytes
- Clade: Angiosperms
- Clade: Magnoliids
- Order: Magnoliales
- Family: Annonaceae
- Genus: Goniothalamus
- Species: G. amuyon

Binomial name
- Goniothalamus amuyon (Blanco) Merr.

Synonyms
- Polyalthia sasakii Yamam. Uvaria amuyon Blanco

= Goniothalamus amuyon =

Species of plant in the soursop family

Goniothalamus amuyon is a species of plant in the family Annonaceae. It is native to southern Taiwan and the Philippines. In the Philippine provinces of Batangas and Bohol it is commonly referred to as amúyong or amúyon. In the Ilocos region and Pangasinan province it is commonly referred to as sagiát. Francisco Manuel Blanco, the Spanish Augustinian friar and botanist who first formally described the species using the basionym Uvaria amuyon, named it after its Tagalog name.

== Description ==
It is a tree reaching 3 to 15 meters (9.8 to 49 ft) in height. Its lance-shaped leaves are hairless and come to a point at their tips. The leaves are arranged in an alternate pattern. Its flowers are solitary, or sometimes in pairs, and axillary. It has 3 fleshy, green sepals. It has 6 long, greenish-yellow, fleshy petals arranged in two rows of 3. The inner petals unite to form a cone. Its flowers have more than 100 stamen with no filaments. The anthers are attached directly to the receptacle and arranged in a triangle. Its gynoecium consist of 14 to 18 pistils that lack styles. Its stigma are long, curved and ribbed. Its oval fruit are about an inch long and have 3–5 cinnamon colored seeds. The fruit have a mild pleasant smell.

=== Reproductive biology ===
The pollen of G. amuyon is shed as permanent tetrads. Seed germination in laboratory conditions has been optimized at 30 °C (86 °F) in light for 4 weeks.

=== Uses ===
It is reported as being widely used as a traditional medicine for a variety of ailments. However, extracts containing bioactive molecules have been observed to have cytotoxic activity against cancer cells and teratogenic potential in studies with mice.
