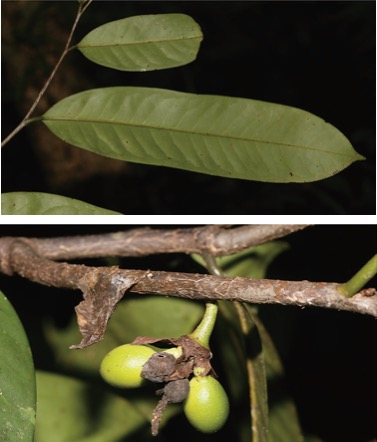
- Composite color images of Goniothalamus calvicarpus leaf, branch and fruit.

Scientific classification
- Kingdom: Plantae
- Clade: Tracheophytes
- Clade: Angiosperms
- Clade: Magnoliids
- Order: Magnoliales
- Family: Annonaceae
- Genus: Goniothalamus
- Species: G. calvicarpus

Binomial name
- Goniothalamus calvicarpus Craib

= Goniothalamus calvicarpus =

Species of plant

Goniothalamus calvicarpus is a species of plant in the family Annonaceae. It is native to China, Laos and Thailand. William Grant Craib, the British botanist who first formally described the species, named it after its hairless fruit (calvus and -carpus in Latin).

== Description ==
It is a tree reaching 3–4 meters in height. Its young branches have fine rust colored hairs, while mature branches are smooth, dark brown, with a ribbed surface and prominent lenticels. Its petioles are 5 millimeters long with a channel on their upper surface. Its moderately leathery, oblong leaves are 19–29 by 4–6 centimeters. The leaves have 15–17 pairs of secondary veins emanating from the midrib. The margins of the leaves recurve. Its solitary flowers are in axillary positions on 8–19 millimeter long pedicels. Its 3 oval sepals 11–18.5 by 8–15.5 millimeters and have hairs on both surfaces. Its flowers have 6 petals in two rows of 3. The outer petals are 21–46 by 4.5–18 millimeters with fine hairs on both surfaces. The inner petals are coherent at their base. Its flowers have 75–120 stamen that are 2 millimeters long. Its gynoecium have 15–35 carpels that are hairless and 1 millimeter high with stigma that are 2 millimeters long. Its seeds have slightly wrinkled surfaces.

== Reproductive biology ==
The pollen of G. calvicarpus is shed as permanent tetrads.

== Habitat and distribution ==
It has been observed growing near streams with evergreen and deciduous trees at an elevation of 250–1500 meters.
