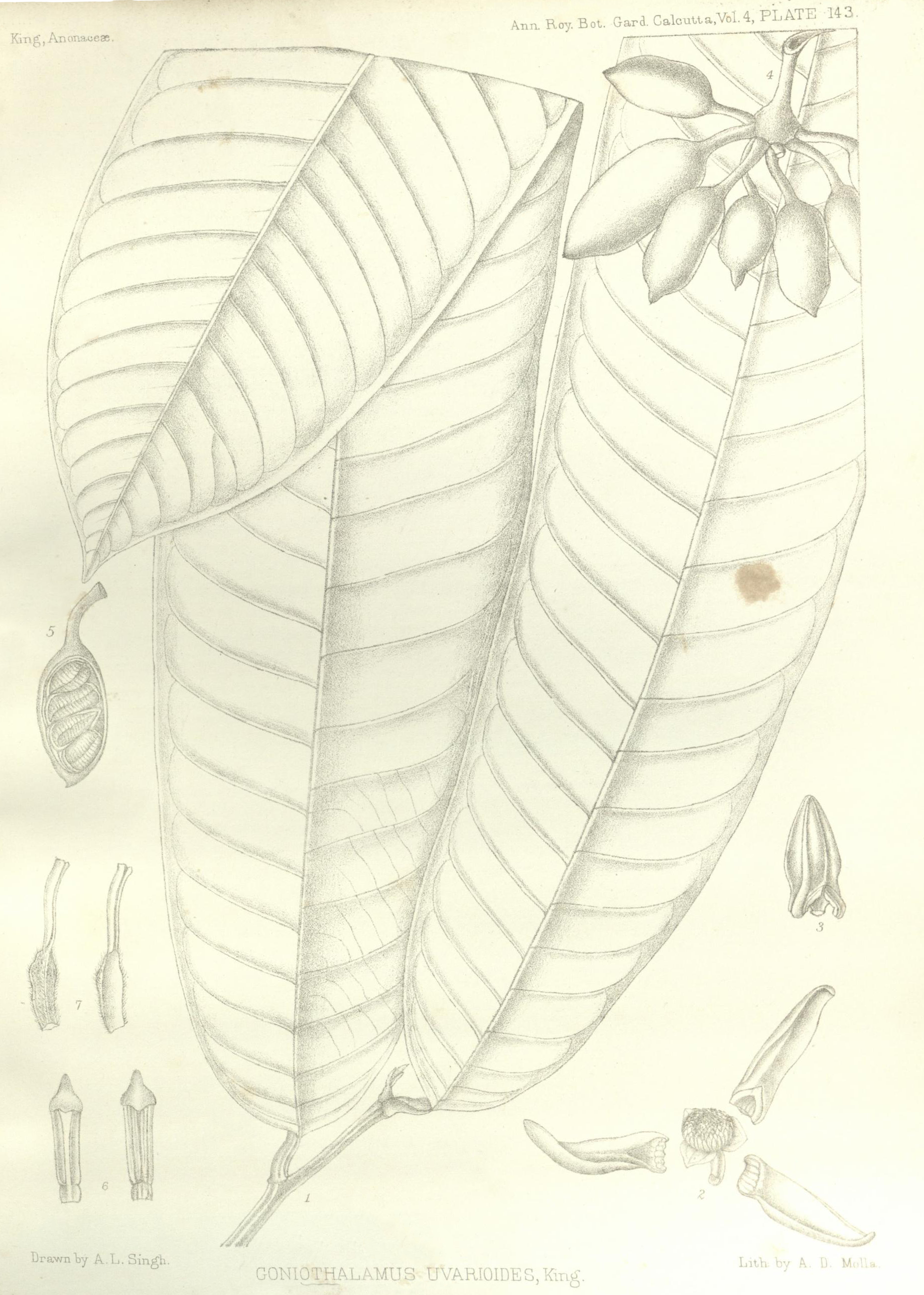
- Botanical illustration of Goniothalamus uvarioides

Scientific classification
- Kingdom: Plantae
- Clade: Tracheophytes
- Clade: Angiosperms
- Clade: Magnoliids
- Order: Magnoliales
- Family: Annonaceae
- Genus: Goniothalamus
- Species: G. uvarioides

Binomial name
- Goniothalamus uvarioides King

Synonyms
- Goniothalamus pendulifolius Ridl.

= Goniothalamus uvarioides =

Species of plant in the soursop family

Goniothalamus uvarioides is a species of plant in the family Annonaceae. It is native to Peninsular Malaysia and Thailand. George King, the British botanist who first formally described the species, named it after its fruit which he thought resembled those of the genus Uvaria more than those of Goniothalamus.

== Description ==
It is a bush reaching 1.8 to 4.6 meters (5.9 to 15.1 ft) in height. Its petioles are 1–3.5 centimeters long and have a channel. Its oblong to oval, somewhat leathery leaves are 32–48 centimeters (13–19 in) long with minute wedge-shaped bases. Its leaves have 22–35 pairs of secondary veins emanating from their midribs that arch to meet one another at the leaf margins. Its flowers are on pedicels that are 1–1.6 centimeters long. Its leathery, rounded sepals are 1.2–1.6 centimeters long and covered in fine hairs. Its flowers have 6 petals in two rows of three. The very leathery, yellow, broad, lance-shaped outer petals are 3.8 centimeters long with thickened bases. The very leathery, yellow, broad, lance-shaped inner petals are 2.5–3 centimeters long with contracted at bases. Its flower have stamen with connective tissue between the lobes of the anthers that extend upward to form a conical apex. Its flowers have carpels with hairy ovaries, cylindrical styles and small stigma with a cleft. Its oblong, hairy fruit are 3.1–4.4 by 1.5–1.8 centimeters with tapering tips and bases. The fruit have 4–5 wrinkled seeds that are 1.3 centimeters long. The fruit are attached to their pedicel by stipes that are 1.1–1.8 by 0.3 centimeters.

=== Reproductive biology ===
The pollen of G. uvarioides is shed as permanent tetrads.

== Habitat and distribution ==
It has been observed growing in lowland forests at elevations of 100 to 450 meters (330 to 1,480 ft).
