= Goniothalamus rhynchantherus =

Conservation status
- Vulnerable (IUCN 3.1)

Scientific classification
- Kingdom: Plantae
- Clade: Tracheophytes
- Clade: Angiosperms
- Clade: Magnoliids
- Order: Magnoliales
- Family: Annonaceae
- Genus: Goniothalamus
- Species: G. rhynchantherus

Binomial name
- Goniothalamus rhynchantherus Dunn

Species of flowering plant

Goniothalamus rhynchantherus is a species of flowering plant in the Annonaceae family. It is a shrub or tree native to the southern Western Ghats of Kerala and Tamil Nadu in southwestern India. It grows from 5–8 metres tall. It grows in wet evergreen rain forest from 600 to 1,200 metres elevation. It is threatened with habitat loss from deforestation to expand plantations, dams, and roads. The IUCN Red List assesses the species as Vulnerable.
