= Goniothalamus salicina =

Conservation status
- Vulnerable (IUCN 2.3)

Scientific classification
- Kingdom: Plantae
- Clade: Tracheophytes
- Clade: Angiosperms
- Clade: Magnoliids
- Order: Magnoliales
- Family: Annonaceae
- Genus: Goniothalamus
- Species: G. salicina

Binomial name
- Goniothalamus salicina Hook.f. & Thomson

Species of flowering plant

Goniothalamus salicina is a species of plant in the Annonaceae family. It is endemic to Sri Lanka.
