= Goniothalamus acehensis =

Scientific classification
- Kingdom: Plantae
- Clade: Embryophytes
- Clade: Tracheophytes
- Clade: Angiosperms
- Clade: Magnoliids
- Order: Magnoliales
- Family: Annonaceae
- Genus: Goniothalamus
- Species: G. acehensis

Binomial name
- Goniothalamus acehensis Saunders

Species of flowering plant

Goniothalamus acehensis is a plant in the family Annonaceae. It is native to Sumatra.
