= Goniothalamus undulatus =

Conservation status
- Vulnerable (IUCN 3.1)

Scientific classification
- Kingdom: Plantae
- Clade: Embryophytes
- Clade: Tracheophytes
- Clade: Spermatophytes
- Clade: Angiosperms
- Clade: Magnoliids
- Order: Magnoliales
- Family: Annonaceae
- Genus: Goniothalamus
- Species: G. undulatus

Binomial name
- Goniothalamus undulatus Ridl.

Species of plant in the soursop family

Goniothalamus undulatus is a species of flowering plant in the family Annonaceae. It is a shrub or tree native to Peninsular Thailand and southern Myanmar. Henry Nicholas Ridley, the English botanist who first formally described the species, named it after the wavy (undulatus in Latin) edges of its leaves.

== Description ==
It is a bush reaching 1.5 meters (4 ft 11 in) in height. Its oblong, hairless leaves are 17.8 by 7 centimeters (7.0 by 2.8 in) with wedge shaped bases, cusped tips and wavy margins. The leaves have 11 pairs of secondary veins emanating from their midribs. Its petioles are 1 centimeters long and covered in fine hairs. Its flowers are born on pedicels that are 2.5 centimeters long. Its 3 red, oval, ribbed, hairy sepals are 0.6 centimeters long. Its flowers have 6 petals arranged in two rows of three. Its red, leathery, oval to lance-shaped, hairy outer petals are 1.5–3.2 by 0.6–1.75 centimeters long. The margins of the outer petals are rolled back. Its triangular, hairy inner petals are 0.9–1.25 centimeters long. Its flower have 10–54 carpels. Its fruit have stipes that are 6.5–16 millimeters long.

=== Reproductive biology ===
The pollen of G. undulatus is shed as permanent tetrads.

== Habitat and distribution ==
It has been observed growing in evergreen forests at elevations of 50 to 700 meters (160 to 2,300 ft).

== Uses ==
Bioactive molecules extracted from its roots have been reported to be cytotoxic in tests with cultured human cancer cell lines.
