= Goniothalamus grandiflorus =

Conservation status
- Least Concern (IUCN 3.1)

Scientific classification
- Kingdom: Plantae
- Clade: Embryophytes
- Clade: Tracheophytes
- Clade: Spermatophytes
- Clade: Angiosperms
- Clade: Magnoliids
- Order: Magnoliales
- Family: Annonaceae
- Genus: Goniothalamus
- Species: G. grandiflorus

Binomial name
- Goniothalamus grandiflorus (Warb.) Boerl.

Synonyms
- Beccariodendron grandiflorum Warb.; Oxymitra macrantha Hemsl.

Species of plant

Goniothalamus grandiflorus is a species of rainforest tree in the Custard Apple Family Annonaceae. It is native to New Guinea and the Solomon Islands. It was first formally described by Otto Warburg, a German-Jewish botanist, using the basionym Beccariodendron grandiflorum after its big, dark red flowers. These flowers are borne directly on the trunk and major branches (cauliflory), the largest of all cauliflorous flowers.

== Description ==
It is a tree with gray smooth branches. Its young branches have rust colored hairs. Its petioles are 1 centimeters long. Its hairless, elliptical to oblong leaves are 20–25 by 8-9 centimeters with tips that taper to a short point and bases that come to a shallow point. The upper surface of leaves are bright colored while the undersides are paler. The leaves have 9-12 pairs of secondary veins emanating from their midribs. Its flowers are on 15 millimeter long pedicels. Its 3 sepals are 10 millimeters wide and 15 millimeters long and are conjoined at their margins for 5 millimeters at their base. The sepals come to a shallow point. Its flowers have 6 petals in two whorls of 3. The outer petals are 13 centimeters long (occasionally as much as seven inches (18 centimeters) in length) and 12 millimeters wide. The inner surface of the outer petals have brown hairs. The inner petals are 15 by 15 millimeters. Its anthers are 2 millimeters long. Each of its flowers produces a multiple fruit, consisting of many carpels, each with 4-6 ovules. The large fruit consists of up to 40 oval, brown, wrinkled berries. each developing from one carpel, on short stalks, resembling a cluster of large grapes. Each berry in the fruit has 4-6 seeds.

=== Reproductive biology ===
The pollen of G. grandiflorus is shed as permanent tetrads.

=== Uses ===
Bioactive molecules extracted from its bark, leaves and flowers have been reported to have antibacterial activity against both Gram negative and Gram positive bacteria.
