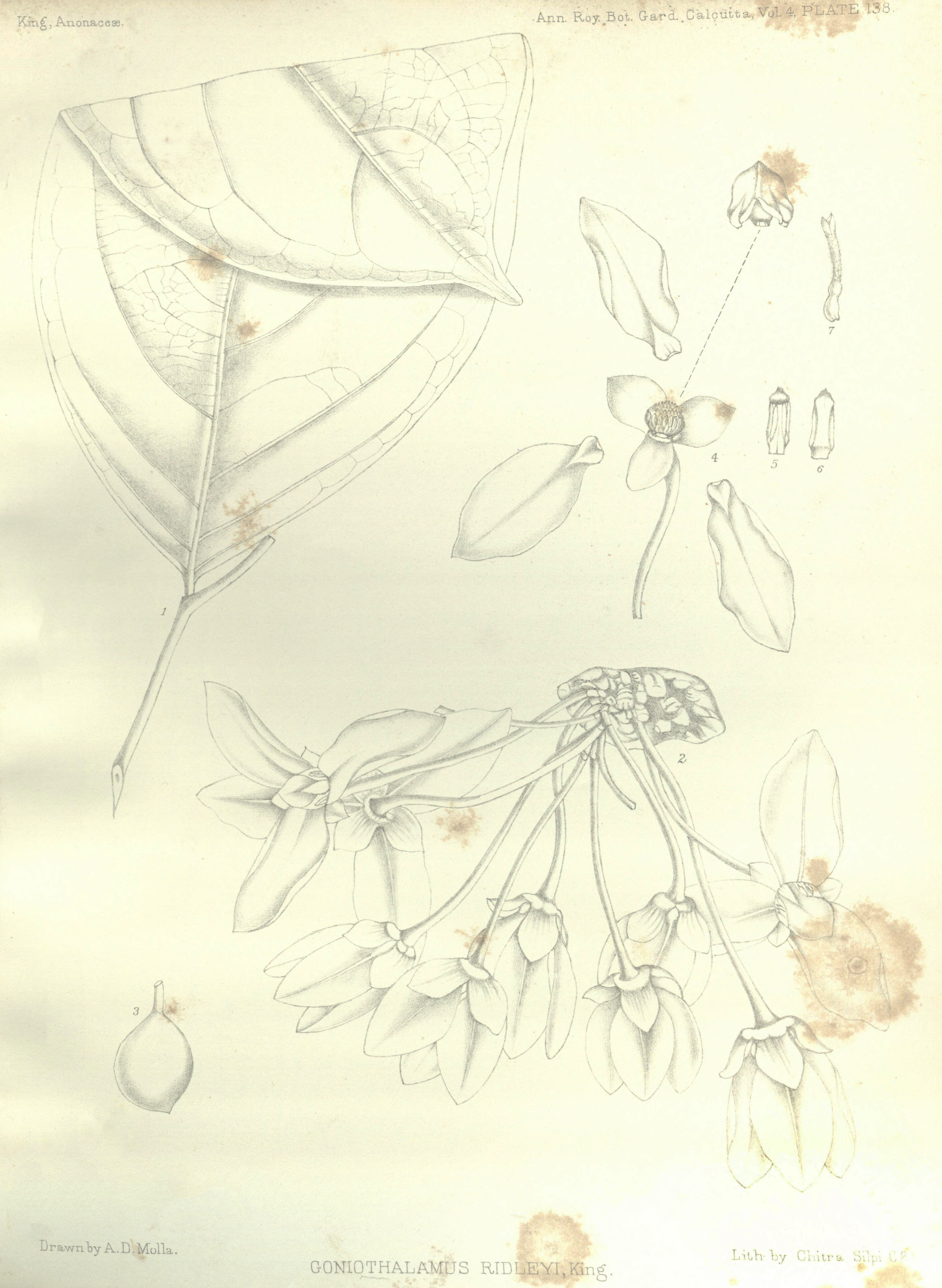
- Botanical illustration of Goniothalamus ridleyi.

Conservation status
- Least Concern (IUCN 3.1)

Scientific classification
- Kingdom: Plantae
- Clade: Embryophytes
- Clade: Tracheophytes
- Clade: Spermatophytes
- Clade: Angiosperms
- Clade: Magnoliids
- Order: Magnoliales
- Family: Annonaceae
- Genus: Goniothalamus
- Species: G. ridleyi

Binomial name
- Goniothalamus ridleyi King

Synonyms
- Goniothalamus fasciculatus Boerl.; Goniothalamus lateritius Becc.; Goniothalamus prainianus King; Goniothalamus prainianus var. angustipetalus King; Goniothalamus ridleyi var. fasciculatus (Boerl.) Bân

= Goniothalamus ridleyi =

Species of plant

Goniothalamus ridleyi is a species of plant in the family Annonaceae. It is native to Borneo, Peninsular Malaysia, Sumatra and Thailand. George King, who first formally described the species, named it after the English botanist Henry Nicholas Ridley who collected the specimen King examined.

== Description ==
It is a tree reaching 23 meters in height. Its papery to membranous, elliptical leaves are 14-29 by 3.5-11.4 centimeter, have short tapering tips and bases that come to a point where they meet the petioles. The dull upper surfaces of the leaves are hairless except the midribs which have fine hairs. The shiny lower surfaces are hairless except the midribs which have fine hairs. The leaves have about 6-19 pairs of secondary veins that emanate from their midribs that curve near the leaf margin. Its petioles are 6-16 by 1-3 millimeters and either hairless or sparse with fine hairs. Its flowers occur in crowded clusters on long pedicels that extend from warty outgrowths, or tubercle, that grow from the base of the trunk close to soil level. The tubercles are woody and covered in fine hairs. The sparsely hairy pedicels are 1.5-11 centimeters by 1.2-1.9 millimeters and have 3-10 small bracts. Its purple to brown, leathery, oval to triangular sepals are 9–1.35 by 6-9 millimeters, sparsely covered in fine hairs, with bluntly pointed tips. The sepals are fused at their base. Its flowers have 6 petals in two rows of 3. The cream-colored to pale brown, leathery, oblong to oval outer petals are 1.2-5 by 0.9-2 centimeters, have broad thick claws, come to shallow point at their tips. The out petals are covered in wooly hairs on their inner surface and sparse to dense fine hairs on their outer surface. The cream-colored to pale brown, leathery, teardrop-shaped inner leaves are 1.1-1.7 by 0.7-0.95 centimeters, taper to a short slender point at their tips, and have claws that are 1.5-2.4 millimeters wide. The inner leaves densely hairy on their outer surface and velvety on their inner surface. Its flowers have 120-300 stamen that are 1.5-3.4 by 0.2-0.4 millimeters. Its flowers have 34-90 carpels with hairless 0.9–2.3 by 0.2–0.5 millimeter ovaries. The stigma and style are 1-2 by 0.1-0.3 millimeters long and hairless or sparse with fine hairs. Its fruit are born on pedicels that are 3-13 centimeters by 2-5 millimeters. Its smooth, matt, hairless, round to oval, fruit are 1.6-3.5 by 1.3-2.9 centimeters and tapered. The fruit vary in color including yellow, pink, purple and red to brown. Each fruit is attached to the pedicel by a 2-15 by 1.5-3 millimeter stipe. The fruit have 1-3 flattened, elliptical seeds that are 1.5-2.5 by 1-1.8 centimeters. The brown seeds are smooth and sparse tufts of white or gold-colored hairs.

=== Reproductive biology ===
The pollen of G. ridleyi is shed as permanent tetrads.

== Habitat and distribution ==
It has been observed growing in swamp forests, lowland forests and montane forests, on hillside or by streams, at elevations of 50 to 1000 meters.
