= Goniothalamus chinensis =

Conservation status
- Least Concern (IUCN 2.3)

Scientific classification
- Kingdom: Plantae
- Clade: Embryophytes
- Clade: Tracheophytes
- Clade: Spermatophytes
- Clade: Angiosperms
- Clade: Magnoliids
- Order: Magnoliales
- Family: Annonaceae
- Genus: Goniothalamus
- Species: G. chinensis

Binomial name
- Goniothalamus chinensis Merr. & Chun

Species of tree

Goniothalamus chinensis is a species of flowering plant in the Annonaceae family. It is a shrub or tree native to southern China (southern Guangxi and Hainan) and Vietnam.
