= Goniothalamus latestigma =

Scientific classification
- Kingdom: Plantae
- Clade: Tracheophytes
- Clade: Angiosperms
- Clade: Magnoliids
- Order: Magnoliales
- Family: Annonaceae
- Genus: Goniothalamus
- Species: G. latestigma

Binomial name
- Goniothalamus latestigma C.E.C.Fisch.

Species of plant

Goniothalamus latestigma is a species of plant in the family Annonaceae. It is native to Myanmar and Thailand. Cecil Ernest Claude Fischer, the botanist who first formally described the species, named it after its broad (latus in Latin) stigmas.

== Description ==
It is a bush reaching 2.4–3 meters in height. Its membranous, oblong leaves are 14–27 by 4–8 centimeters, and come to an abrupt point at their tip. The leaves are hairless on their upper surface and lightly hairy on their underside. The leaves have minute translucent speckles and their margins are slightly wavy. Its leaves have 10–13 pairs of veins emanating from midribs. Its 0.7–1 centimeter long petioles are covered in minute fine hairs and have a channel in their upper surface. Its solitary flowers are on 6 millimeters long pedicels that grow in axillary positions. The pedicels are covered in fine hairs and have two narrow oblong bracts that are also 6 millimeters long. It has 3 oval sepals that are 1 - 1.5 centimeters long and come to a short tapering point at their tip. The sepals are dotted with glands and are hairless on their inner surface but covered in rust colored hairs on their outer surface. Its flowers have 6 fleshy, yellow-green petals in two rows of three. Its narrow oblong outer petals are 2.5–3.5 centimeters long and come to a point at their tips. The outer petals are wrinkled and covered in dense rust colored hair. Its oval inner petals are 1-1.5 centimeters long and come to a point at their tips. The margins of the inner petals are joined. The base of the inner petals is concave while the apical half is thickened. The outer surface of the inner petals is covered in dense reddish-brown hairs, while the inner surface is covered in fine gray hairs except on the concave base. It has numerous stamen that are 1.5 millimeters long. The anthers are obscured by a hemispherical overgrowth of connective tissue covered in dense dark hairs. It has numerous carpels with 1.5–2 millimeter long ovaries covered in sparse reddish-brown hairs. Its carpels have very short styles, with outward curving, funnel-shaped sigmas that as long or longer than the ovaries. The stigmas are split on one side, hairless and lobed at their apex.

=== Reproductive biology ===
The pollen of G. latestigma is shed as permanent tetrads.

== Habitat and distribution ==
It has been observed growing at sea-level altitude.
