= Goniothalamus maewongensis =

Conservation status
- Vulnerable (IUCN 3.1)

Scientific classification
- Kingdom: Plantae
- Clade: Embryophytes
- Clade: Tracheophytes
- Clade: Spermatophytes
- Clade: Angiosperms
- Clade: Magnoliids
- Order: Magnoliales
- Family: Annonaceae
- Genus: Goniothalamus
- Species: G. maewongensis

Binomial name
- Goniothalamus maewongensis R.M.K.Saunders & Chalermglin

Species of plant

Goniothalamus maewongensis is a species of flowering plant in the family Annonaceae. It is a tree native to northern Thailand. Richard M.K. Saunders and Piya Chalermglin, who first formally described the species, named it after the Mae Wong National Park in Thailand where the type specimen was collected.

== Description ==
It is a tree reaching 8 meters in height. Its oblong, papery leaves are 19.5-25.5 by 5-7 centimeters with tips that taper to a point and wedge-shaped or pointed bases. Its leaves have smooth upper sides and lightly hairy undersides. The leaves have 13-15 pairs of secondary veins emanating from their midribs. Its petioles are 7-14 by 1.7-2.4 millimeters and hairless or sparsely hairy. Its solitary flowers are axillary and droop downwards. Its flowers are on densely hairy pedicels that are 12-14 by 1.7-2 millimeter. The pedicels have up to 5 bracts. It has 3 light-yellow, oval to triangular sepals, 5 by 5 millimeters, with smooth inner surfaces and lightly hairy outer surfaces. The margins of the sepals are fuse at their base, and they curve back on themselves when mature. It has 6 petals in two rows of three. Its 3 light-yellow, oval shaped outer petals are 19 by 15 millimeters, and densely hairy on both surfaces. Its inner petals are 9-13 by 6.5-7 millimeters, densely hairy on both surfaces and yellow with pink highlights. Its flowers have up to 200 stamens that are 2.3-2.5 by 0.6-0.7 millimeters. Its flowers have up to 20 carpels with ovaries that are 2.7-2.9 by 0.3-.05 millimeters. The ovaries are bald, with the exception of a line of gold-colored hairs. The stigma and hairless style together are 3.2-3.6 millimeters long. The stigma are spindle-shaped, hairless and have warty appearance. Clusters of fruit are born on 10-18 by 2.7-2.8 millimeters hairy pedicels. The round to elliptical, green-colored fruit are 21-35 by 16-26 millimeters with smooth or slightly wrinkly surfaces. Each fruit is attached by a 1 by 2.3 millimeter hairless stipe. Each fruit has 1-4 elliptical, wrinkly, brown seeds that are 18-21 by 18-19 millimeters and sparsely covered in hairs.

=== Reproductive biology ===
The pollen of G. maewongensis is shed as permanent tetrads.

== Habitat and distribution ==
It has been observed growing in mountainous rainforests at elevations of 1300 meters.

== Uses ==
Bioactive molecules extracted from its bark and leaves have been reported to have cytotoxic activity in tests with cultured human cancer cells.
