= Goniothalamus velutinus =

Conservation status
- Least Concern (IUCN 3.1)

Scientific classification
- Kingdom: Plantae
- Clade: Embryophytes
- Clade: Tracheophytes
- Clade: Spermatophytes
- Clade: Angiosperms
- Clade: Magnoliids
- Order: Magnoliales
- Family: Annonaceae
- Genus: Goniothalamus
- Species: G. velutinus

Binomial name
- Goniothalamus velutinus Airy Shaw

Species of plant in the soursop family

Goniothalamus velutinus is a species of flowering plant in the family Annonaceae. It is a shrub or tree endemic to northern and northwestern Borneo. Herbert Airy Shaw, the English botanist who first formally described the species, named it after the dense velvety (velutinus in Latin) hair on its branchlets and petioles.

== Description ==
It is a tree reaching 6 meters (20 ft) in height. Its smooth, dark grey to black, young branches are covered in dense, rust-colored, velvety hairs. Its cylindrical petioles are 1.3–2.2 by 0.5–0.8 centimeters and covered in dense, rust-colored, velvety hairs. Its papery to leathery, oblong to lance-shaped leaves are 24–60 by 6.5–12.5 centimeters (9.4–23.6 by 2.6–4.9 in) with rounded apices that end in an abrupt, tapering tip and pointed bases. The leaves have margins that are curved toward underside with upper surfaces that are brown to green and covered in fine hairs, and lower surfaces that are green to brown and covered in dense, matted, woolly hairs. The leaf midribs are sunken, grooved and covered with hair on the upper surface; raised and covered in dense, matted, velvety to wooly hairs beneath. The leaves have 22–25 pairs of secondary veins emanating from their midribs. Its green flowers have 6 petals arranged in two rows of three. The flowers are born on pedicels that are 5-9 millimeters long. The pedicels have up to 4 bracts that are 2–4 millimeters long at their base. Its triangular to oval sepals are 7 by 4 millimeters with pointed tips. The sepals are fused over a short portion of their base. The oval to lance-shaped outer petals are 10–14 by 4–6 millimeters with pointed to tapering tips and rounded bases. A portion of the inner surface of the outer petals is covered in dense, matted, woolly hairs. The oval inner petals are 5–10 by 2–4 millimeters. The basal 4 millimeters of the inner petals are wedge-shaped, and their tips are tightly fused. The margins of the inner petals are curved back and covered in dense, woolly hairs. Its flowers have approximately 140 oblong to wedge-shaped stamen that are 2 millimeters long. The connective tissue between the lobes of the anther forms a hemispherical cap that is covered in dense, minute hairs. Its flowers have 12–16 oval to spindle-shaped carpels that are 2 millimeters long with negligible styles. The bases of the carpels are covered in long rust-colored hairs. Its stigmas are small and minutely bilobed.

=== Reproductive biology ===
The pollen of G. velutinus is shed as permanent tetrads.

== Habitat and distribution ==
It has been observed growing in peat swamps and by streams in primary forests at elevations below 300 meters (980 ft).

== Uses ==
Bioactive compounds extracted from its bark have been reported to have antioxidant activities using in vitro tests, anti-biofilm activity in tests with Streptococcus mutans and Proteus mirabilis, and cytostatic activity in tests with cultured human cancer cells.
