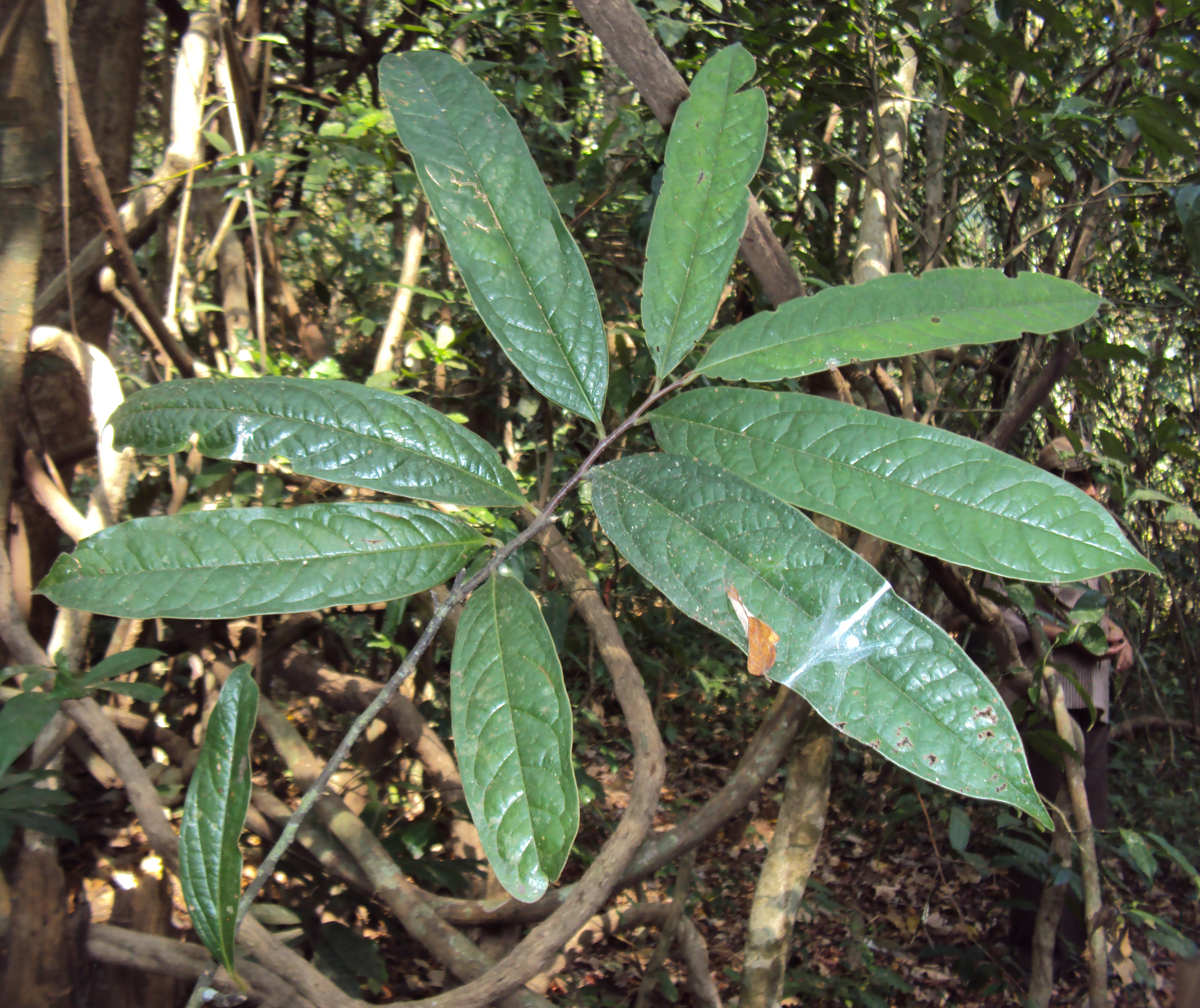

Conservation status
- Near Threatened (IUCN 3.1)

Scientific classification
- Kingdom: Plantae
- Clade: Embryophytes
- Clade: Tracheophytes
- Clade: Spermatophytes
- Clade: Angiosperms
- Clade: Magnoliids
- Order: Magnoliales
- Family: Annonaceae
- Genus: Goniothalamus
- Species: G. wynaadensis

Binomial name
- Goniothalamus wynaadensis Bedd.

= Goniothalamus wynaadensis =

Species of flowering plant

Goniothalamus wynaadensis is a species of plant in the Annonaceae family. It is endemic to the Western Ghats of southern India.

Goniothalamus wynaadensis is a small tree, growing 3 to 5 meters tall.

It is known from 11 locations, 10 of which are in the Wayanad region of Kerala, and one is further south in Anamalai. The species' estimated extent of occurrence (EOO) is 6,261 km^{2}, and its area of occupancy (AOO) is 40 km^{2}.

It grows in the understorey of lowland evergreen rain forest, up to 900 metres elevation.

It is threatened with habitat loss and fragmentation from conversion of its native forest habitat to agriculture and plantations. It is assessed as Near Threatened.
