= Goniothalamus gardneri =

Conservation status
- Vulnerable (IUCN 3.1)

Scientific classification
- Kingdom: Plantae
- Clade: Embryophytes
- Clade: Tracheophytes
- Clade: Spermatophytes
- Clade: Angiosperms
- Clade: Magnoliids
- Order: Magnoliales
- Family: Annonaceae
- Genus: Goniothalamus
- Species: G. gardneri

Binomial name
- Goniothalamus gardneri Hook.f. & Thomson

Synonyms
- Goniothalamus walkeri Hook.f. & Thomson; Oxymitra gardneri (Hook.f. & Thomson) Baill.

Species of flowering plant

Goniothalamus gardneri is a species of flowering plant in the Annonaceae family. It is a shrub or tree endemic to Sri Lanka.

== Culture ==
Known as ක‍ටු කෙර (katu kera) in Sinhala.
