= Nguyên Tiên Bân =

Vietnamese botanist

- Born: 1939 (age 86–87)
- Scientific career
- Fields: Botany
- Author abbrev. (botany): Ban

Nguyên Tiên Bân (born 1939) was a Vietnamese botanist, who worked principally at the Institute of Ecology and Biological Resources in the Vietnam Academy of Science and Technology.

== Life ==
Bân was a Professor and served as the Head of the Botany Department at the Institute of Ecology and Biological Resources in Hanoi. He worked primarily on Annonaceae and Magnoliaceae.

== Legacy ==
He is the authority for at least 97 taxa including: IPNI. List of plant names with authority Bân .
