= Achille Eugène Finet =

French botanist (1863–1913)

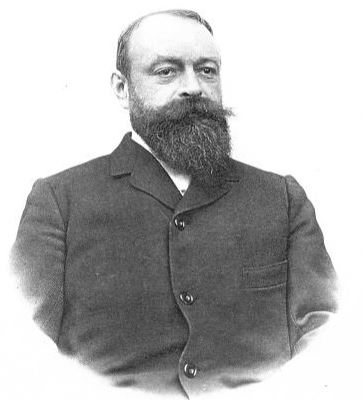
Achille Eugène Finet

Achille Eugène Finet (1863, Argenteuil – 1913, París) was a French botanist best known for his study of orchids native to Japan and China.

Within the family Orchidaceae, he was the taxonomic authority of the genera Arethusantha, Hemihabenaria, Monixus and Pseudoliparis as well as of numerous orchid species. With François Gagnepain, he circumscribed a number of plant species from the family Annonaceae.

In 1925 Hu Xiansu named the orchid genus Neofinetia in his honor.

== Selected works ==
- Orchidées nouvelles de la Chine, 1897 - New orchids native to China.
- Sur le genre Oreorchis Lindley, 1897 - On the genus Oreorchis Lindl..
- Orchidées recueillies au Yunnan et au Laos, 1898 - Orchids collected in Yunnan and Laos.
- Les orchidées du Japon, principalement d'après les collections de l'herbier du Muséum d'histoire naturelle de Paris, 1900 - Orchids of Japan, principally from herbarium collections at the Muséum d'histoire naturelle in Paris.
- Les orchidées de l'Asie orientale, 1901 - Orchids of eastern Asia.
- Contributions à la flore de l'Asie orientale, 1907 (with François Gagnepain) - Contributions to the flora of eastern Asia.
