= List of Saurauia species =

Saurauia is a large genus of flowering plants in the family Actinidiaceae. As of October 2025, there are around 400 accepted species.

== A-B ==
- Saurauia abbreviata Mazo
- Saurauia actinidiifolia Stapf
- Saurauia aculeata Lauterb.
- Saurauia acuminata Merr.
- Saurauia adenodonta Sleumer
- Saurauia aequatoriensis Sprague
- Saurauia aesculifolia de Vriese
- Saurauia agamae Merr.
- Saurauia aguaricana Soejarto
- Saurauia albiflora A.C.Sm.
- Saurauia alkmaarensis Lauterb.
- Saurauia alloplectifolia Soejarto
- Saurauia alpicola A.C.Sm.
- Saurauia altissima Zipp. ex Miq.
- Saurauia altiterra P.Royen
- Saurauia alvarezii Merr.
- Saurauia amdjahii K.M.Wong
- Saurauia amoena Stapf
- Saurauia ampla Merr.
- Saurauia amplifolia Diels
- Saurauia andreana Oliv. ex F.Muell.
- Saurauia angica Kaneh. & Hatus.
- Saurauia angustifolia Turcz.
- Saurauia angustipetala K.M.Wong
- Saurauia arcana A.C.Sm.
- Saurauia archboldiana A.C.Sm.
- Saurauia armata Kurz
- Saurauia arnoldii Sleumer
- Saurauia aromatica R.E.Schult.
- Saurauia ashtonii K.M.Wong
- Saurauia aspera Turcz.
- Saurauia asperifolia Stapf ex Baker f.
- Saurauia aurea Kamariah ex K.M.Wong
- Saurauia auricoma Ridl.
- Saurauia avellana Elmer
- Saurauia bakaraya Kamariah ex K.M.Wong
- Saurauia bakeri Merr.
- Saurauia barbata Kamariah ex K.M.Wong
- Saurauia belensis A.C.Sm.
- Saurauia beluranensis K.M.Wong
- Saurauia bentuangensis K.M.Wong
- Saurauia bibracteata Lauterb.
- Saurauia bicolor Merr.
- Saurauia bifida Warb.
- Saurauia biserrata (Ruiz & Pav.) Spreng.
- Saurauia blumiana Benn.
- Saurauia bogoriensis Hoogland
- Saurauia bontocensis Merr.
- Saurauia borneensis Merr.
- Saurauia bosuangii Kamariah ex K.M.Wong
- Saurauia brachybotrys Turcz.
- Saurauia bracteolata DC.
- Saurauia bracteosa DC.
- Saurauia brassii Diels
- Saurauia brevicymula K.M.Wong
- Saurauia brevirostris Zipp. ex Miq.
- Saurauia briquetii Buscal.
- Saurauia bruneiensis Kamariah
- Saurauia bullosa Wawra

== C-E ==
- Saurauia calcicola K.M.Wong
- Saurauia callithrix Miq.
- Saurauia calyptrata Lauterb.
- Saurauia capitellata Kamariah ex K.M.Wong
- Saurauia capitulata A.C.Sm.
- Saurauia caquetensis R.E.Schult.
- Saurauia castanifolia Ridl.
- Saurauia cauliflora DC.
- Saurauia ceramica Miq.
- Saurauia chaiana K.M.Wong
- Saurauia chaparensis Soejarto
- Saurauia chewlunii K.M.Wong
- Saurauia chiliantha R.E.Schult.
- Saurauia chocoensis Soejarto
- Saurauia choriophylla R.E.Schult. & G.Gut.
- Saurauia cinnamomea Merr.
- Saurauia clementis Merr.
- Saurauia collina A.C.Sm.
- Saurauia comitis-rossei R.E.Schult.
- Saurauia conferta Warb.
- Saurauia confusa Merr.
- Saurauia congestiflora A.C.Sm.
- Saurauia conniechaniae K.M.Wong
- Saurauia conzattii Buscal.
- Saurauia copelandii Elmer
- Saurauia cordata Quisumb.
- Saurauia corneri Kamariah ex K.M.Wong
- Saurauia costata Reinw. ex de Vriese
- Saurauia crassisepala Soejarto
- Saurauia crenulata DC.
- Saurauia crockerensis K.M.Wong
- Saurauia cuatrecasasiana R.E.Schult.
- Saurauia cuchumatanensis Standl. & Steyerm.
- Saurauia cuspidella Miq.
- Saurauia darikalteng K.M.Wong
- Saurauia dasyantha de Vriese
- Saurauia decolorata Olimpos & Penneys
- Saurauia decurrens Lauterb.
- Saurauia dempoensis Baker f.
- Saurauia denticulata C.B.Rob.
- Saurauia dewildeorum K.M.Wong
- Saurauia dicalyx Miq.
- Saurauia dielsiana A.C.Sm.
- Saurauia distasosa Korth.
- Saurauia diwolii K.M.Wong
- Saurauia dufaurii (F.Muell.) Diels
- Saurauia eburnea A.C.Sm.
- Saurauia elegans (Choisy) Fern.-Vill.
- Saurauia elmeri Merr.
- Saurauia emarginata C.T.White & W.D.Francis
- Saurauia erythrocarpa C.F.Liang & Y.S.Wang
- Saurauia erythrothrica Elmer
- Saurauia euryolepis de Vriese
- Saurauia excavata Korth.
- Saurauia excelsa Willd.
- Saurauia excurrens A.C.Sm.
- Saurauia eximia Ridl.

== F-K ==
- Saurauia fasciculata Wall.
- Saurauia fasciculiflora Merr.
- Saurauia ferox Korth.
- Saurauia fimbriata A.C.Sm.
- Saurauia floccifera Triana & Planch.
- Saurauia forbesii Baker f.
- Saurauia formosa Sleumer
- Saurauia fragrans Hoogland
- Saurauia fraseri Ridl.
- Saurauia geensinkii K.M.Wong
- Saurauia gigantea DC.
- Saurauia gigantifolia Quisumb.
- Saurauia giluwensis P.Royen
- Saurauia gjellerupii Lauterb.
- Saurauia glabra Merr.
- Saurauia glabrifolia Merr.
- Saurauia gorokae Gilli
- Saurauia graciliflora Kamariah ex K.M.Wong
- Saurauia gracilipes Merr.
- Saurauia grandifolia Zoll. & Moritzi
- Saurauia griffithii Dyer
- Saurauia hageniana Gilli
- Saurauia harlingii Soejarto
- Saurauia hasskarliana Miq.
- Saurauia herthae Sleumer
- Saurauia hiranohottae K.M.Wong
- Saurauia hirsuta Blume
- Saurauia hispidicalyx Kamariah ex K.M.Wong
- Saurauia hoeveniana Koord.
- Saurauia homotricha A.Pool
- Saurauia horrida Hook.f.
- Saurauia hosei Merr.
- Saurauia hystrix Ridl.
- Saurauia idenburgensis A.C.Sm.
- Saurauia iliasii K.M.Wong
- Saurauia ilicifolia P.Royen
- Saurauia involucrata Merr.
- Saurauia isosepala Kamariah ex K.M.Wong
- Saurauia isoxanthotricha Buscal.
- Saurauia jaswirii K.M.Wong
- Saurauia javanica (Blume ex Nees) Hoogland
- Saurauia jeisinii K.M.Wong
- Saurauia jiewhoei K.M.Wong
- Saurauia joelii K.M.Wong
- Saurauia jugahii K.M.Wong
- Saurauia juliae K.M.Wong
- Saurauia junghuhnii Choisy
- Saurauia kajewskii A.C.Sm.
- Saurauia kegeliana Schltdl.
- Saurauia kessleri K.M.Wong
- Saurauia kinabaluensis Merr.
- Saurauia klemmei Merr.
- Saurauia klinkii K.Schum. & Lauterb.
- Saurauia knemifolia Quisumb.
- Saurauia kuchingensis K.M.Wong
- Saurauia kuswatae K.M.Wong

== L-N ==
- Saurauia lactea Lauterb.
- Saurauia laevigata Triana & Planch.
- Saurauia lanceolata DC.
- Saurauia latibractea Choisy
- Saurauia latifolia K.M.Wong
- Saurauia laxiflora Soejarto
- Saurauia leeana K.M.Wong
- Saurauia lehmannii Hieron.
- Saurauia leopoldii K.M.Wong
- Saurauia lepidicalyx Miq.
- Saurauia lepidota Kamariah
- Saurauia leprosa Korth.
- Saurauia leucocarpa Schltdl.
- Saurauia leytensis Merr.
- Saurauia linusii K.M.Wong
- Saurauia loeseneriana Buscal.
- Saurauia longipetiolata Merr.
- Saurauia longistyla Merr.
- Saurauia lorentzii Lauterb.
- Saurauia luzoniensis Merr.
- Saurauia macgregorii Merr.
- Saurauia macrantha A.C.Sm.
- Saurauia macrophylla Lem.
- Saurauia macrotricha Kurz
- Saurauia madrensis B.T.Keller & Breedlove
- Saurauia magentea Danet
- Saurauia magnifica Soejarto
- Saurauia mahmudii Hoogland
- Saurauia malayana Hoogland
- Saurauia matudae Lundell
- Saurauia meridensis Steyerm.
- Saurauia merrillii Elmer
- Saurauia mexiae Killip ex Soejarto
- Saurauia micayensis Killip
- Saurauia micrantha Blume
- Saurauia microphylla de Vriese
- Saurauia minahassae Koord.
- Saurauia miniata C.F.Liang & Y.S.Wang
- Saurauia minutiflora K.M.Wong
- Saurauia molinae Soejarto
- Saurauia mollis Hassk.
- Saurauia mollissima Ridl.
- Saurauia momiensis Kaneh. & Hatus.
- Saurauia monadelpha Scheff.
- Saurauia montana Seem.
- Saurauia montifragrans K.M.Wong
- Saurauia multinervis Soejarto
- Saurauia muricata Reinw. ex de Vriese
- Saurauia myrmecoidea Merr.
- Saurauia nabirensis Kaneh. & Hatus.
- Saurauia napaulensis DC.
- Saurauia natalicia Sleumer
- Saurauia negrosensis Elmer
- Saurauia nicobarica T.K.Paul
- Saurauia nigrescens Korth.
- Saurauia njapaensis K.M.Wong
- Saurauia nooteboomii K.M.Wong
- Saurauia novoguineensis Scheff.
- Saurauia nudiflora DC.
- Saurauia nutans Gilli

== O-P ==
- Saurauia oblanceolata Ridl.
- Saurauia oblancifolia Merr.
- Saurauia oblancilimba Quisumb.
- Saurauia obvallatoides Kaneh. & Hatus.
- Saurauia occulta A.C.Sm.
- Saurauia oligantha Merr.
- Saurauia oligolepis Miq.
- Saurauia oligophlebia Merr.
- Saurauia omichlophila R.E.Schult.
- Saurauia oreophila Hemsl.
- Saurauia oroquensis Soejarto
- Saurauia othmanii K.M.Wong
- Saurauia pachyphylla K.M.Wong
- Saurauia palawanensis Merr.
- Saurauia panayensis Merr.
- Saurauia panduriformis Elmer
- Saurauia paniculigera Ridl.
- Saurauia papillulosa Merr.
- Saurauia parasnathensis Ranjan & S.K.Srivast.
- Saurauia parviflora Triana & Planch.
- Saurauia pavonii K.M.Wong
- Saurauia peduncularis Triana & Planch.
- Saurauia pedunculata Hook.
- Saurauia pendula Blume
- Saurauia pentapetala (Jack) Hoogland
- Saurauia pereirae K.M.Wong
- Saurauia peruviana Buscal.
- Saurauia petelotii Merr.
- Saurauia philippinensis Merr.
- Saurauia pittieri Donn.Sm.
- Saurauia planchonii Hook.f.
- Saurauia platyphylla Merr.
- Saurauia pleurotricha Diels
- Saurauia plurilocularis C.T.White & W.D.Francis
- Saurauia polyneura C.F.Liang & Y.S.Wang
- Saurauia polyodon Miq.
- Saurauia polysperma (Blanco) Merr.
- Saurauia poolei C.T.White & W.D.Francis
- Saurauia portachuelensis R.E.Schult.
- Saurauia postarii K.M.Wong
- Saurauia prainiana Buscal.
- Saurauia pringlei Rose
- Saurauia pseudoleucocarpa Buscal.
- Saurauia pseudostrigillosa Buscal.
- Saurauia pubescens K.Koch & Linden
- Saurauia pulchra Sprague
- Saurauia punctata Stapf ex Baker f.
- Saurauia punduana Wall.
- Saurauia purgans B.L.Burtt
- Saurauia purpurellifolia Kaneh. & Hatus.
- Saurauia pustulata G.E.Hunter
- Saurauia putumayonis R.E.Schult. & García-Barr.

== R-S ==
- Saurauia radlkoferi Buscal.
- Saurauia raimondiana Sleumer
- Saurauia ramiflora Koord. & Valeton
- Saurauia rantaijawae K.M.Wong
- Saurauia reinwardtiana Blume
- Saurauia rhodosma Sleumer
- Saurauia ridleyi Merr.
- Saurauia rodatzii K.Schum. & Lauterb.
- Saurauia roemeri Lauterb.
- Saurauia rosea Jungh.
- Saurauia roxburghii Wall.
- Saurauia rubens Ridl.
- Saurauia rubicunda (A.Gray) Seem.
- Saurauia rubiformis Vatke
- Saurauia rubiginosa (Jack) Merr.
- Saurauia rubricalyx C.F.Liang & Y.S.Wang
- Saurauia rubrisepala Soejarto
- Saurauia rubrisquamata A.C.Sm.
- Saurauia rufa Burkill
- Saurauia rufescens B.J.Conn & Damas
- Saurauia rufinervis Kaneh. & Hatus.
- Saurauia runiae K.M.Wong
- Saurauia rusbyi Britton
- Saurauia sakoembangensis Korth.
- Saurauia samarensis Merr.
- Saurauia sammanniana K.M.Wong
- Saurauia sampad Elmer
- Saurauia sapotoides Ridl.
- Saurauia scaberrima Lauterb.
- Saurauia scabra (Kunth) D.Dietr.
- Saurauia scabrida Hemsl.
- Saurauia schmutzii Hoogland
- Saurauia schultesiana Soejarto
- Saurauia schultzeorum Sleumer
- Saurauia schumanniana Diels
- Saurauia schwazii Koord.
- Saurauia seibertii Standl.
- Saurauia selerorum Buscal.
- Saurauia serpentina Kamariah ex K.M.Wong
- Saurauia serrata DC.
- Saurauia setigera Korth.
- Saurauia sibuyanensis Elmer
- Saurauia sidiyasae K.M.Wong
- Saurauia simplex Merr.
- Saurauia singalangensis Korth.
- Saurauia sinohirsuta J.Q.Li & Soejarto
- Saurauia siporensis Ridl.
- Saurauia solitaria Sleumer
- Saurauia sorsogonensis Merr.
- Saurauia sparsiflora Elmer
- Saurauia speciosa Kamariah ex K.M.Wong
- Saurauia spectabilis Hook.
- Saurauia spinosa M.Briggs
- Saurauia spinuligera R.E.Schult.
- Saurauia squamellicaula Miq.
- Saurauia squamifructa G.E.Hunter
- Saurauia squamulosa Koord. & Valeton
- Saurauia stapfiana Buscal.
- Saurauia striata Soejarto
- Saurauia strigillosa Triana & Planch.
- Saurauia strigosa Kamariah ex K.M.Wong
- Saurauia subcordata Korth.
- Saurauia subnuda K.M.Wong
- Saurauia subsessilifolia Kamariah ex K.M.Wong
- Saurauia subspinosa J.Anthony
- Saurauia sugaui K.M.Wong
- Saurauia sumatrana Baker f.
- Saurauia suzanae K.M.Wong

== T-Z ==
- Saurauia tafana A.C.Sm.
- Saurauia tambensis Killip
- Saurauia tayabensis Quisumb.
- Saurauia taylorii W.N.Takeuchi
- Saurauia temburongensis K.M.Wong
- Saurauia tenuicyma K.M.Wong
- Saurauia tewensis Korth.
- Saurauia thorelii Finet & Gagnep.
- Saurauia thyrsiflora C.F.Liang & Y.S.Wang
- Saurauia tomentocalyx Kamariah ex K.M.Wong
- Saurauia tomentosa (Kunth) Spreng.
- Saurauia trichocalyx Koord. & Valeton
- Saurauia trichophora Quisumb.
- Saurauia trichopoda Baker f.
- Saurauia tristyla DC.
- Saurauia trugul P.Royen
- Saurauia trunciflora Merr.
- Saurauia ubaldusii Kamariah ex K.M.Wong
- Saurauia umbellata Koord. & Valeton
- Saurauia uniflora Ridl.
- Saurauia urdanetensis Elmer
- Saurauia urophylla K.M.Wong
- Saurauia ursina Triana & Planch.
- Saurauia vallium C.T.White & W.D.Francis
- Saurauia vanoverberghii Merr.
- Saurauia verheijenii Hoogland
- Saurauia versteegii Gilg & Lauterb.
- Saurauia villosa DC.
- Saurauia vulcani Korth.
- Saurauia waldheimii Buscal.
- Saurauia warburgii Koord.
- Saurauia warenensis Kaneh. & Hatus.
- Saurauia waworoentii Koord.
- Saurauia wenzelii Merr.
- Saurauia whitfordii Merr.
- Saurauia wigmanii Koord.
- Saurauia winkleri Merr.
- Saurauia xylantha Stapf ex Baker f.
- Saurauia yasicae Loes.
- Saurauia yunnanensis C.F.Liang & Y.S.Wang
- Saurauia zahlbruckneri Buscal.
