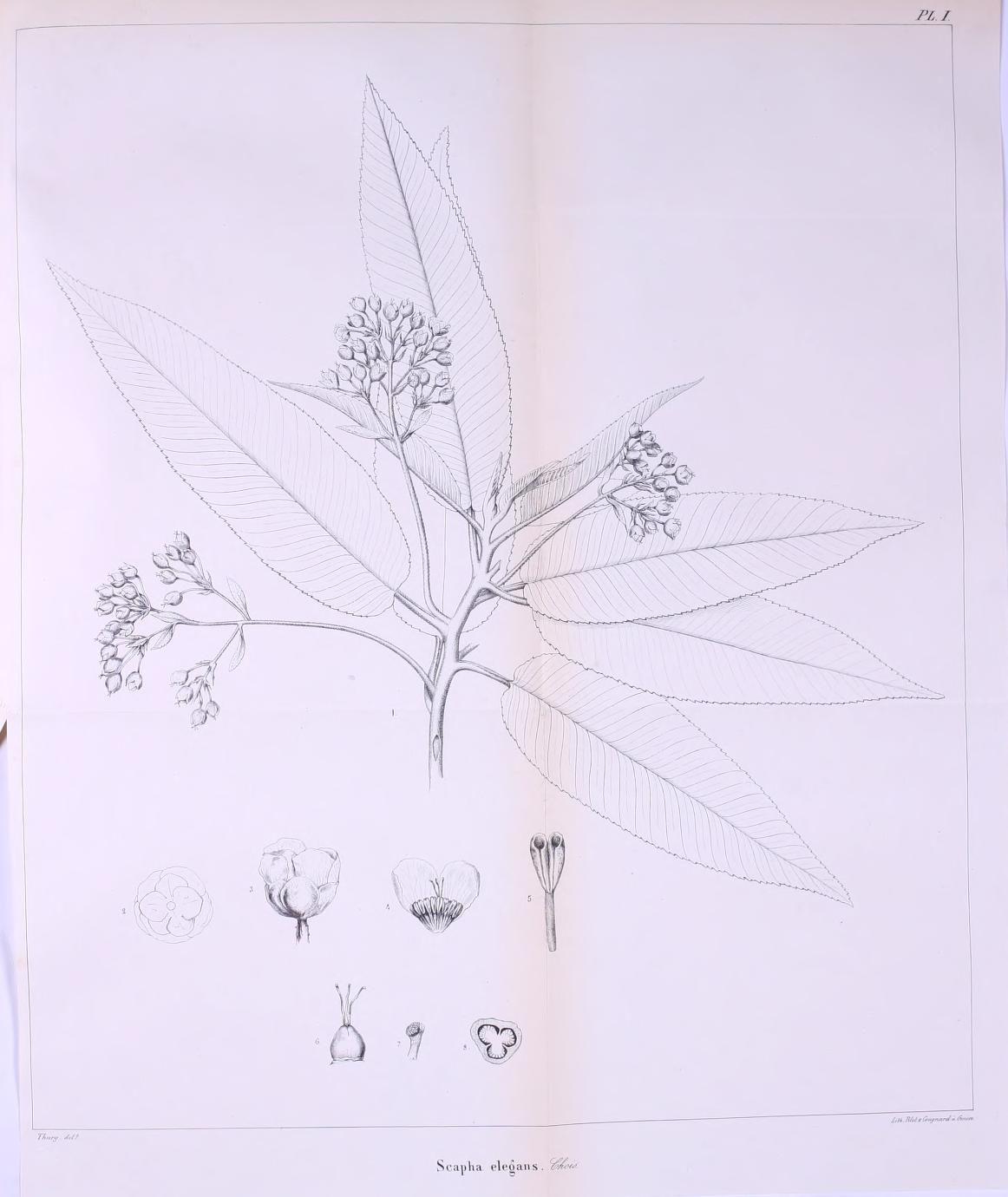
- Botanical illustration of Saurauia elegans (using the basionym "Scapha elegans")

Conservation status
- Least Concern (IUCN 3.1)

Scientific classification
- Kingdom: Plantae
- Clade: Tracheophytes
- Clade: Angiosperms
- Clade: Eudicots
- Clade: Asterids
- Order: Ericales
- Family: Actinidiaceae
- Genus: Saurauia
- Species: S. elegans

Binomial name
- Saurauia elegans (Choisy) Fern.-Vill.

Synonyms
- Saurauia rugosa Turcz. Saurauia santosii Merr. Scapha elegans Choisy

= Saurauia elegans =

Species of flowering plant

Saurauia elegans is a species of plant in the family Actinidiaceae. It is native to the Philippines. In the Philippines it is commonly called uyok and is used as a traditional medicine for lung ailments and also to decorate food dishes.

== Description ==
It is a tree reaching 20 feet (6.1 m) in height. Its twigs are covered in rough hairs. Its leaves are 10.2–12.7 cm (4.0–5.0 in) long, 2.7–3.4 cm (1.1–1.3 in) wide at their base and come to a point at their tip. Its petioles are 0.5 inches long. Its flowers are axillary. Its oval-shaped sepals are 3.4 millimeters long. Its corolla are 6.8 millimeters long. It has numerous stamens and 3 styles. Its seeds are wrinkled and angular.

=== Reproductive biology ===
The pollen of S. elegans is shed as permanent tetrads.
