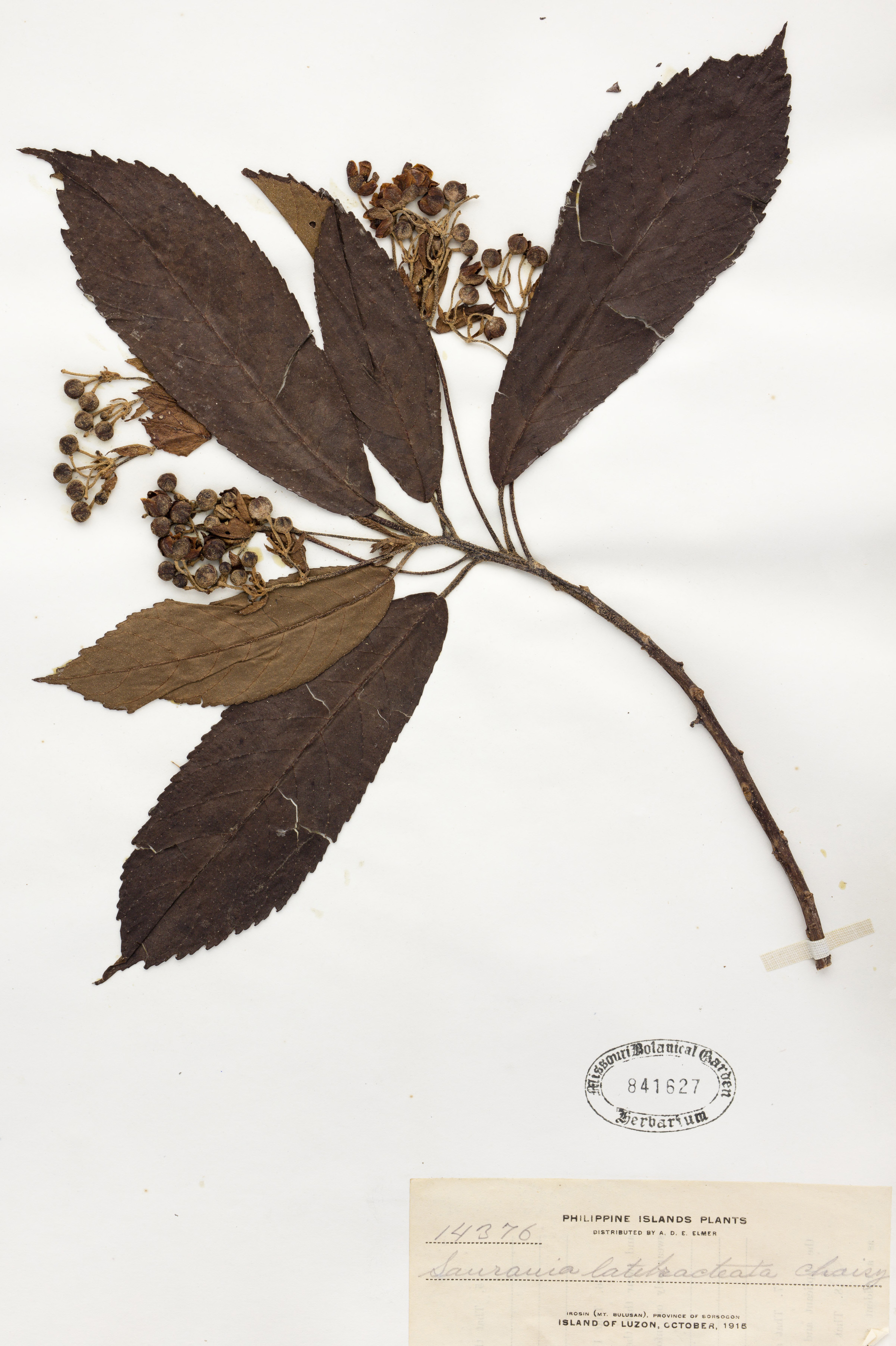
- Herbarium specimen of Saurauia latibractea.

Scientific classification
- Kingdom: Plantae
- Clade: Embryophytes
- Clade: Tracheophytes
- Clade: Angiosperms
- Clade: Eudicots
- Clade: Asterids
- Order: Ericales
- Family: Actinidiaceae
- Genus: Saurauia
- Species: S. latibractea

Binomial name
- Saurauia latibractea Choisy

Synonyms
- Saurauia cumingiana de Vriese; Saurauia exasperata de Vriese; Scapha ramosii Quisumb.

= Saurauia latibractea =

Species of flowering plant

Saurauia latibractea is a species of plant in the family Actindiaceae. It is native to The Philippines. Jacques Denys Choisy, the Swiss botanist who first formally described the species, named it after its broad (latus in Latin) bracts. In Maranao it is called maragaoaq or tamiagau.

== Description ==
It is a tree with oval or elliptical leaves that come to a point at their tip. Its leaf margins are serrate. Its flowers are axillary. Its sepals are white.

Distribution:

Endemic to the Philippines. CATANDUANES, CEBU, LEYTE, LUZON: Albay, Aurora, Bataan, Batangas, Cagayan, Camarines Sur, Ifugao, Laguna, Nueva Ecija, Nueva Vizcaya, Quezon, Rizal, Sorsogon, Zambales, MARINDUQUE, MINDORO, PALAUI, PALAWAN, POLILLO.

=== Reproductive biology ===
The pollen of S. elegans is shed as permanent tetrads.
