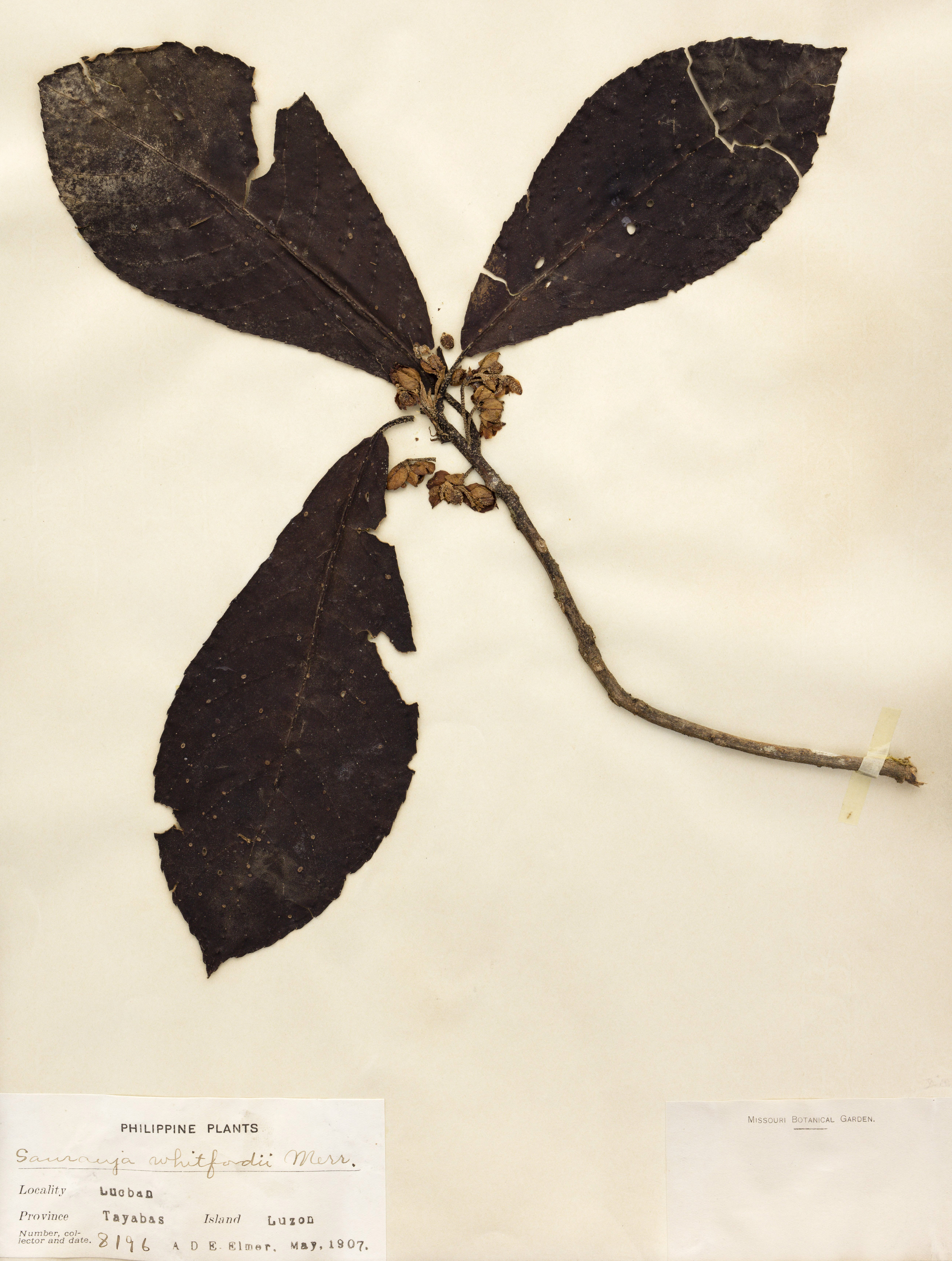
- Herbarium specimen of Saurauia whitfordii

Scientific classification
- Kingdom: Plantae
- Clade: Tracheophytes
- Clade: Angiosperms
- Clade: Eudicots
- Clade: Asterids
- Order: Ericales
- Family: Actinidiaceae
- Genus: Saurauia
- Species: S. whitfordii

Binomial name
- Saurauia whitfordii Merr.

= Saurauia whitfordii =

Species of flowering plant

Saurauia whitfordii is a species of plant in the Actinidiaceae family. It is native to the Philippines. Elmer Drew Merrill, the American botanist who first formally described the species, named it after Harry Nichols Whitford, another American botanist who collected the specimen Merrill examined.

== Description ==
It is a bush reaching 3–4 meters in height. Its oblong leaves vary in size but are generally 15–20 by 7–8 centimeters and come to a short tapering point at their tips. The leaf margins have fine spiny serrations. The leaves have smooth dark upper surfaces and smooth paler lower surfaces. The leaves have 12 pairs of secondary veins emanating from their midribs. Its scaly petioles are 2–3 centimeters long. Its axillary inflorescences are organized in cymes on peduncles that are 2–3 centimeters long. Its flowers have male and female reproductive structures. Its flowers have a 5–6 millimeter long by 3.5 millimeter wide calyx. Its flowers have white petals that are 8 millimeters long. Its flowers have up to 20 stamens. Its flowers have smooth ovaries with three chambers. Its fruit 5–6 millimeters in diameter with numerous seeds that are 1 millimeter in length.

=== Reproductive biology ===
The pollen of Saurauia whitfordii is shed as permanent tetrads.
