= Saurauia pentapetala =

Conservation status
- Least Concern (IUCN 3.1)

Scientific classification
- Kingdom: Plantae
- Clade: Tracheophytes
- Clade: Angiosperms
- Clade: Eudicots
- Clade: Asterids
- Order: Ericales
- Family: Actinidiaceae
- Genus: Saurauia
- Species: S. pentapetala

Binomial name
- Saurauia pentapetala (Jack) Hoogland

Synonyms
- Ternstroemia pentapetala Jack

Species of flowering plant

Saurauia pentapetala is a species of plant in the Actinidiaceae family. It is found in Malaysia and Thailand.
