= Saurauia bogoriensis =

Conservation status
- Critically Endangered (IUCN 3.1)

Scientific classification
- Kingdom: Plantae
- Clade: Tracheophytes
- Clade: Angiosperms
- Clade: Eudicots
- Clade: Asterids
- Order: Ericales
- Family: Actinidiaceae
- Genus: Saurauia
- Species: S. bogoriensis

Binomial name
- Saurauia bogoriensis Hoogland

Species of tree

Saurauia bogoriensis is a species of plant in the family Actinidiaceae. It is a tree endemic to Java in Indonesia. It is a critically endangered species threatened by habitat loss.
