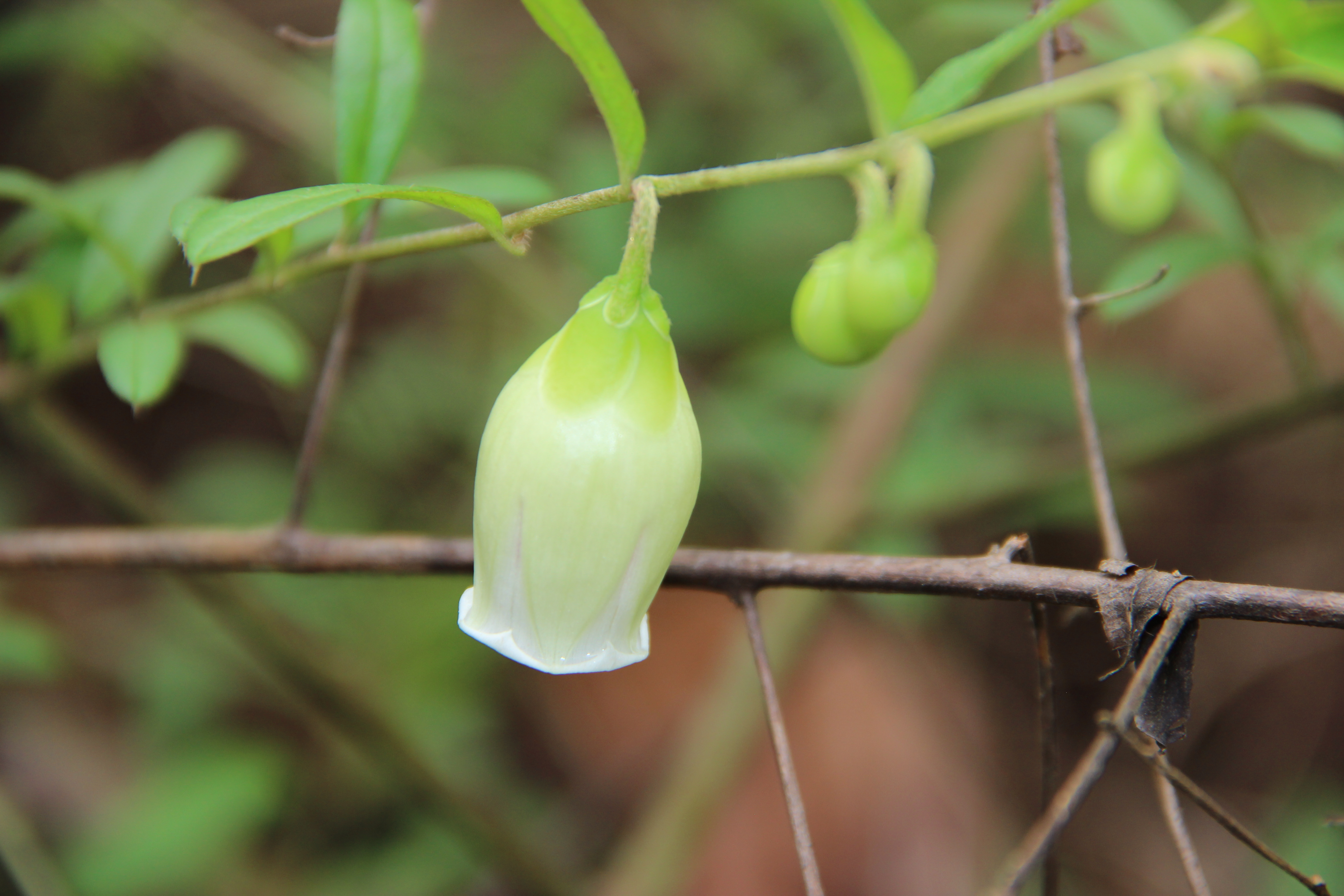
- Blinkworthia lycioides

Scientific classification
- Kingdom: Plantae
- Clade: Tracheophytes
- Clade: Angiosperms
- Clade: Eudicots
- Clade: Asterids
- Order: Solanales
- Family: Convolvulaceae
- Genus: Blinkworthia; Choisy

= Blinkworthia =

Genus of flowering plants

Blinkworthia is a genus of flowering plants belonging to the family Convolvulaceae.

Its native range is Southern China to Indo-China.

Species:

- Blinkworthia convolvuloides Prain
- Blinkworthia lycioides Choisy
