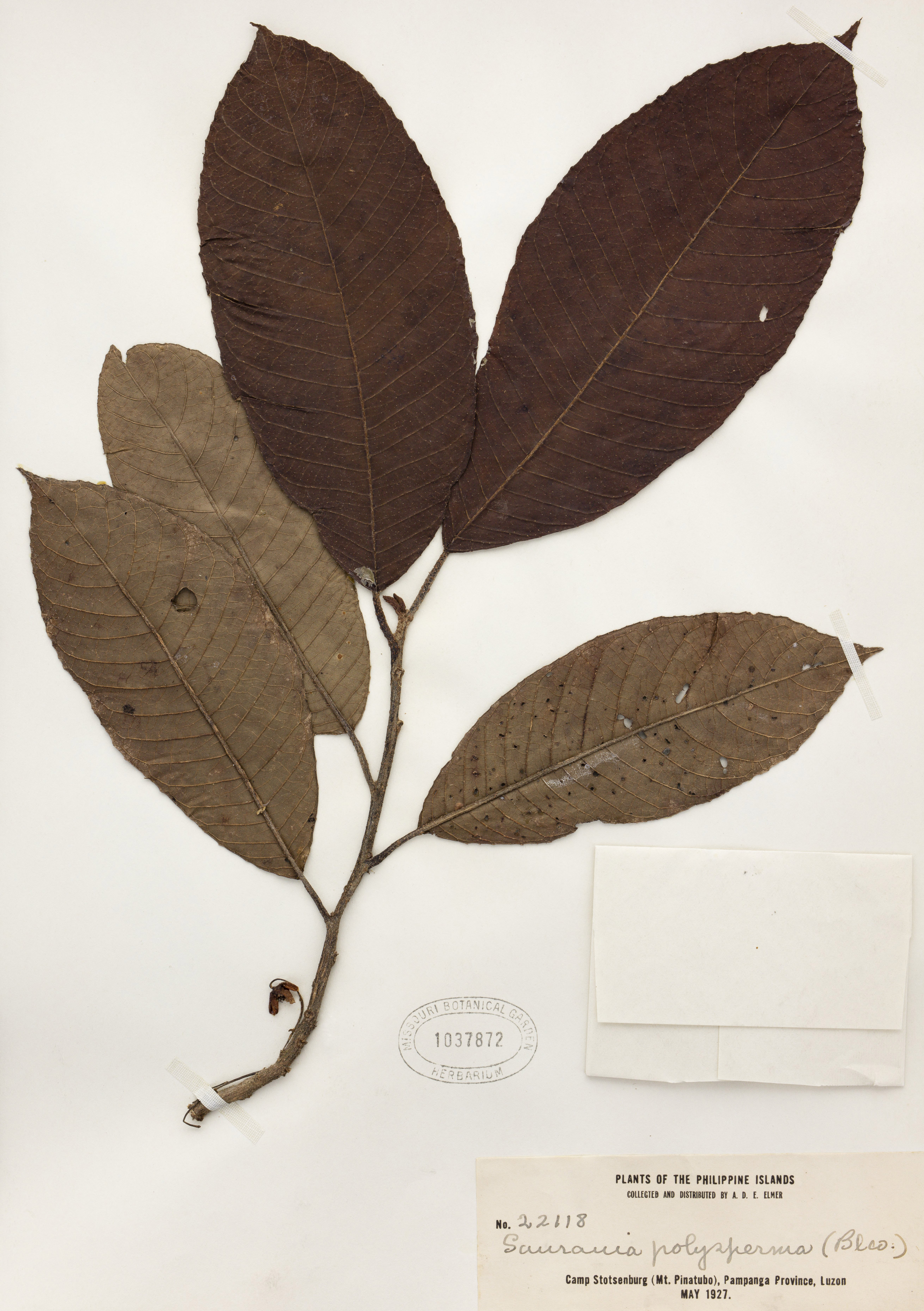
- Herbarium specimen of Saurauia polysperma.

Scientific classification
- Kingdom: Plantae
- Clade: Embryophytes
- Clade: Tracheophytes
- Clade: Angiosperms
- Clade: Eudicots
- Clade: Asterids
- Order: Ericales
- Family: Actinidiaceae
- Genus: Saurauia
- Species: S. polysperma

Binomial name
- Saurauia polysperma (Blanco) Merr.

Synonyms
- Saurauia subglabra Merr. Gordonia polysperma Blanco

= Saurauia polysperma =

Species of flowering plant

Saurauia polysperma is a species of flowering plant in the family Actinidiaceae. It is endemic to the Philippines. In the Philippines it is also known as tsuke. Francisco Manuel Blanco, the Augustinian friar who first formally described the species, using the basionym Gordonia polysperma, named it after its many seeds (Latinized form of Greek σπέρμα, spérma).

== Description ==
It is a small tree reaching about 1.5 meters (4 ft 11 in) in height. Its leaves are narrow and tapering with serrated margins and are almost hairless. Its petioles are very short. Its Inflorescences are organized as panicles each bearing a few flowers. Its inflorescences are axillary. Its flowers have a calyx with 5 oval-shaped sepals fused at their base. Its corolla has 5 oval lobes that are fused at their base. Each lobe has a notched tip. Its flowers have up to 30 stamens. Its fertilized ovaries have chambers, each containing numerous seeds.

== Reproductive biology ==
The pollen of Saurauia polysperma is shed as permanent tetrads.
