= Saurauia latipetala =

Conservation status
- Vulnerable (IUCN 2.3)

Scientific classification
- Kingdom: Plantae
- Clade: Tracheophytes
- Clade: Angiosperms
- Clade: Eudicots
- Clade: Asterids
- Order: Ericales
- Family: Actinidiaceae
- Genus: Saurauia
- Species: S. latipetala

Binomial name
- Saurauia latipetala Hemsley

Species of flowering plant

Saurauia latipetala is a species of plant in the Actinidiaceae family. It is found in Guatemala and Mexico. It is threatened by habitat loss.
