= Saurauia malayana =

Conservation status
- Least Concern (IUCN 3.1)

Scientific classification
- Kingdom: Plantae
- Clade: Tracheophytes
- Clade: Angiosperms
- Clade: Eudicots
- Clade: Asterids
- Order: Ericales
- Family: Actinidiaceae
- Genus: Saurauia
- Species: S. malayana

Binomial name
- Saurauia malayana Hoogland

Species of tree

Saurauia malayana is a species of plant in the family Actinidiaceae. It is a tree endemic to Peninsular Malaysia. It is threatened by habitat loss.
