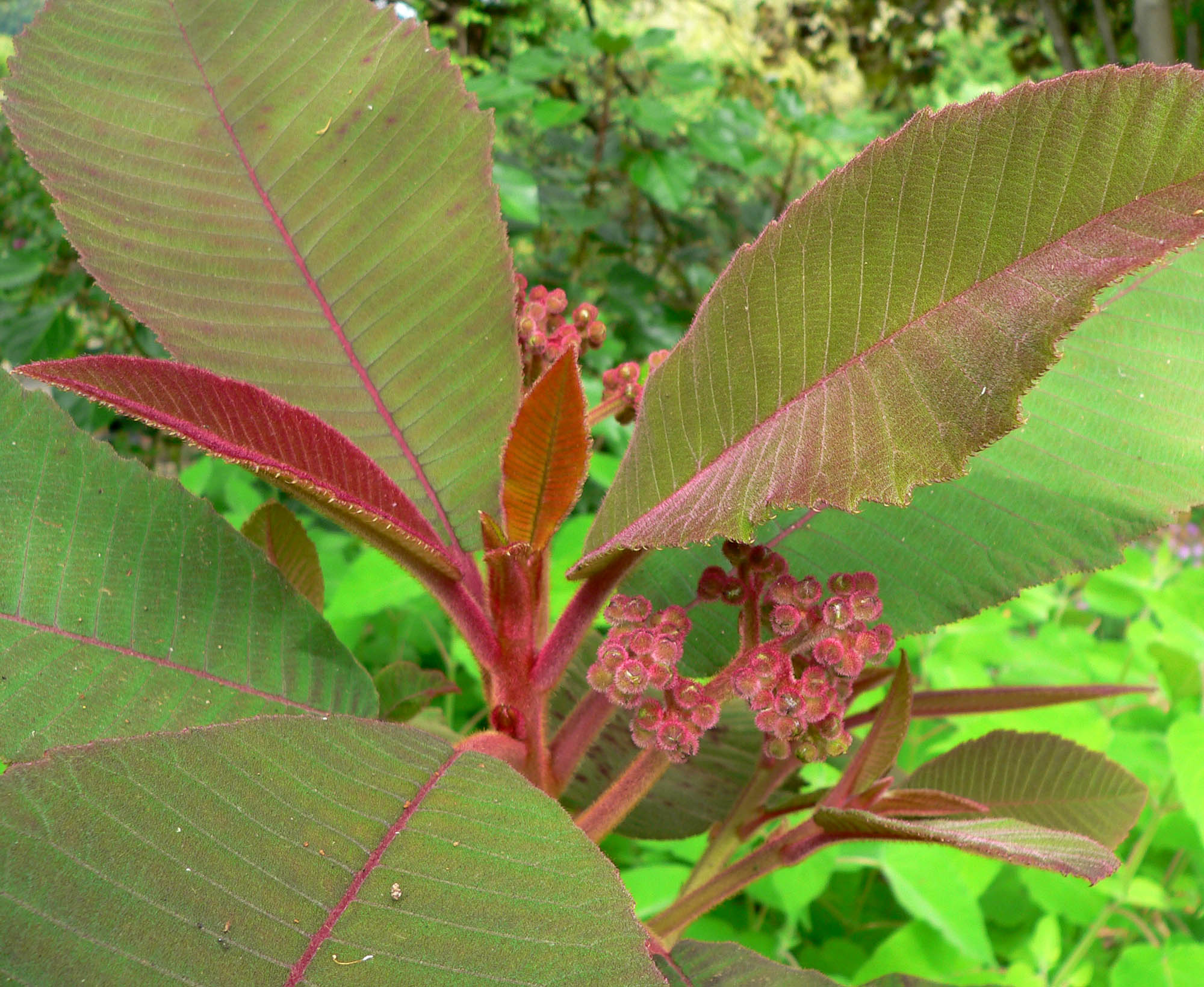
- Saurauia madrensis

Scientific classification
- Kingdom: Plantae
- Clade: Tracheophytes
- Clade: Angiosperms
- Clade: Eudicots
- Clade: Asterids
- Order: Ericales
- Family: Actinidiaceae
- Genus: Saurauia; Willd.

Synonyms
- Apatelia DC. (1822); Blumia Spreng. (1826); Draytonia A.Gray (1853); Marumia Reinw. (1825); Obelanthera Turcz. (1847); Overstratia Deschamps ex R.Br. (1840); Palaua Ruiz & Pav., nom. illeg.; Parivoa F.Dietr., nom. illeg.; Reinwardtia Blume ex Nees, nom. illeg.; Scapha Noronha ex Choisy (1855); Synarrhena F.Muell., nom. provis.; Tonshia Buch.-Ham. ex D.Don (1825); Trematanthera F.Muell. (1886); Vanalphimia Lesch. ex DC. (1822); Davya Moc. & Sessé ex DC. (1824); Leucothea Moc. & Sessé ex DC., not validly publ.

= Saurauia =

Genus of flowering plants

Saurauia is a genus of plants in the family Actinidiaceae. It comprises about over 300 species distributed in the tropics and subtropics of Asia and South and Central America. Genetic evidence and the cell biology of the group support monophyly of the genus. Monophyly of the genus is also supported by micromorphological characters and by phylogenetic analysis, although the exact evolutionary relationships of Saurauia with the other two genera of the Actinidiaceae, Actinidia and Clematoclethra, are not well understood. It is also the only extant genus within its family whose natural distribution includes areas outside of Asia (tropical South and Central America).

== Description ==
The floral characteristics of Saurauia are similar to those in the other members of the Actinidiaceae. The main floral differences between Saurauia and the other members are that the species of Saurauia have 3-5 carpels while Actinidia has 3-30 or more and Clematoclethra has 4 or 5. Also, Saurauia is the only genus in the Actinidiaceae whose members may be monoecious or functionally dioecious.

== Fossil record ==
The oldest fossil records of Saurauia include characteristic seed synapomorphies of the genus that are from the late Turonian (about 89 Ma) of Central Europe. Two extinct species were established, †Saurauia alenae and †Saurauia antique, both are recorded from several assemblages in Central Europe and ranging in age from the late Turonian to the Maastrichtian.

== Species ==
Species include:

- Saurauia adenodonta Sleumer
- Saurauia aequatoriensis Sprague
- Saurauia aguaricana Soejarto
- Saurauia avellana Elmer
- Saurauia bogoriensis R.D. Hoogland
- Saurauia bracteosa DC.
- Saurauia cauliflora DC.
- Saurauia clementis Merr.
- Saurauia copelandii Elmer
- Saurauia crassisepala Soejarto
- Saurauia elegans (Choisy) Fern.-Vill.
- Saurauia erythrocarpa C.F.Liang & Y.S.Wang
- Saurauia glabra Merr.
- Saurauia harlingii Soejarto
- Saurauia herthae Sleumer
- Saurauia klemmei Merr.
- Saurauia lanceolata Ruiz & Pav.
- Saurauia latibractea Choisy
- Saurauia latipetala Hemsley
- Saurauia laxiflora Soejarto
- Saurauia lehmannii Hieron.
- Saurauia leucocarpa Schlecht.
- Saurauia magnifica Soejarto
- Saurauia mahmudii R.D. Hoogland
- Saurauia malayana Hoogl.
- Saurauia merrillii Elmer
- Saurauia mexiae Killip ex Soejarto
- Saurauia microphylla Linden ex Lindl. & Paxton
- Saurauia montana Seem.
- Saurauia napaulensis DC.
- Saurauia oreophila Hemsley
- Saurauia papillulosa Merr.
- Saurauia pentapetala (Jack) R.D.Hoogland
- Saurauia polysperma (Blanco) Merr.
- Saurauia pseudostrigillosa Buscal.
- Saurauia punduana Wall.
- Saurauia pustulata G. Hunter
- Saurauia rubens Ridl.
- Saurauia rubrisepala Soejarto
- Saurauia scabrida Hemsley
- Saurauia schultzeorum Sleumer
- Saurauia seibertii Standley
- Saurauia serrata DC.
- Saurauia sparsiflora Elmer
- Saurauia striata Soejarto
- Saurauia tambensis Killip
- Saurauia villosa DC.
- Saurauia whitfordii Merr.
