= Saurauia lehmannii =

Conservation status
- Near Threatened (IUCN 3.1)

Scientific classification
- Kingdom: Plantae
- Clade: Tracheophytes
- Clade: Angiosperms
- Clade: Eudicots
- Clade: Asterids
- Order: Ericales
- Family: Actinidiaceae
- Genus: Saurauia
- Species: S. lehmannii

Binomial name
- Saurauia lehmannii Hieron.

Species of flowering plant

Saurauia lehmannii is a species of plant in the Actinidiaceae family. It is endemic to Ecuador. Its natural habitats are subtropical or tropical moist lowland forests, subtropical or tropical moist montane forests, and subtropical or tropical high-altitude shrubland. It is threatened by habitat loss.
