= Saurauia rubens =

Conservation status
- Near Threatened (IUCN 2.3)

Scientific classification
- Kingdom: Plantae
- Clade: Tracheophytes
- Clade: Angiosperms
- Clade: Eudicots
- Clade: Asterids
- Order: Ericales
- Family: Actinidiaceae
- Genus: Saurauia
- Species: S. rubens

Binomial name
- Saurauia rubens Ridley

Species of tree

Saurauia rubens is a species of plant in the family Actinidiaceae. It is a tree endemic to Peninsular Malaysia. It is threatened by habitat loss.
