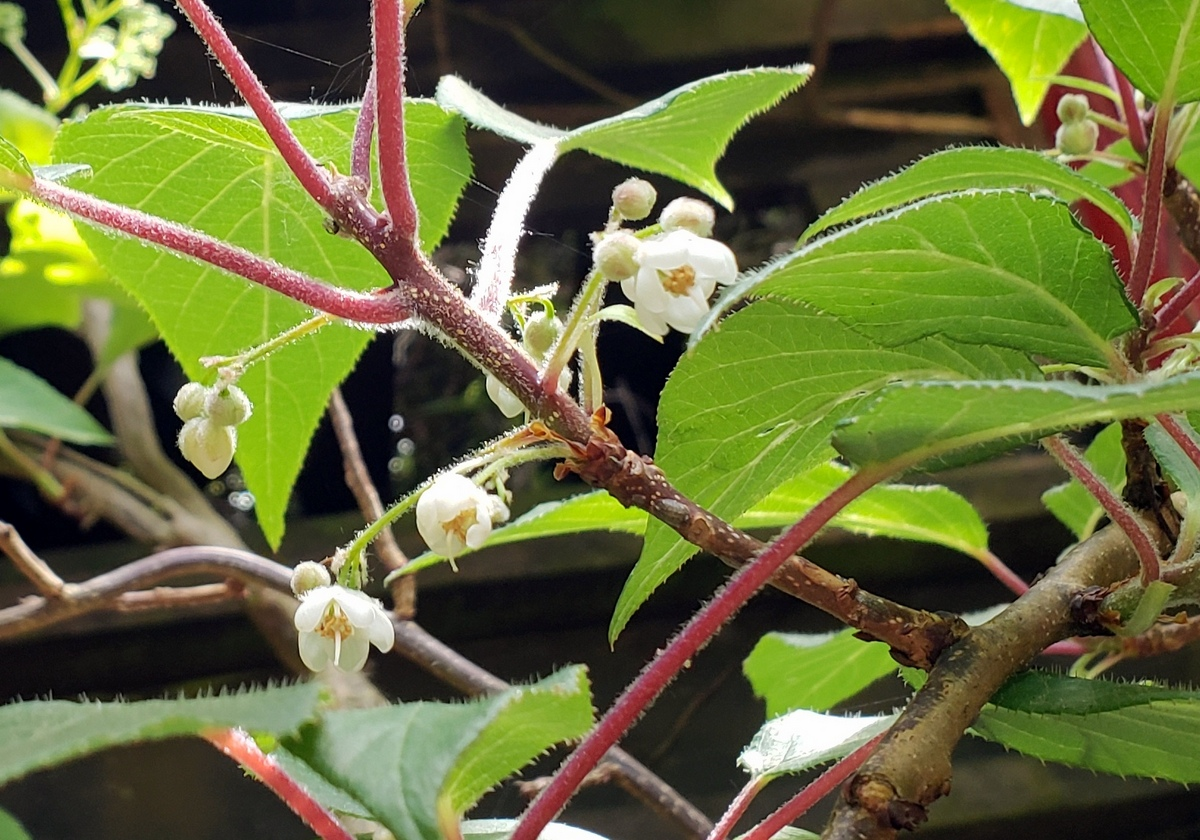
- Clematoclethra scandens subsp. hemsleyi leaves, flowers and branches

Scientific classification
- Kingdom: Plantae
- Clade: Tracheophytes
- Clade: Angiosperms
- Clade: Eudicots
- Clade: Asterids
- Order: Ericales
- Family: Actinidiaceae
- Genus: Clematoclethra; Maxim.

= Clematoclethra =

Genus of flowering plants

Clematoclethra is a genus of plants in the family Actinidiaceae. It contains about 20 species and is endemic to subtropical and temperate regions of central and western China. Monophyly of the group is supported by genetic evidence and also evidence based on the cell biology of members of the genus. Monophyly of the genus is also supported by micromorphological characters of foliar trichomes and by phylogenetic analysis, although the exact evolutionary relationships of this genus with the other two genera of the Actinidiaceae, the Actinidia and the Saurauia, are not well understood.

The floral characteristics of the Clematoclethra are similar to the other members of the Actinidiaceae. The main floral differences between the Clematoclethra and the other members of the Actinidiaceae are that members of the Clematoclethra have 10 stamens instead of numerous stamens, and have a united, hollow, and fluted style as compared to a free style that the other members of the Actinidiaceae have. Clematoclethra has been described as being dioecious or having bisexual flowers in the literature.
