= Saurauia laxiflora =

Conservation status
- Near Threatened (IUCN 3.1)

Scientific classification
- Kingdom: Plantae
- Clade: Tracheophytes
- Clade: Angiosperms
- Clade: Eudicots
- Clade: Asterids
- Order: Ericales
- Family: Actinidiaceae
- Genus: Saurauia
- Species: S. laxiflora

Binomial name
- Saurauia laxiflora Soejarto

Species of flowering plant

Saurauia laxiflora is a species of plant in the Actinidiaceae family. It is endemic to Ecuador. Its natural habitat is subtropical or tropical moist montane forests. It is threatened by habitat loss.
