= Saurauia serrata =

Conservation status
- Near Threatened (IUCN 3.1)

Scientific classification
- Kingdom: Plantae
- Clade: Tracheophytes
- Clade: Angiosperms
- Clade: Eudicots
- Clade: Asterids
- Order: Ericales
- Family: Actinidiaceae
- Genus: Saurauia
- Species: S. serrata

Binomial name
- Saurauia serrata DC.

Synonyms
- Apatelia glabrata DC.; Coriaria cuneifolia Sessé & Moc.; Davya serrata Moc. & Sessé ex DC.; Leucothea serrata Moc. & Sessé ex DC.; Saurauia glabrata (DC.) Steud.; Saurauia pedunculata var. fluviatilis Buscal.; Saurauia pedunculata var. reticulata (Rose) Buscal.; Saurauia pedunculata var. strigillosa Buscal.; Saurauia pseudopedunculata Buscal.; Saurauia pseudopringlei var. fluviatilis Buscal.; Saurauia reticulata Rose

Species of tree

Saurauia serrata is a species of flowering plant in the Actinidiaceae family. It is a tree native to Guatemala and Mexico.
