= Saurauia bracteosa =

Conservation status
- Vulnerable (IUCN 2.3)

Scientific classification
- Kingdom: Plantae
- Clade: Tracheophytes
- Clade: Angiosperms
- Clade: Eudicots
- Clade: Asterids
- Order: Ericales
- Family: Actinidiaceae
- Genus: Saurauia
- Species: S. bracteosa

Binomial name
- Saurauia bracteosa DC.

Species of flowering plant

Saurauia bracteosa is a species of plant in the Actinidiaceae family. The scientific name Saurauia bracteosa was first published by the botanist Augustin Pyramus de Candolle in 1822. It is found in Sumatra, Java, Bali and Lesser Sunda Islands in Indonesia with local name "Pirdot".
