= Saurauia lanceolata =

Conservation status
- Vulnerable (IUCN 2.3)

Scientific classification
- Kingdom: Plantae
- Clade: Tracheophytes
- Clade: Angiosperms
- Clade: Eudicots
- Clade: Asterids
- Order: Ericales
- Family: Actinidiaceae
- Genus: Saurauia
- Species: S. lanceolata

Binomial name
- Saurauia lanceolata DC.

Synonyms
- Saurauia micrantha Blume

Species of plant

Saurauia lanceolata is a species of plant in the Actinidiaceae family. It is endemic to Java in Indonesia.
