= Saurauia scabrida =

Conservation status
- Near Threatened (IUCN 3.1)

Scientific classification
- Kingdom: Plantae
- Clade: Tracheophytes
- Clade: Angiosperms
- Clade: Eudicots
- Clade: Asterids
- Order: Ericales
- Family: Actinidiaceae
- Genus: Saurauia
- Species: S. scabrida

Binomial name
- Saurauia scabrida Hemsl.

Synonyms
- Saurauia villosa var. scabrida (Hemsl.) Buscal.; Saurauia cana B.T.Keller & Breedlove; Saurauia nelsonii Rose; Saurauia scabrida var. hemsleyana Buscal.; Saurauia selerorum var. pseudonelsonii Buscal.

Species of tree

Saurauia scabrida is a species of flowering plant in the family Actinidiaceae. It is endemic to Mexico.
