= Saurauia villosa =

Conservation status
- Vulnerable (IUCN 2.3)

Scientific classification
- Kingdom: Plantae
- Clade: Tracheophytes
- Clade: Angiosperms
- Clade: Eudicots
- Clade: Asterids
- Order: Ericales
- Family: Actinidiaceae
- Genus: Saurauia
- Species: S. villosa

Binomial name
- Saurauia villosa DC.

Species of tree

Saurauia villosa is a species of plant in the Actinidiaceae family. It is endemic to the Mesoamerican countries of Mexico, Guatemala, El Salvador, and Honduras. It is a small tree found in cloud forests, as well as pine-oak forests and secondary forests.
