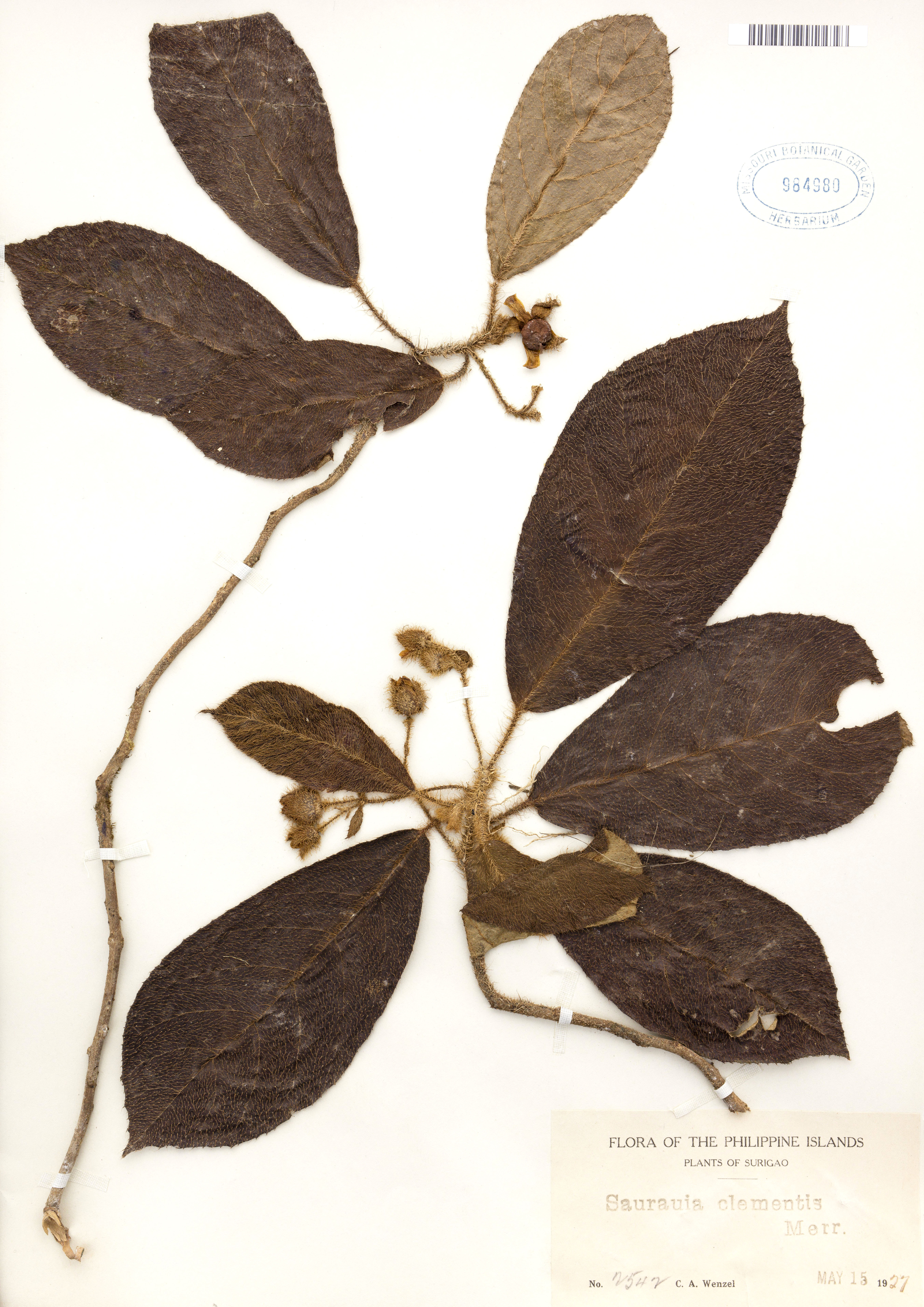
- Herbarium specimen of Saurauia clementis.

Conservation status
- Least Concern (IUCN 3.1)

Scientific classification
- Kingdom: Plantae
- Clade: Tracheophytes
- Clade: Angiosperms
- Clade: Eudicots
- Clade: Asterids
- Order: Ericales
- Family: Actinidiaceae
- Genus: Saurauia
- Species: S. clementis

Binomial name
- Saurauia clementis Merr.

= Saurauia clementis =

Species of flowering plant

Saurauia clementis is a species of flowering plant in the family Actinidiaceae. It is endemic to the Philippines. Elmer Drew Merrill, the American botanist who first formally described the species, named it after Mary Strong Clemens, the American botanist who collected the specimen that he examined.

== Description ==
It is a bush or small tree. Its membranous leaves are 10–16 centimeters (3.9–6.3 in) by 4–7 centimeters (1.6–2.8 in) and their tips come to a shallow point. The leaves are dark on their upper side, paler below, and bristly on both surfaces. The leaves have 7–8 pairs of secondary veins emanating from their midribs. The leaf margins have bristly serrations. Its densely bristly petioles are 1 millimeter (0.039 in) long. Inflorescences are axillary cymes with a few flowers organized on densely bristly peduncles 4–8 centimeters (1.6–3.1 in) in length. Its flowers have 5 oval-shaped, overlapping sepals, 8 millimeters (0.31 in) long. The exposed parts of the outer surface of the sepals have dark purple bristles that are 3 millimeters (0.12 in) long. The flowers have corollas that are 10 millimeters (0.39 in) long with 5 lobes; each lobe is notched at the top. Its flowers have 20 stamens that are 3 millimeters (0.12 in) long. Each flower has a 3-chambered ovary. Each ovary contains numerous ovules. Its flowers have 3 styles that are 6 millimeters (0.24 in) long and fused at their base for the last 1 millimeter (0.039 in).

== Reproductive biology ==
The pollen of S. clementis is shed as permanent tetrads.
