= Saurauia glabra =

Scientific classification
- Kingdom: Plantae
- Clade: Tracheophytes
- Clade: Angiosperms
- Clade: Eudicots
- Clade: Asterids
- Order: Ericales
- Family: Actinidiaceae
- Genus: Saurauia
- Species: S. glabra

Binomial name
- Saurauia glabra Merr.

Species of flowering plant

Saurauia glabra is a species of plant in the Actinidiaceae family. It is native to Borneo. Elmer Drew Merrill, the American botanist who first formally described the species, named it after its hairlessness (glaber in Latin).

== Description ==
It is a tree reaching 15 meters in height. Its leathery leaves are 10-18 by 4-8 centimeters and their tips come to a shallow point. The leaves are green on their upper side, brownish below, and smooth on both surfaces. The leaves have 8-15 pairs of secondary veins emanating from their midribs. The leaf margins have shallow rounded teeth. Its petioles are 1-3 centimeter long. It has inflorescences of 25-50 flowers on peduncles 2-8 centimeters in length. Its flowers have 5 sepals. The outer pair are elliptical and 6 by 3.3 millimeters. The inner 3 are 8 millimeters long. The flowers have a corolla with 5 lobes; each lobe is 5-9 by 3.5-6 millimeters. Its flowers have around 30-80 stamens that are 0.5-0.85 millimeters in length. Each flower has a 4-5 chambered ovary. Its flowers have 3 styles that are 9 millimeters long, and fused at their base for the last 1-2 millimeters.

=== Reproductive Biology ===
The pollen of S. glabra is shed as permanent tetrads.
