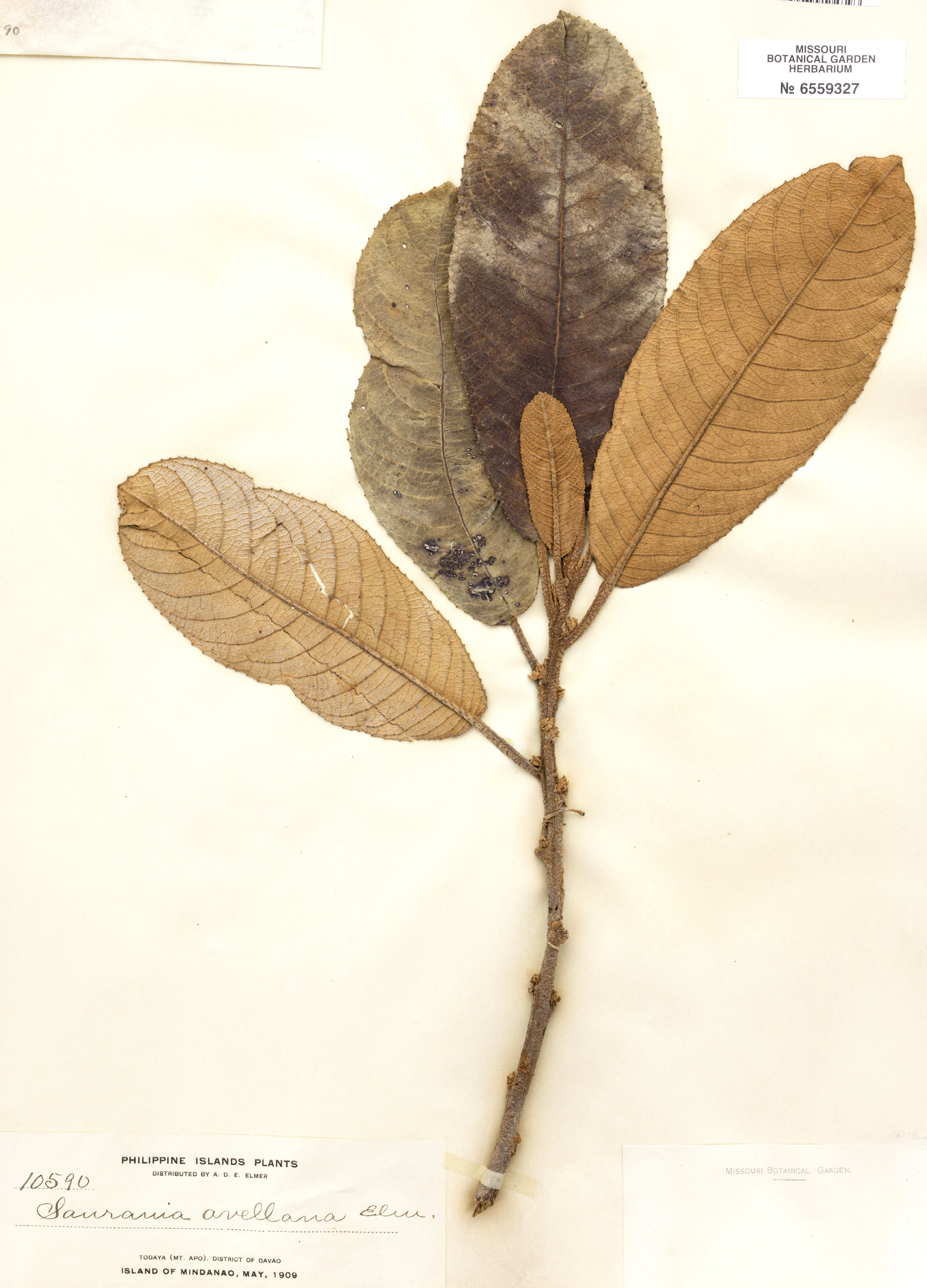
- Herbarium specimen of Saurauia avellana.

Scientific classification
- Kingdom: Plantae
- Clade: Tracheophytes
- Clade: Angiosperms
- Clade: Eudicots
- Clade: Asterids
- Order: Ericales
- Family: Actinidiaceae
- Genus: Saurauia
- Species: S. avellana

Binomial name
- Saurauia avellana Elmer

= Saurauia avellana =

Species of flowering plant

Saurauia avellana is a species of plant in the Actinidiaceae family. It is native to the Philippines. Adolph Daniel Edward Elmer, the American botanist who first formally described the species, named it after the dense covering of hazel-colored (avellaneus in Latin) downy hair covering the underside of its leaves.

== Description ==
It is a bush reaching 3 to 5 meters in height. Its rigid leaves are variable in size, but are normally 20 by 8 centimeters with rounded tips. The leaves are hairless on their upper surface and dense with nut-brown hair on their lower surface. The leaves have 13-17 pairs of secondary veins emanating from their midribs. The leaf margins have small serrations. Its scaly petioles are 1-3 millimeters long. Inflorescences are axillary and organized on peduncles 1-5 millimeters in length. The peduncle can be branched and more than one can emerge from the same leaf axil. Each flower is on a scaly pedicel 3-5 millimeters in length. Its flowers have 5 sepals, 5 millimeters long, that are united at their base. The sepals are scaly on their outer surface and smooth on their inner surface. Its flowers have 5 white petals that are united at their base. The petals are smooth on both surfaces. Its flowers have numerous stamens that are 1.75 millimeters long. Its styles are 3 millimeters long. Each flower has a 3-chambered superior ovary. Each ovary contains numerous ovules.

=== Reproductive biology ===
The pollen of Saurauia avellana is shed as permanent tetrads.
