= Edwin Copeland =

American botanist (1873–1964)

Edwin B. Copeland
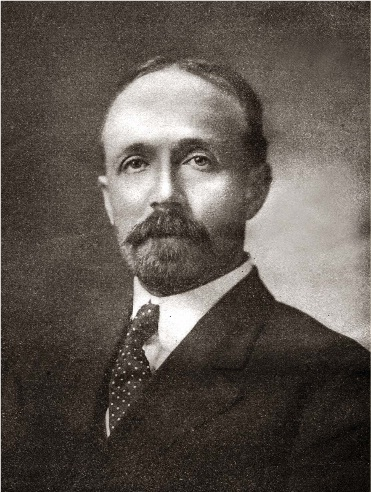
- Edwin Copeland, circa 1910
- Born: September 30, 1873; Monroe, Wisconsin
- Died: March 16, 1964 (aged 90); Chico, California
- Citizenship: USA
- Education: Stanford University; University of Halle
- Known for: Founding the University of the Philippines College of Agriculture; study of ferns
- Spouse: Ethel Faulkner Copeland
- Children: Herbert Copeland
- Scientific career
- Fields: Botany; Agriculture
- Workplaces: University of the Philippines Los Baños; University of California, Berkeley
- Thesis: thesis on the influence of light and temperature on turgor (1896)
- Author abbrev. (botany): Copel.

Edwin Bingham Copeland (September 30, 1873 – March 16, 1964) was an American botanist and agriculturist. He is known for founding the University of the Philippines College of Agriculture at Los Baños, Laguna and for being one of the America's leading pteridologists (one who studies ferns).

== Life ==
In 1903, he and his family moved to the Philippines, where he worked as a Systematic Botanist for the Bureau of Science. In 1909, he founded the University of the Philippines College of Agriculture at Los Baños, Laguna, now part of the University of the Philippines Los Baños, and served as its dean and also as a professor of plant physiology for eight years (1909–1917). In 1917, he returned to the United States and was a leading rice grower in Chico, California. In 1927, he began work as an Associate Curator at the University of California, Berkeley. In 1931, he worked for the Department of Agriculture of the Philippines, retiring in 1935. After retiring he returned to UC Berkeley and became a permanent Research Associate of the Department of Biology of the University of California. He is best known among American botanists for this latter period at UC. He was elected an Honorary Member of the American Fern Society in 1948.

During his career he described 35 new genera and some 600 new species of ferns. His personal herbarium totaled approximately 25,000 species and is now at the University of Michigan Herbarium. He wrote numerous articles and several books including "Elements of Philippine Agriculture" (1908), "The Coconut" (three editions, 1914, 1921, and 1931), "Rice" (1924), "Fern" (1964) and "Natural Conduct" (1928), a book on practical ethics. He issued the exsiccata Pteridophyta Philippinensia exsiccata (c. 1920). In a letter during his final months, a friend C.V. Morton wrote, "You have the consolation of knowing that your name is in constant use by fern students the world over." The fungus genus Copelandia was named after him.

On August 8, 1899, Copeland and partner E. N. Henderson were the first climbers known to reach summit of Junction Peak, a thirteener in the Sierra Nevada mountains of California.

His father was the zoologist Herbert Edson Copeland (1849–1876) and he was the father of biologist Herbert Copeland. He was married to Ethel Faulkner Copeland.

The standard author abbreviation Copel. is used to indicate this person as the author when citing a botanical name.

== Legacy ==
The following species of plants are named after him:

- Saurauia copelandii Elmer
