= Saurauia erythrocarpa =

Conservation status
- Vulnerable (IUCN 3.1)

Scientific classification
- Kingdom: Plantae
- Clade: Tracheophytes
- Clade: Angiosperms
- Clade: Eudicots
- Clade: Asterids
- Order: Ericales
- Family: Actinidiaceae
- Genus: Saurauia
- Species: S. erythrocarpa

Binomial name
- Saurauia erythrocarpa C.F.Liang & Y.S.Wang

Species of flowering plant

Saurauia erythrocarpa is a species of plant in the Actinidiaceae family. It is endemic to China.
