= Saurauia leucocarpa =

Conservation status
- Vulnerable (IUCN 2.3)

Scientific classification
- Kingdom: Plantae
- Clade: Tracheophytes
- Clade: Angiosperms
- Clade: Eudicots
- Clade: Asterids
- Order: Ericales
- Family: Actinidiaceae
- Genus: Saurauia
- Species: S. leucocarpa

Binomial name
- Saurauia leucocarpa Schlecht.

Species of tree

Saurauia leucocarpa is a species of plant in the Actinidiaceae family. It is endemic to Mexico.
