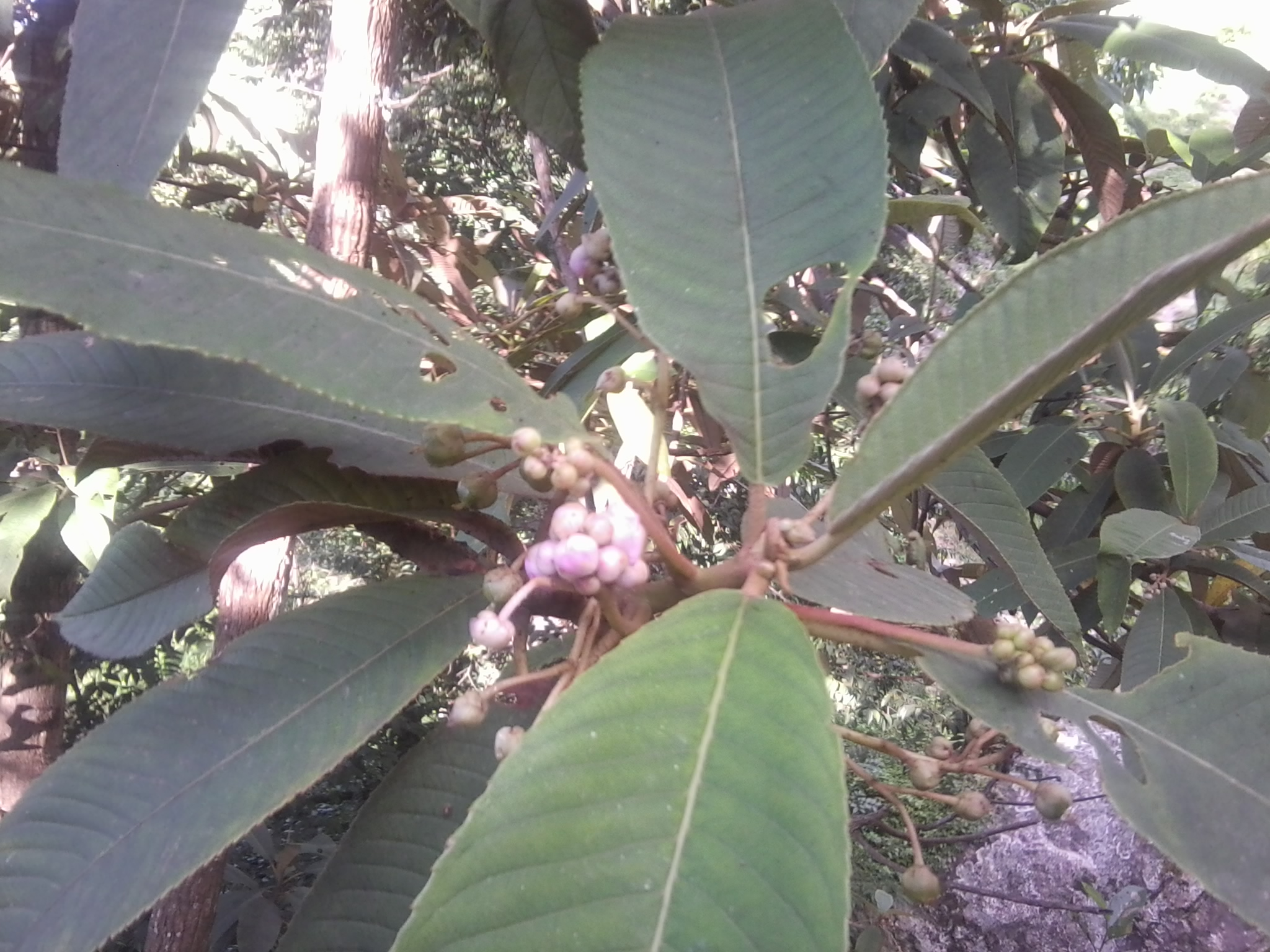

Conservation status
- Least Concern (IUCN 3.1)

Scientific classification
- Kingdom: Plantae
- Clade: Tracheophytes
- Clade: Angiosperms
- Clade: Eudicots
- Clade: Asterids
- Order: Ericales
- Family: Actinidiaceae
- Genus: Saurauia
- Species: S. napaulensis

Binomial name
- Saurauia napaulensis DC.

= Saurauia napaulensis =

Species of tree

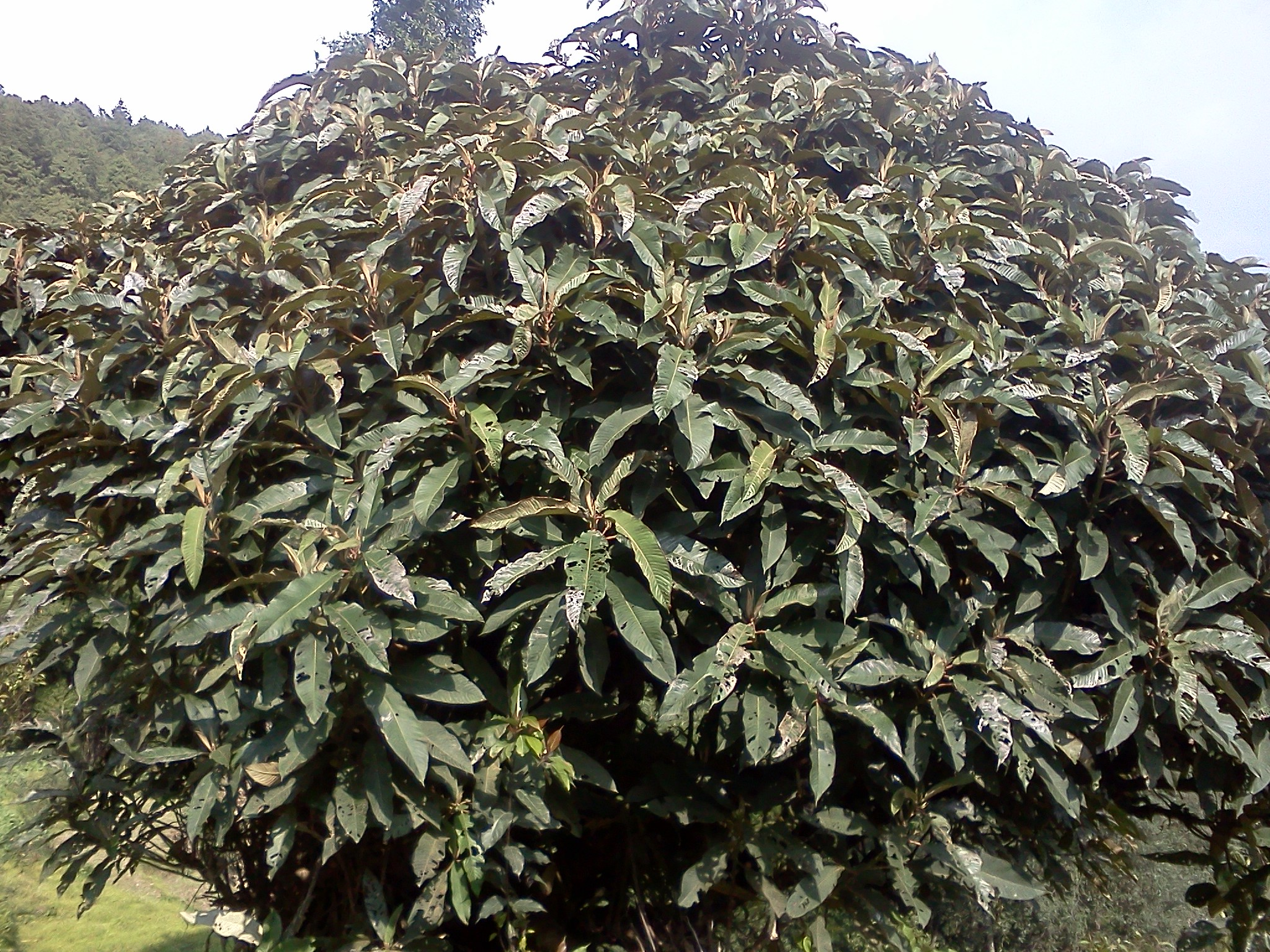
S. napaulensis in Nagarkot, Nepal

Saurauia napaulensis is a small to medium tree. Leaves 20–35 cm by 6.5–12 cm, apex acuminate, base rounded, margins with fine teeth; 30-35 pairs of straight prominent veins. Flowers about 1.5 cm in diameter, pink, in branched axillary inflorescences. Fruit a globose berry, about 8 mm in diameter.
