= Saurauia punduana =

Conservation status
- Critically Endangered (IUCN 3.1)

Scientific classification
- Kingdom: Plantae
- Clade: Tracheophytes
- Clade: Angiosperms
- Clade: Eudicots
- Clade: Asterids
- Order: Ericales
- Family: Actinidiaceae
- Genus: Saurauia
- Species: S. punduana

Binomial name
- Saurauia punduana Wall.

Synonyms
- Saurauia fasciculata var. abbreviata Choisy; Ternstroemia panduana Wall.

Species of flowering plant

Saurauia punduana is a species of flowering plant in the Actinidiaceae family. It is a tree native to the Bhutan and the Eastern Himalayas, Tibet, northeastern India, Bangladesh, and Myanmar, including Tamenglong district of Manipur.
