= Saurauia oreophila =

Conservation status
- Least Concern (IUCN 3.1)

Scientific classification
- Kingdom: Plantae
- Clade: Tracheophytes
- Clade: Angiosperms
- Clade: Eudicots
- Clade: Asterids
- Order: Ericales
- Family: Actinidiaceae
- Genus: Saurauia
- Species: S. oreophila

Binomial name
- Saurauia oreophila Hemsl.

Synonyms
- Saurauia oreophila f. genuina Buscal.; Saurauia leucocarpa var. stenophylla Buscal.; Saurauia oreophila f. rubra Buscal.; Saurauia parviflora f. dellessertiana Buscal.; Saurauia parviflora var. ghiesbreghtii Buscal.; Saurauia subalpina Donn.Sm.

Species of tree

Saurauia oreophila is a species of flowering plant in the family Actinidiaceae. It is found in Guatemala and Mexico. It is threatened by habitat loss.
