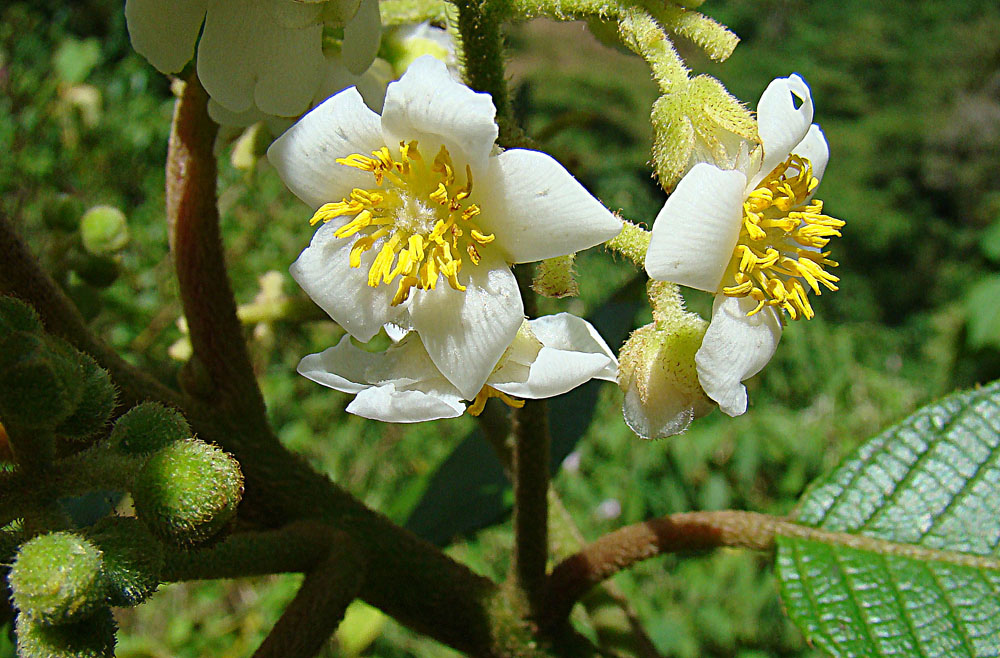

Scientific classification
- Kingdom: Plantae
- Clade: Tracheophytes
- Clade: Angiosperms
- Clade: Eudicots
- Clade: Asterids
- Order: Ericales
- Family: Actinidiaceae
- Genus: Saurauia
- Species: S. montana

Binomial name
- Saurauia montana Seem.

Synonyms
- Saurauia pseudoscabrida Saurauia veraguasensis

= Saurauia montana =

Species of tree

Saurauia montana is a tropical tree found in Honduras, Costa Rica, and Panama. It grows between 3 and 10 meters tall. The obovate leaves are toothed and can reach 30 cm in length.

The Latin specific epithet montana refers to mountains or coming from mountains.
