= Hooglandia =

Conservation status
- Near Threatened (IUCN 3.1)

Scientific classification
- Kingdom: Plantae
- Clade: Embryophytes
- Clade: Tracheophytes
- Clade: Angiosperms
- Clade: Eudicots
- Clade: Rosids
- Order: Oxalidales
- Family: Cunoniaceae
- Genus: Hooglandia; McPherson & Lowry
- Species: H. ignambiensis

Binomial name
- Hooglandia ignambiensis McPherson & Lowry

Genus of flowering plants

Hooglandia ignambiensis is a species of tree in the family Cunoniaceae. It is endemic to New Caledonia and the only species of the genus Hooglandia. It is named after Dutch botanist Ruurd Dirk Hoogland.
