= Saurauia seibertii =

Conservation status
- Least Concern (IUCN 3.1)

Scientific classification
- Kingdom: Plantae
- Clade: Tracheophytes
- Clade: Angiosperms
- Clade: Eudicots
- Clade: Asterids
- Order: Ericales
- Family: Actinidiaceae
- Genus: Saurauia
- Species: S. seibertii

Binomial name
- Saurauia seibertii Standley

Species of flowering plant

Saurauia seibertii is a species of plant in the Actinidiaceae family. It is endemic to Panama. It is threatened by habitat loss.
