= Saurauia pseudostrigillosa =

Conservation status
- Least Concern (IUCN 3.1)

Scientific classification
- Kingdom: Plantae
- Clade: Tracheophytes
- Clade: Angiosperms
- Clade: Eudicots
- Clade: Asterids
- Order: Ericales
- Family: Actinidiaceae
- Genus: Saurauia
- Species: S. pseudostrigillosa

Binomial name
- Saurauia pseudostrigillosa Buscal.

Species of flowering plant

Saurauia pseudostrigillosa is a species of plant in the Actinidiaceae family. It is endemic to Ecuador. Its natural habitats are subtropical or tropical moist lowland forests and subtropical or tropical moist montane forests. It is threatened by habitat loss.
