= Celestino Fernández-Villar =

Augustinian friar and Spanish botanist (1838-1907)

- Born: April 2, 1838; Asturias, Spain
- Died: April 29, 1907 (aged 69); Manila, The Philippines
- Scientific career
- Fields: Botany
- Author abbrev. (botany): Fern.-Vill.

Celestino Fernández-Villar (April 2, 1838 – April 29, 1907) was an Augustinian friar and botanist born in Asturias, Spain.

== Life ==
Fernández-Villar was born in Asturias, Spain on April 2, 1838. He studied as a seminarian in Oviedo. In 1855 he began his monastic training as an Augustinian novitiate in Valladolid. From 1859 to 1877 he served the convent associated with the Basilica del Santo Niño in Cebu City, Philippines. In 1877 he moved to Manila to lead the work on the third edition Francisco Manuel Blanco's Flora de Filipinas until 1883 . He was a parish priest in Miagao until 1885. He then travelled on church business to Rome, China, and Australia. From 1893 to 1897 he served as a pastor in the Philippine municipality Alimodian. After being taken prisoner during the Philippine Revolution he was shot 3 times on October 31, 1898 but survived and was able to seek safety in Iloilo. He then retired to Manila, where he died on April 29, 1907.

== Awards ==
In recognition of his botanical scholarship he was appointed as a corresponding academic of the Spanish Royal Academy of Sciences (Spanish: Real Academia de Ciencias Exactas, Físicas y Naturales).

== Legacy ==
He is the authority for at least 175 taxa including: IPNI. List of plant names with authority Fern.-Vill..
