= Ruurd Dirk Hoogland =

Ruurd Dirk Hoogland (1922 Leeuwarden - 18 November 1994 Paris) was a Dutch-born explorer and naturalist, who migrated to Australia and made numerous botanical expeditions to New Guinea, Oceania and Europe. He was an expert on the family Cunoniaceae. The standard author abbreviation Hoogland is used to indicate this person as the author when citing a botanical name.

He received his university education in Groningen and Leiden. He earned his doctorate in 1952 with a review of the genus Dillenia under Professor van Steenis and in that year he joined the Australian CSIRO in the Division of Land Research in Canberra as a botanist initially focusing on the then Australian dependency of Papua New Guinea. Subsequently, his field work included expeditions to remote Australian territories such as Lord Howe and Norfolk Islands, and to other Commonwealth countries including Sri Lanka and Malaysia. He transferred from CSIRO to the Research School of Biological Sciences at the Australian National University, but was forced to retire after contracting Myasthenia gravis. Despite this, he continued to work wherever he could find appropriate facilities, and was fortunate to obtain a visiting fellowship at the Laboratoire de Phanérogamie within the Muséum Nationale d'Histoire Naturelle in Paris before he turned 65, where he continued to work until shortly before his death. His last field trip was to New Caledonia about 6 months before his death. Throughout his career, he made regular visits and contributed specimens to collaborating herbaria or botanic gardens around the world including Sydney (over 740 specimens), Leiden and Kew Gardens, amongst many others.

== Plants named after author ==
Genera

- (Cunoniaceae) Hooglandia McPherson & Lowry

Species

- (Araceae) Homalomena hooglandii A.Hay
- (Asteraceae) Olearia hooglandii J.Kost.
- (Asteraceae) Senecio hooglandii Belcher
- (Cunoniaceae) Weinmannia hooglandii H.C.Hopkins & J.C.Bradford
- (Cyatheaceae) Alsophila hooglandii (Holttum) R.M.Tryon
- (Dilleniaceae) Hibbertia hooglandii J.R.Wheeler
- (Ericaceae) Vaccinium hooglandii Sleumer
- (Gleicheniaceae) Gleichenia hooglandii Holttum
- (Leguminosae) Archidendron hooglandii Verdc.
- (Leguminosae) Serianthes hooglandii (Fosb.) A.Kanis
- (Melastomataceae) Poikilogyne hooglandii Nayar
- (Monimiaceae) Palmeria hooglandii Philipson
- (Myristicaceae) Myristica hooglandii J.Sinclair
- (Onagraceae) Epilobium hooglandii P.H.Raven
- (Pandanaceae) Pandanus hooglandii H.St.John
- (Piperaceae) Piper hooglandii (I.Hutton & P.S.Green) M.A.Jaram.
- (Rosaceae) Potentilla hooglandii Kalkman
- (Rutaceae) Evodiella hooglandii B.L.Linden
