= Jacques Denys Choisy =

Swiss clergyman and botanist (1799–1859)

Jacques Denys (Denis) Choisy (5 April 1799, Jussy – 26 November 1859, Geneva) was a Swiss Protestant clergyman and botanist.

He studied theology, law, humanities and sciences at the Académie de Genève. In 1821 he became ordained as a minister, and during the following year, furthered his education in Paris. During his stay in Paris, he was accepted as a member of the Société d'histoire naturelle. Following his return to Geneva in 1824, he was named chair of rational philosophy at the Academy, a position he maintained until 1847.

As a student in Geneva, he came under the influence of Augustin Pyramus de Candolle, and in the process, developed a lifelong passion for botany. He was a principal contributor towards Candolle's publication of "Prodromus Systematis Naturalis Regni Vegetabilis", being the author of the sections involving the plant families Marcgraviaceae, Convolvulaceae, Hydroleaceae, Selaginaceae, Nyctaginaceae, Hypericineae and Guttiferae. The botanical genus Choisya (family Rutaceae) is named in his honor.

As a theologian/philosopher he published works with titles such as, "Des doctrines exclusives en philosophie rationelle" (1828) and "Les lois morales: Fragment d'un cours de philosophie morale" (1836).

== Selected botanical works ==
- Prodromus d'une monographie de la famille des hypéricinées, (9 editions issued from 1821 to 1983) – Prodomus of a monograph on Hypericineae.
- Descriptions des Hydroléacées, 1830 – Descriptions of Hydroleaceae.
- Convolvulaceae orientales, 1834 – Convolvulaceae Oriental
- Mémoire sur les familles des Ternstroemiacées et Camelliacées, 1854 – Treatise on the families Ternstroemiaceae and Camelliaceae.
