= Axillary bud =

Embryonic shoot located in the axil of a leaf or branch

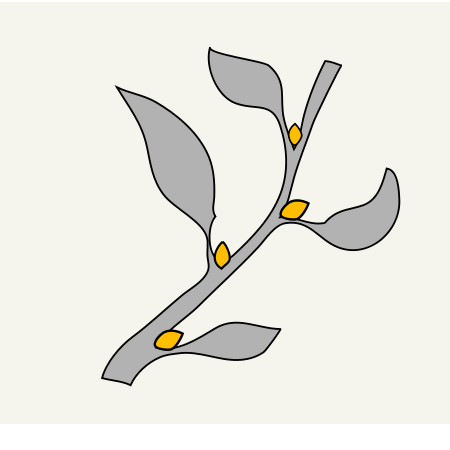
Axillary buds are located at the intersection of the leaf and stem of a plant.

The axillary bud (or lateral bud) is an embryonic or organogenic shoot located in the axil of a leaf. Each bud has the potential to form shoots, and may be specialized in producing either vegetative shoots (stems and branches) or reproductive shoots (flowers). Once formed, a bud may remain dormant for some time, or it may form a shoot immediately.

== Overview ==
An axillary bud is an embryonic or organogenic shoot which lies dormant at the junction of the stem and petiole of a plant. It arises exogenously from outer layer of cortex of the stem.

Axillary buds do not become actively growing shoots on plants with strong apical dominance (the tendency to grow just the terminal bud on the main stem). Apical dominance occurs because the shoot apical meristem produces auxin which prevents axillary buds from growing. The axillary buds begin developing when they are exposed to less auxin, for example if the plant naturally has weak apical dominance, if apical dominance is broken by removing the terminal bud, or if the terminal bud has grown far enough away for the auxin to have less of an effect.

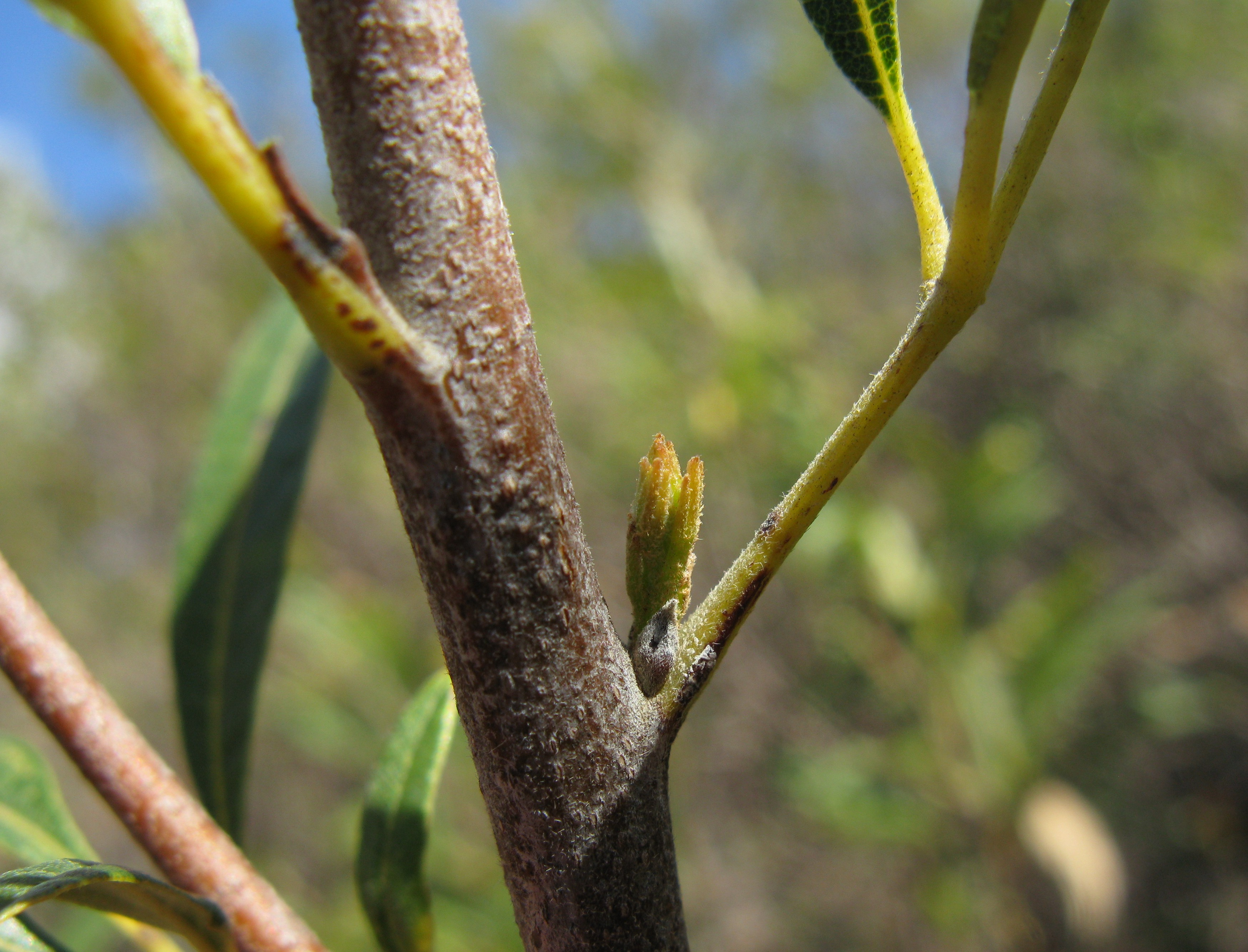
Example of an axillary bud. Axillary buds have the potential to form new shoots and become branches or flowers.

An example of axillary buds are the eyes of the potato.

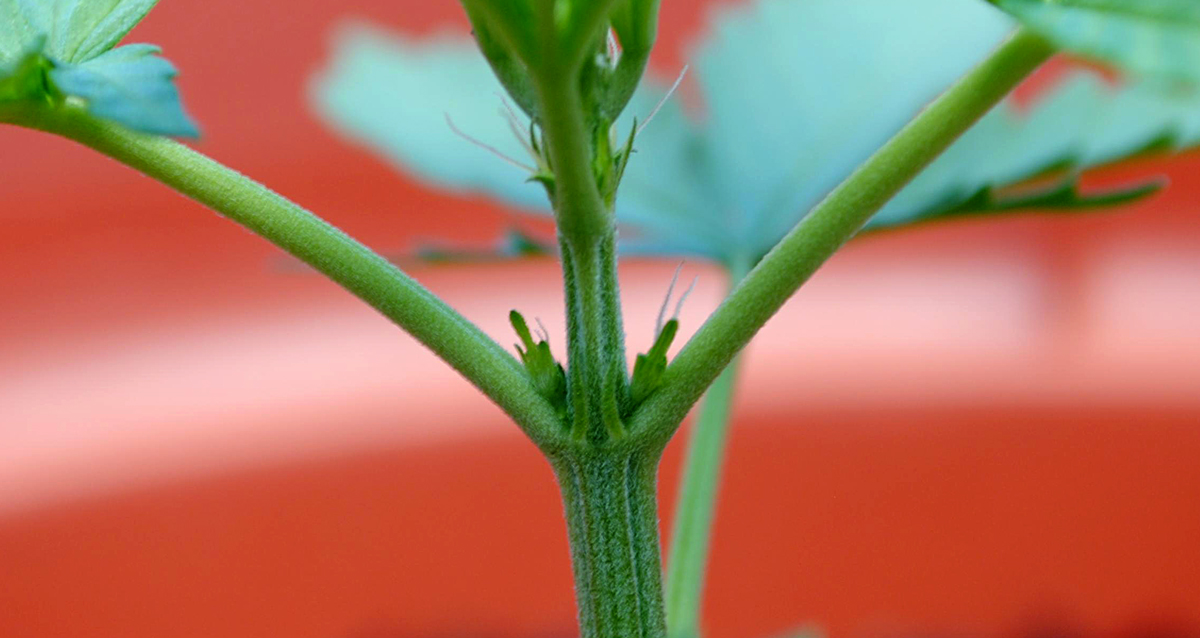
Axillary buds only develop if they're not exposed to high levels of auxin from the terminal bud.

=== Effects of auxin ===
As the apical meristem grows and forms leaves, a region of meristematic cells is left behind at the node between the stem and the leaf. These axillary buds are usually dormant, inhibited by auxin produced by the apical meristem, which is known as apical dominance.

If the apical meristem is removed, or has grown a sufficient distance away from an axillary bud, the axillary bud may become activated (or more appropriately freed from hormone inhibition). Like the apical meristem, axillary buds can develop into a stem or flower.

=== Diseases that affect axillary buds ===
Certain plant diseases - notably phytoplasmas - can cause the proliferation of axillary buds, and cause plants to become bushy in appearance.
