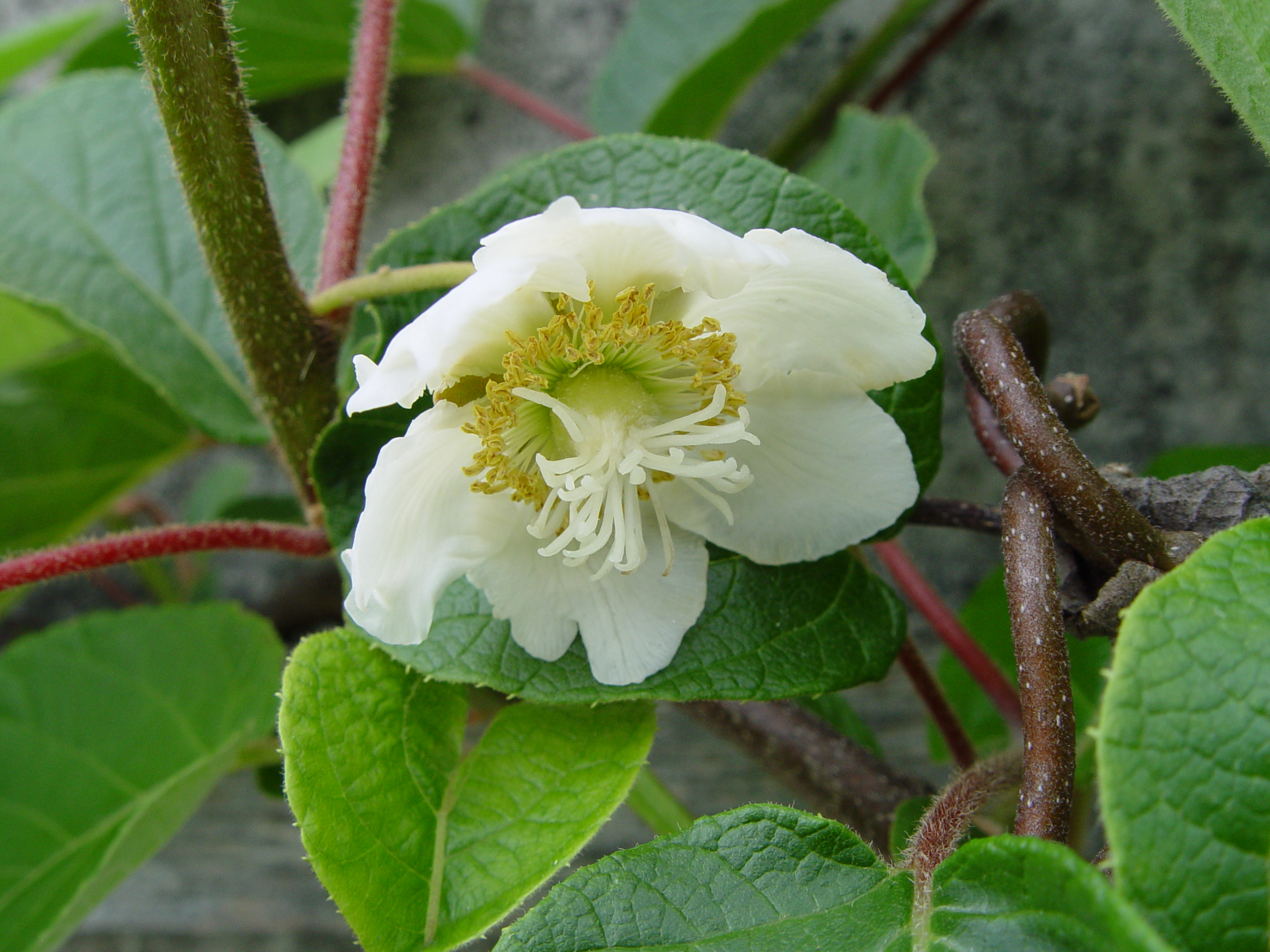
- Actinidia chinensis var. deliciosa

Scientific classification
- Kingdom: Plantae
- Clade: Tracheophytes
- Clade: Angiosperms
- Clade: Eudicots
- Clade: Asterids
- Order: Ericales
- Family: Actinidiaceae; Gilg & Werderm.

Type genus
- Actinidia Lindl.

Genera
- Actinidia; Clematoclethra; Saurauia

= Actinidiaceae =

Family of flowering plants

The Actinidiaceae are a small family of flowering plants. The family has three genera and about 360 species and is a member of the order Ericales.

== Distribution ==
They are temperate and subtropical woody vines, shrubs, and trees, native to Asia (Actinidia or kiwifruit, Clematoclethra, and Saurauia) and Central America and South America (Saurauia only). Saurauia, with its 300 species, is the largest genus in this family. Although now confined to Asia and tropical Central and South America, evidence indicates in the past the family had a wider distribution. The now extinct genus Parasaurauia is thought to have belonged to the Actinidiaceae and lived in North America during the early Campanian.

== Characteristics ==
The plants are usually small trees or shrubs, or sometimes vines (Actinidia). The alternate, simple, spiral leaves have serrated or entire margins. They lack stipules or are minutely stipulated. They are often beset with rather flattened bristles.

The flowers grow solitary or are aggregated in terminal cymes, with free sepals and petals. Except for members of the genus Clematoclethra which have 10 stamens, the stamens are numerous and originally attached at the back. They invert just before the flower starts expanding, so their bases become apical.

The plants may be dioecious, monoecious, or hermaphroditic. The fruit is usually a berry, such as the edible kiwifruit, a cultivar from the genus Actinidia.

== Evidence supporting placement within the Ericales ==
Before genetic evidence appeared in the last 10 years, the placement of the Actinidiaceae within the Ericales was highly controversial. The USDA Plants Database, a resource considered authoritative, still places the Actinidaceae within the Theales, an order which has been shown not to be monophyletic. Placement of the Actinidiaceae within the Ericales has been strongly supported recently by genetic evidence, and contrary to previous thought, it is not a basal member of the Ericales. Multiple studies using genetic evidence now firmly place the Actinidiaceae in the Ericoid clade, a monophyletic group consisting of the Ericaceae, the Cyrillaceae, the Clethraceae, the Sarraceniaceae, and the Roridulaceae. Further genetic evidence points to the Actinidiaceae being sister to the Roridulaceae, with the Roridulaceae and Sarraceniaceae, forming another, smaller, monophyletic group.

== Evidence supporting monophyly of the Actinidiaceae ==
What genera were to be placed in the Actinidiaceae before recent genetic and micromorphological studies emerged was highly controversial. Before recent evidence, the genus Sladenia was often placed within the Actinidiaceae. Also, Saurauia was sometimes considered its own family. Thus, before more detailed studies started, two to four genera could be placed within the Actinidiaceae. Micromorphological characters have confirmed that Sladenia does not belong in the Actinidiaceae. Furthermore, biological characteristics of the cells, and molecular evidence have confirmed the three genera currently circumscribed in the Actinidiaceae, Clematoclethra, Saurauia, and Actinidia, do indeed form a monophyletic group.
