= List of plants used for smoking =

Various plants are used around the world for smoking due to various chemical compounds they contain and the effects of these chemicals on the human body. This list contains plants that are smoked, rather than those that are used in the process of smoking or in the preparation of the substance.

== A–D ==
- Abies procera
- Achillea millefolium
- Acorus calamus
- Adiantum capillus-veneris
- Adiantum pedatum
- Alnus rubra
- Anaphalis margaritacea
- Angelica atropurpurea
- Angelica breweri
- Apocynum androsaemifolium
- Aralia racemosa
- Arbutus menziesii
- Arctostaphylos alpina
- Arctostaphylos nevadensis
- Arctostaphylos patula
- Arctostaphylos pungens
- Arctostaphylos rubra
- Arctostaphylos uva-ursi
- Artemisia californica
- Aster macrophyllus
- Aster novae-angliae
- Atriplex lentiformis
- Banksia dentata
- Banksia integrifolia
- Banksia marginata
- Bidens palustris
- Bidens pilosa
- Bidens tripartita
- Blumea balsamifera
- Boswellia papyrifera
- Boswellia sacra
- Boswellia serrata
- Brugmansia arborea
- Brugmansia aurea
- Brugmansia insignis
- Brugmansia sanguinea
- Brugmansia suaveolens
- Bulnesia sarmientoi
- Bursera bipinnata
- Bursera copallifera
- Bursera graveolens
- Bursera jorullensis
- Bursera simaruba
- Calea zacatechichi
- Calendula officinalis
- Callicarpa americana
- Callicarpa cana
- Callicarpa formosana
- Callitris gracilis
- Calomeria amaranthioides
- Calotropis gigantea
- Calotropis procera
- Camellia japonica
- Camellia oleifera
- Camellia reticulata
- Camellia sasanqua
- Camellia sinensis
- Camellia taliensis
- Canarium schweinfurthii
- Cannabis indica
- Cannabis ruderalis
- Cannabis sativa
- Capsicum annuum
- Capsicum baccatum
- Capsicum pubescens
- Carica papaya
- Carpesium abrotanoides
- Carpesium cernuum
- Carphephorus odoratissimus
- Carphephorus paniculatus
- Catha edulis
- Cecropia hololeuca
- Cecropia mexicana
- Cedrus deodara
- Cedrus libani
- Centaurea cyanus
- Centaurea diffusa
- Cestrum nocturnum
- Cestrum parqui
- Chamaecyparis nootkatensis
- Chamaecyparis obtusa
- Chamaemelum nobile
- Chelidonium majus
- Chromolaena odorata
- Chrysothamnus nauseosus
- Chrysothamnus viscidiflorus
- Cichorium intybus
- Cinnamomum burmanni
- Cinnamomum cambodianum
- Cinnamomum cassia
- Cinnamomum glanduliferum
- Cinnamomum verum
- Cissus quadrangularis
- Cissus nymphaeifolia
- Cissus rotundifolia
- Cistus ladanifer
- Citrus aurantium
- Citrus bergamia
- Citrus limon
- Citrus maxima
- Citrus medica
- Citrus myrtifolia
- Citrus reticulata
- Citrus sinensis
- Clematis columbiana
- Clematis glycinoides
- Clematis ligusticifolia
- Clematis virginiana
- Clematis viridiflora
- Clematis vitalba
- Clerodendrum indicum
- Clerodendrum inerme
- Clusia rosea
- Codariocalyx motorius
- Coffea arabica
- Coffea canephora
- Coffea excelsa
- Coffea liberica
- Coffea stenophylla
- Combretum glutinosum
- Combretum imberbe
- Combretum quadrangulare
- Commiphora africana
- Commiphora erythraea
- Commiphora gileadensis
- Commiphora guidottii
- Commiphora myrrha
- Commiphora opobalsamum
- Commiphora wightii
- Conyza incana
- Conyza podocephala
- Conyza scabrida
- Cornus amomum
- Cornus canadensis
- Cornus kousa
- Cornus oblonga
- Cornus racemosa
- Cornus rugosa
- Cornus sericea
- Cornus stricta
- Cornus walteri
- Corydalis aurea
- Corydalis flavula
- Corydalis solida
- Corymbia aspera
- Corymbia calophylla
- Corymbia eximia
- Crataegus crus-galli
- Crataegus douglasii
- Crataegus laevigata
- Crataegus monogyna
- Crataegus pinnatifida
- Crotalaria incana
- Crotalaria juncea
- Crotalaria laburnifolia
- Crotalaria punctata
- Croton dichogamus
- Croton eluteria
- Croton flavens
- Croton flocculosus
- Croton gratissimus
- Croton macrostachyus
- Croton pseudopulchellus
- Croton texensis
- Cupressus funebris
- Cylindropuntia echinocarpa
- Cylindropuntia spinosior
- Cymbopogon citratus
- Cymbopogon nardus
- Cytisus multiflorus
- Cytisus nigricans
- Cytisus scoparius
- Dacryodes edulis
- Dacryodes klaineana
- Daniellia oliveri
- Datura stramonium
- Delphinium glaucum
- Delphinium menziesii
- Delphinium nudicaule
- Dendranthema morifolium
- Desfontainia spinosa
- Desmanthus illinoensis
- Desmanthus leptolobus
- Desmodium adscendens
- Desmodium pulchellum
- Desmodium racemosum
- Desmodium tiliaefolium
- Dictyoloma incanescens
- Digitalis thapsi
- Diospyros melanoxylon
- Diplopterys cabrerana
- Dipterocarpus tubinatus
- Dipteryx odorata
- Dolomiaea costus
- Dolomiaea macrocephala
- Dracaena cinnabari
- Dracaena draco
- Dracaena tamaranae
- Drimys winteri
- Dryobalanops aromatica
- Dryopteris expansa
- Dryopteris filix-mas
- Duboisia hopwoodii
- Duboisia leichhardtii
- Duboisia myoporoides
- Dutaillyea drupacea
- Dutaillyea oreophila
- Dysphania graveolens

== E–L ==
- Echinacea angustifolia
- Echinacea pallida
- Echinacea purpurea
- Echinocereus salm-dyckianus
- Echinocereus triglochidiatus
- Eclipta prostrata
- Encelia farinosa
- Englerophytum magalismontanum
- Englerophytum natalense
- Entada rheedei
- Ephedra nevadensis
- Ephedra sinica
- Ephedra viridis
- Epilobium angustifolium
- Equisetum arvense
- Equisetum hyemale
- Eremophila glabra
- Eremophila longifolia
- Eremophila maculata
- Eremophila mitchellii
- Erigeron canadensis
- Erigeron philadelphicus
- Eriodictyon angustifolium
- Eriodictyon californicum
- Eriodictyon crassifolium
- Eriodictyon traskiae
- Eriodictyon trichocalyx
- Eriogonum fasciculatum
- Eriogonum inflatum
- Eriogonum umbellatum
- Erythrina zeyheri
- Erythroxylum coca
- Erythroxylum ipadu
- Erythroxylum novogranatense
- Erythroxylum spruceanum
- Eschscholzia caespitosa
- Eschscholzia californica
- Eschscholzia glyptosperma
- Eschscholzia lobbii
- Eschscholzia minutiflora
- Eschscholzia parishii
- Eucalyptus camaldulensis
- Eucalyptus cinerea
- Eucalyptus citriodora
- Eucalyptus dives
- Eucalyptus globulus
- Eucalyptus papuana
- Eucommia ulmoides
- Eumachia montana
- Eurybia macrophylla
- Exocarpos cupressiformis
- Exocarpos latifolius
- Fagonia arabica
- Fagonia cretica
- Fagonia indica
- Fagus grandifolia
- Fagus orientalis
- Fagus sylvatica
- Ferula assa-foetida
- Ferula communis
- Ferula foetida
- Ferula gummosa
- Ferula jaeschkeana
- Ferula moschata
- Ferula rubricaulis
- Fokienia hodginsii
- Genista monspessulana
- Genista tinctoria
- Glycyrrhiza glabra
- Glycyrrhiza lepidota
- Glycyrrhiza uralensis
- Gnaphalium obtusifolium
- Gnaphalium uliginosum
- Goniothalamus macrophyllus
- Goniothalamus malayanus
- Goniothalamus sesquipedalis
- Goniothalamus scortechinii
- Goniothalamus tapis
- Goniothalamus uvarioides
- Greenwayodendron suaveolens
- Grevillea stenobotrya
- Grevillea striata
- Grewia bicolor
- Grewia flavescens
- Grewia villosa
- Grindelia camporum
- Grindelia hirsutula
- Grindelia robusta
- Grindelia squarrosa
- Guiera senegalensis
- Gutierrezia microcephala
- Gutierrezia sarothrae
- Hedychium spicatum
- Heimia parvifolia
- Heimia salicifolia
- Helichrysum aureonitens
- Helichrysum caespititium
- Helichrysum decorum
- Helichrysum dregeanum
- Helichrysum epapposum
- Helichrysum foetidum
- Helichrysum gymnocomum
- Helichrysum herbaceum
- Helichrysum italicum
- Helichrysum kirkii
- Helichrysum litoreum
- Helichrysum natalitium
- Helichrysum nudifolium
- Helichrysum odoratissimum
- Helichrysum petiolare
- Helichrysum stenopterum
- Helleborus niger
- Helleborus orientalis
- Hierochloe hirta
- Hierochloe odorata
- Humulus lupulus
- Humulus scandens
- Hymenaea courbaril
- Hymenaea davisii
- Hymenaea oblongifolia
- Hymenaea verrucosa
- Hyoscyamus muticus
- Hyoscyamus niger
- Hypericum perforatum
- Hyssopus officinalis
- Ilex aquifolium
- Ilex paraguariensis
- Ilex vomitoria
- Illicium anisatum
- Illicium griffithii
- Illicium verum
- Inula britannica
- Inula conyzae
- Inula graveolens
- Inula helenium
- Iochroma arborescens
- Ipomopsis multiflora
- Iryanthera macrophylla
- Iryanthera ulei
- Jasminum officinale
- Juniperus communis
- Juniperus excelsa
- Juniperus formosana
- Juniperus monosperma
- Juniperus occidentalis
- Juniperus osteosperma
- Juniperus scopulorum
- Juniperus squamata
- Juniperus virginiana
- Laburnum alpinum
- Laburnum anagyroides
- Lactuca canadensis
- Lactuca indica
- Lactuca saligna
- Lactuca sativa
- Lactuca serriola
- Lactuca virosa
- Lagochilus inebrians
- Larrea cuneifolia
- Larrea divaricata
- Larrea nitida
- Larrea tridentata
- Lathyrus odoratus
- Laurus nobilis
- Lavandula angustifolia
- Lavandula latifolia
- Leonotis leonurus
- Leonotis nepetifolia
- Leonurus cardiaca
- Leonurus sibiricus
- Leptadenia pyrotechnica
- Leptecophylla tameiameiae
- Leptospermum petersonii
- Leptospermum scoparium
- Leptotaenia multifida
- Lespedeza bicolor
- Lespedeza capitata
- Lespedeza michx
- Leucas aspera
- Leucas martinicensis
- Liatris spicata
- Ligustrum sempervirens
- Lilium longiflorum
- Limonia acidissima
- Lippia javanica
- Liquidambar styraciflua
- Lithospermum canescens
- Lithospermum caroliniense
- Lithospermum incisum
- Lobelia cardinalis
- Lobelia chinensis
- Lobelia erinus
- Lobelia inflata
- Lobelia siphilitica
- Lobelia tupa
- Lomatium nudicaule
- Lonicera albiflora
- Lonicera japonica
- Lycium pallidum
- Lycopodium clavatum
- Lyonia ovalifolia

== M–R ==
- Madia glomerata
- Matricaria chamomilla
- Melaleuca alternifolia
- Melilotus albus
- Melilotus officinalis
- Melissa officinalis
- Mentha arvensis
- Mentha piperita
- Mentha spicata
- Mesembryanthemum cordifolium
- Mesembryanthemum tortuosum
- Mitragyna hirsuta
- Mitragyna speciosa
- Mucuna pruriens
- Myristica argentea
- Myristica fragrans
- Myristica malabarica
- Myoporum acuminatum
- Myoporum montanum
- Myoporum sandwicense
- Nelumbo nucifera
- Nicotiana acuminata
- Nicotiana africana
- Nicotiana attenuata
- Nicotiana glauca
- Nicotiana obtusifolia
- Nicotiana pauciflora
- Nicotiana quadrivalvis
- Nicotiana repanda
- Nicotiana rustica
- Nicotiana stocktonii
- Nicotiana sylvestris
- Nicotiana tabacum
- Nicotiana tomentosa
- Nymphaea alba
- Nymphaea caerulea
- Nymphaea lotus
- Nypa fruticans
- Ocimum basilicum
- Ocimum sanctum
- Origanum majorana
- Origanum vulgare
- Otostegia integrifolia
- Packera heterophylla
- Panax ginseng
- Panax quinquefolius
- Pandanus julianettii
- Papaver bracteatum
- Papaver setigerum
- Papaver somniferum
- Passiflora incarnata
- Pausinystalia johimbe
- Pechuel-loeschea leubnitziae
- Pedicularis densiflora
- Pedicularis groenlandica
- Peganum harmala
- Pelargonium graveolens
- Pentanema confertiflorum
- Petalostylis cassioides
- Petalostylis labicheoides
- Petasites frigidus
- Petasites hybridus
- Petroselinum crispum
- Phellodendron amurense
- Philodendron fragrantissimum
- Phlegmariurus phlegmaria
- Phoradendron californicum
- Phoradendron juniperinum
- Phyllanthus maderaspatensis
- Phyllanthus rufuschaneyi
- Phyllodium pulchellum
- Phyllogeiton discolor
- Phyllogeiton zeyheri
- Pilocarpus organensis
- Pilosella officinarum
- Pinus echinata
- Pinus serotina
- Pinus yunnanensis
- Piper auritum
- Piper cubeba
- Piper guineense
- Piper methysticum
- Pistacia atlantica
- Pistacia weinmanniifolia
- Pluchea camphorata
- Pluchea indica
- Pluchea sericea
- Plumbago arabica
- Plumeria rubra
- Pogostemon cablin
- Pogostemon heyneanus
- Prestonia amazonica
- Protium copal
- Prunus americana
- Prunus domestica
- Prunus pensylvanica
- Prunus serotina
- Prunus spinosa
- Prunus virginiana
- Pseudalbizzia inundata
- Pseudognaphalium obtusifolium
- Psychotria carthagenensis
- Psychotria colorata
- Psychotria forsteriana
- Psychotria insularum
- Psychotria poeppigiana
- Psychotria rostrata
- Psychotria rufipilis
- Psychotria viridis
- Pteridium aquilinum
- Pteridium esculentum
- Pterocarpus marsupium
- Pterocarpus santalinus
- Pulsatilla vulgaris
- Quercus infectoria
- Quercus marilandica
- Quercus robur
- Ranunculus arvensis
- Ranunculus muricatus
- Ranunculus pennsylvanicus
- Rheum officinale
- Rhizophora racemosa
- Rhus aromatica
- Rhus glabra
- Rhus trilobata
- Rosa acicularis
- Rosa canina
- Rosa centifolia
- Rosa damascena
- Rubus allegheniensis
- Rubus crataegifolius
- Rubus fruticosus
- Rubus idaeus
- Rubus laciniatus
- Rubus occidentaliss
- Rubus parvifolius
- Rubus phoenicolasius
- Rubus ursinus
- Ruta chalepensis

== S–Z ==
- Salix amygdaloides
- Salix bebbiana
- Salix discolor
- Salix exigua
- Salix humilis
- Salix lucida
- Salvia absconditiflora
- Salvia adenocaulon
- Salvia apiana
- Salvia divinorum
- Salvia dorrii
- Salvia fruticosa
- Salvia glutinosa
- Salvia officinalis
- Salvia potentillifolia
- Salvia recognita
- Salvia rosmarinus
- Salvia sonomensis
- Salvia stenophylla
- Salvia yangii
- Santalum album
- Santalum freycinetianum
- Santalum lanceolatum
- Santalum spicatum
- Saussurea costus
- Saussurea gossypiphora
- Sceletium expansum
- Sceletium strictum
- Sceletium tortuosum
- Schizostachyum brachycladum
- Schizostachyum funghomii
- Schizostachyum glaucifolium
- Schizostachyum lima
- Schizostachyum lumampao
- Scutellaria galericulata
- Scutellaria lateriflora
- Scutellaria nana
- Selaginella bryopteris
- Selaginella lepidophylla
- Senecio inaequidens
- Senecio praecox
- Senecio serratuloides
- Shorea robusta
- Sida acuta
- Sida cordifolia
- Sida rhombifolia
- Silene capensis
- Solanecio angulatus
- Solidago graminifolia
- Solidago nemoralis
- Solidago odora
- Solidago ulmifolia
- Sophora alopecuroides
- Sophora flavescens
- Sophora prostrata
- Sophora secundiflora
- Sophora tetraptera
- Sophora tonkinensis
- Stachys cretica
- Stachys germanica
- Stachys officinalis
- Styrax benzoin
- Styrax officinalis
- Symphyotrichum cordifolium
- Symphyotrichum ericoides
- Symphyotrichum lateriflorum
- Symphyotrichum novae-angliae
- Symphyotrichum praealtum
- Symphyotrichum puniceum
- Syzygium aromaticum
- Syzygium cumini
- Tagetes lucida
- Tagetes minuta
- Taraxacum erythrospermum
- Taraxacum mongolicum
- Taraxacum platycarpum
- Tarchonanthus camphoratus
- Tarchonanthus littoralis
- Tessaria absinthioides
- Tessaria integrifolia
- Tetrapterys mucronata
- Tetrapterys styloptera
- Teucrium chamaedrys
- Teucrium polium
- Teucrium scorodonia
- Teucrium veronicoides
- Theobroma cacao
- Thuja occidentalis
- Thuja plicata
- Thymus quinquecostatus
- Thymus vulgaris
- Trichocereus lamprochlorus
- Trichocereus spachianus
- Trifolium pratense
- Trifolium repens
- Trilisa odoratissima
- Trilisa paniculata
- Trixis angustifolia
- Trixis californica
- Trixis inula
- Turnera diffusa
- Tussilago farfara
- Vaccinium crassifolium
- Vaccinium parvifolium
- Vaccinium vitis-idaea
- Valeriana capensis
- Valeriana dioica
- Valeriana edulis
- Valeriana fauriei
- Valeriana jatamansi
- Valeriana officinalis
- Valeriana sitchensis
- Vanilla planifolia
- Vepris ampody
- Vepris bilocularis
- Vepris eugeniifolia
- Verbascum densiflorum
- Verbascum phlomoides
- Verbascum thapsus
- Verbena hastata
- Verbena officinalis
- Vernonia amygdalina
- Vernonia anthelmintica
- Vernonia cinerea
- Vernonia galamensis
- Vernonia natalensis
- Virola calophylla
- Virola calophylloidea
- Virola carinata
- Virola cuspidata
- Virola divergens
- Virola elongata
- Virola melinonii
- Virola michelii
- Virola multinervia
- Virola oleifera
- Virola pavonis
- Virola peruviana
- Virola rufula
- Virola sebifera
- Virola theiodora
- Virola venosa
- Vitex agnus-castus
- Vitex negundo
- Vitex trifolia
- Voacanga africana
- Voacanga thonningii
- Warburgia salutaris
- Withania somnifera
- Xylopia aethiopica
- Xylopia quintasii
- Zanthoxylum arborescens
- Zanthoxylum juniperinum
- Zanthoxylum piperitum
- Zingiber officinale
- Zinnia elegans
- Zornia latifolia
- Zygophyllum coccineum
- Zygophyllum fabago
- Zygophyllum gaetulum

== See also ==
- Changa
- Entheogenic drugs and the archaeological record
- List of Acacia species known to contain psychoactive alkaloids
- List of psychoactive plants
- List of psychoactive plants, fungi, and animals
- Dimethyltryptamine (DMT)
- Psilocybin mushrooms
- Psychoactive cacti
- The Encyclopedia of Psychoactive Plants
