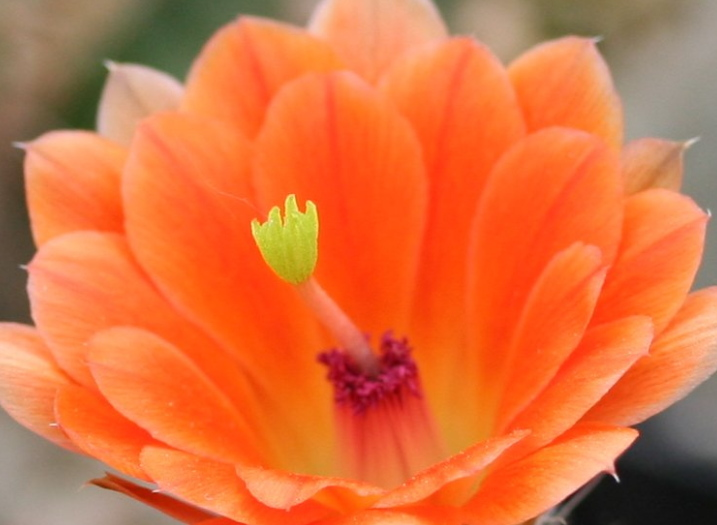

Scientific classification
- Kingdom: Plantae
- Clade: Tracheophytes
- Clade: Angiosperms
- Clade: Eudicots
- Order: Caryophyllales
- Family: Cactaceae
- Subfamily: Cactoideae
- Genus: Echinocereus
- Species: E. salm-dyckianus

Binomial name
- Echinocereus salm-dyckianus Scheer

Synonyms
- List: Echinocereus salm-dyckianus var. noctiflorus Heid 1944; Echinocereus salm-dyckianus subsp. obscuriensis (A.B.Lau) W.Blum 1994; Echinocereus salm-dyckianus f. obscuriensis (A.B.Lau) W.Rischer & Trocha 1999; Echinocereus scheeri subsp. obscuriensis (A.B.Lau) U.Guzmán 2003; Echinocereus scheeri var. obscuriensis A.B.Lau 1989

= Echinocereus salm-dyckianus =

Species of cactus

Echinocereus salm-dyckianus is a species of plant found in Mexico.

== Description ==
Echinocereus salm-dyckianus is a clumping columnar cactus with up to 97 shoots. The cylindrical stems are tapered towards their tip, 10 to 16.5 cm (3.9 to 6.5 in) long and have a diameter of 2.9 to 5.2 cm (1.1 to 2.0 in). There are seven to ten clearly blunt ribs, which are straight and slightly bumpy. There are 8 to 12 yellow to reddish brown radial spines. The two to four central spines, is terete longer and thicker than radial spines at 4 to 25 mm (0.16 to 0.98 in). The tubular-funnel-shaped flowers are pink to orange apricot with a magenta inside. They appear along the sides of the shoots from sharply pointed buds, are 8 to 10.3 cm (3.1 to 4.1 in) long and 4.4 to 6.5 cm (1.7 to 2.6 in) diameter with a hairy tube covered with white woolly hairs. This species is pollinated by hummingbirds and opens in the daytime and in the night. The fruit is round 20 to 24 mm (0.79 to 0.94 in) in length, greenish brown with white flesh and black seeds. Chromosome count is 4n=44.

== Distribution ==
Echinocereus salm-dyckianus is found in Sierra Saguaribo in eastern Sonora and Sierra Charuco, Rio Haciendita, La Bateria, Nabogame, Sierra Obscura in western Chihuahua, Mexico, growing in Sierra Madre Occidental at elevation between 1699 and 2431 meters. Plants are found growing in canyons and rocky slopes in the shade growing along with Echinocereus rigidissimus subsp. rubispinus, Echinocereus stolonifer, Echinocereus stolonifer subsp. tayopensis, and Echinocereus polyacanthus.

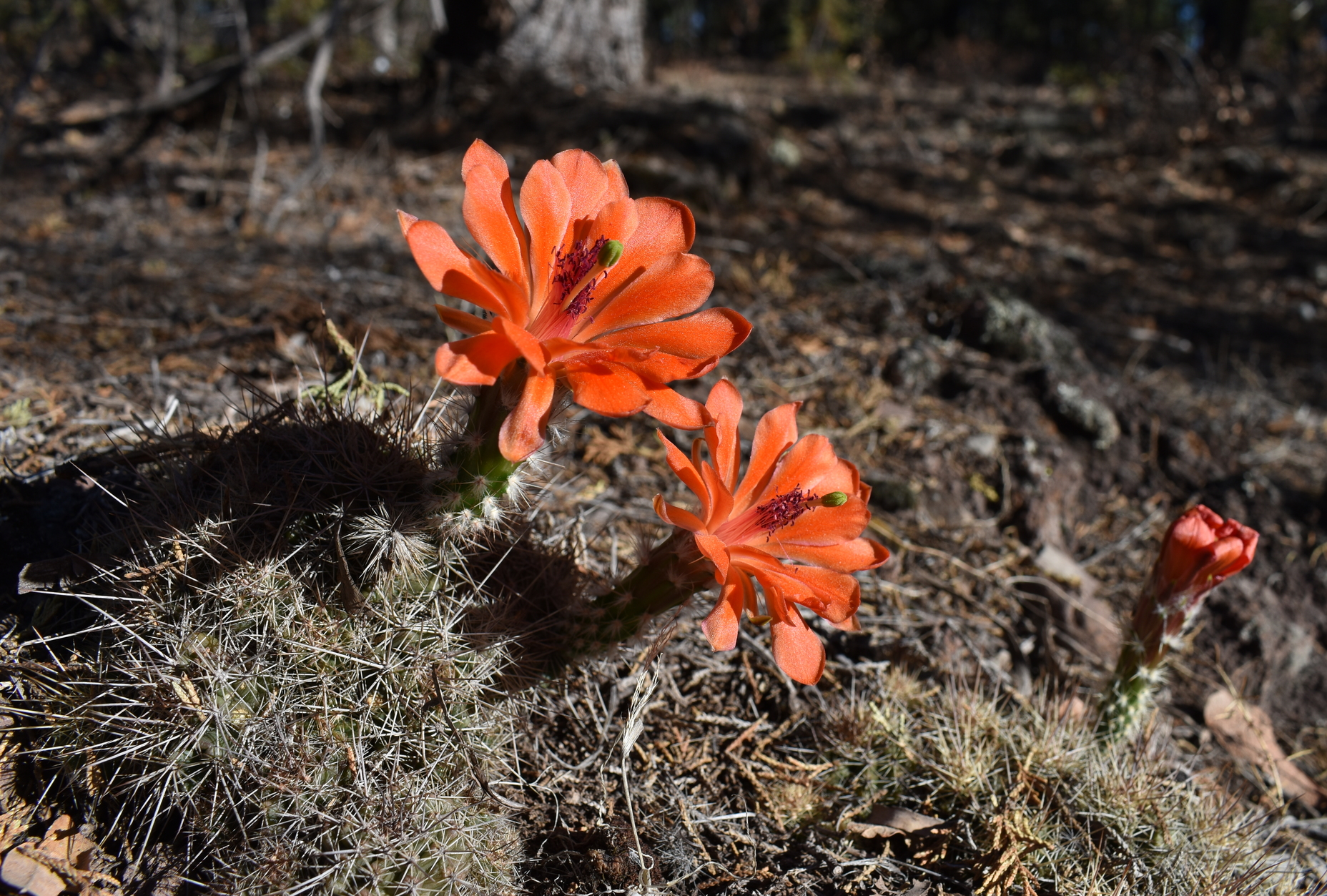
Habitat in Baiio de Los Coños, Chihuahua, Mexico

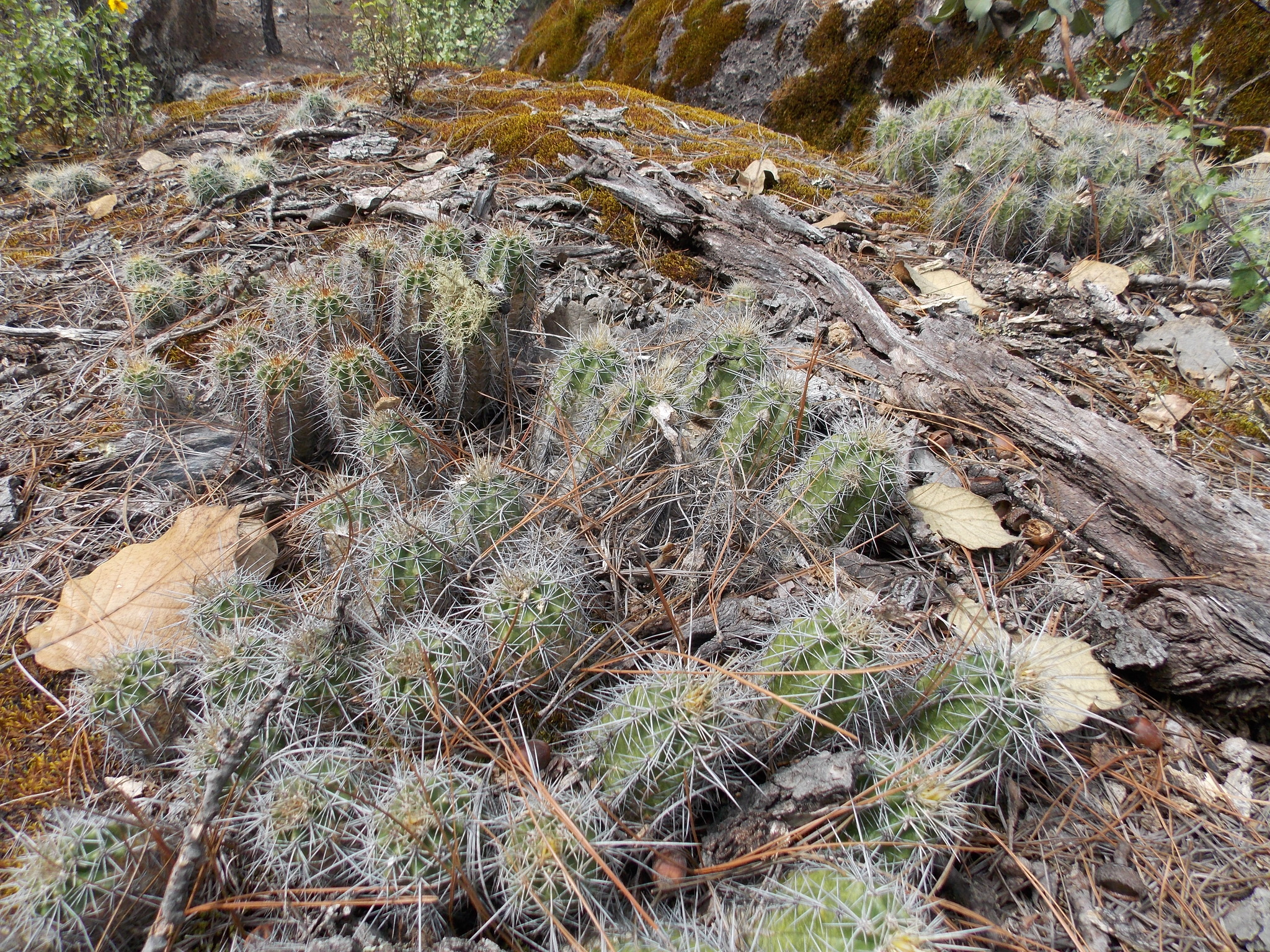
Habitat in La Gobernadora, Chihuahua, Mexico

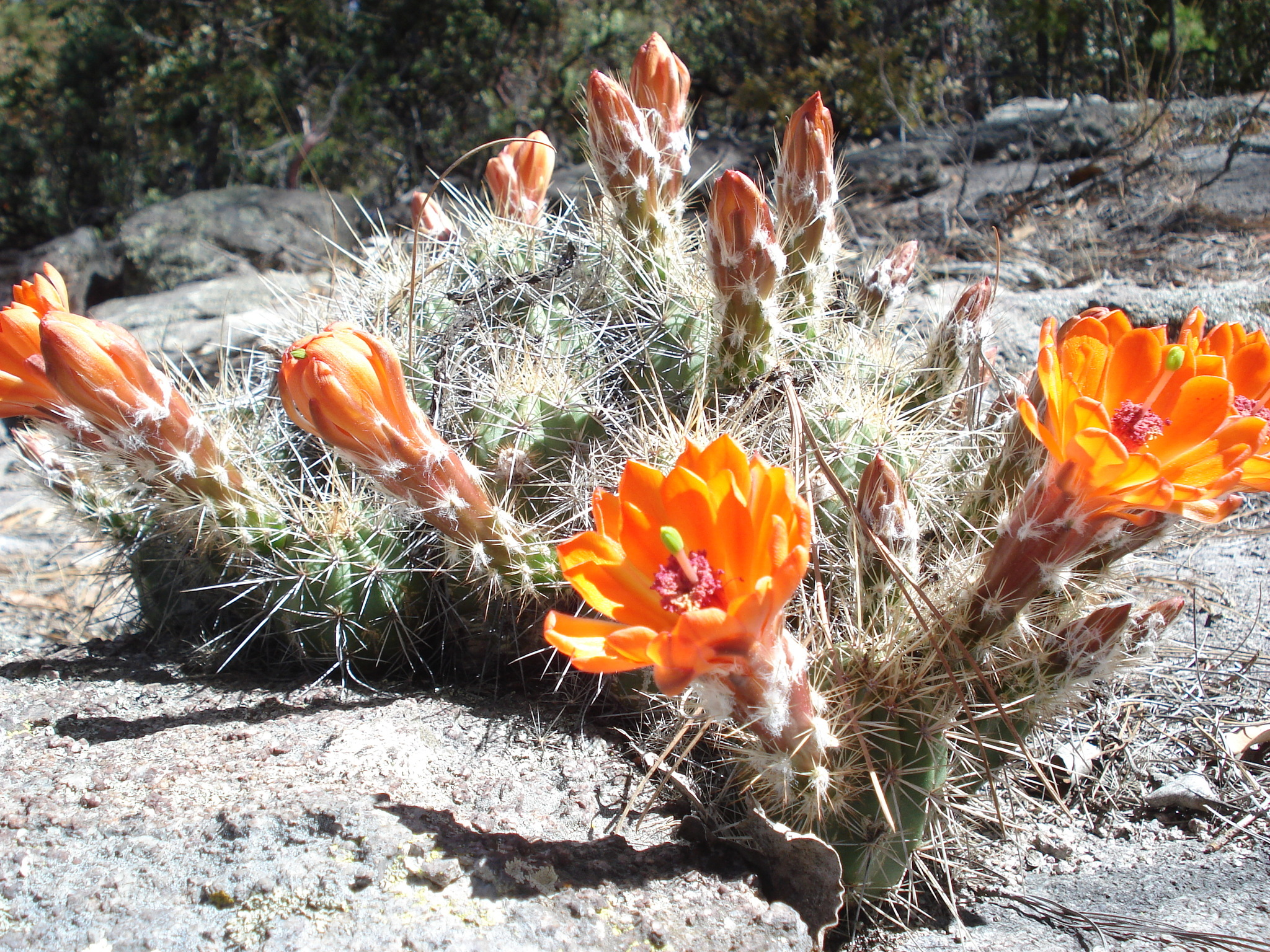
Habitat in Uruachi Municipality, Chihuahua, Mexico

== Taxonomy ==
This species was first described in 1856 by Frederick Scheer, who named it after Joseph zu Salm-Reifferscheidt-Dyck. The plant is distinguished from Echinocereus scheeri by having shorter spines and its stems.
