= Dichomeris levisella =

Scientific classification
- Domain: Eukaryota
- Kingdom: Animalia
- Phylum: Arthropoda
- Class: Insecta
- Order: Lepidoptera
- Family: Gelechiidae
- Genus: Dichomeris
- Species: D. levisella

Binomial name
- Dichomeris levisella (Fyles, 1904)

Synonyms
- Trichotaphe levisella Fyles, 1904

Species of moth

Dichomeris levisella is a moth in the family Gelechiidae. It was described by Fyles in 1904. It is found in North America, where it has been recorded from southern Quebec to southern Alberta, Nova Scotia, New Jersey, Kentucky, Michigan and Minnesota.

The forewings are brown, clouded with darker brown towards the hindmargin. There is a subterminal line of paler brown spots, bordered with black. There is a pale brown horseshoe-like mark beyond the centre of the wing. The hindwings are grey with a lighter terminal line. Adults are on wing from June to August.

The larvae feed on Aster macrophyllus, Aster cordifolius, Hieracium aurantiacum and Solidago species.
