= Artia (plant) =

Scientific classification
- Kingdom: Plantae
- Clade: Tracheophytes
- Clade: Angiosperms
- Clade: Eudicots
- Clade: Asterids
- Order: Gentianales
- Family: Apocynaceae
- Subfamily: Apocynoideae
- Tribe: Echiteae
- Genus: Artia; Guillaumin

Genus of flowering plants

Artia is a genus of plants in the family Apocynaceae, first described in 1941. The genus is endemic to New Caledonia and the nearby Loyalty Islandsin the southwestern Pacific. Artia is closely related to Parsonsia and Prestonia.

Species

- Artia amieuensis Guillaumin
- Artia balansae (Baill.) Pichon ex Guillaumin
- Artia brachycarpa (Baill.) Boiteau
- Artia francii (Guillaumin) Pichon
- Artia lifuana (Baill.) Pichon ex Guillaumin - C New Caledonia + Loyalty Islands

Formerly included

Artia penangiana (King & Gamble) Pichon, syn of Parsonsia penangiana King & Gamble
