= Prestonia rotundifolia =

Conservation status
- Endangered (IUCN 3.1)

Scientific classification
- Kingdom: Plantae
- Clade: Tracheophytes
- Clade: Angiosperms
- Clade: Eudicots
- Clade: Asterids
- Order: Gentianales
- Family: Apocynaceae
- Genus: Prestonia
- Species: P. rotundifolia

Binomial name
- Prestonia rotundifolia K. Schum. ex Woodson

Species of plant

Prestonia rotundifolia is a species of plant in the family Apocynaceae. It is native to Colombia and Ecuador. Its natural habitats are subtropical or tropical dry forests and subtropical or tropical moist lowland forests. It is threatened by habitat loss.
