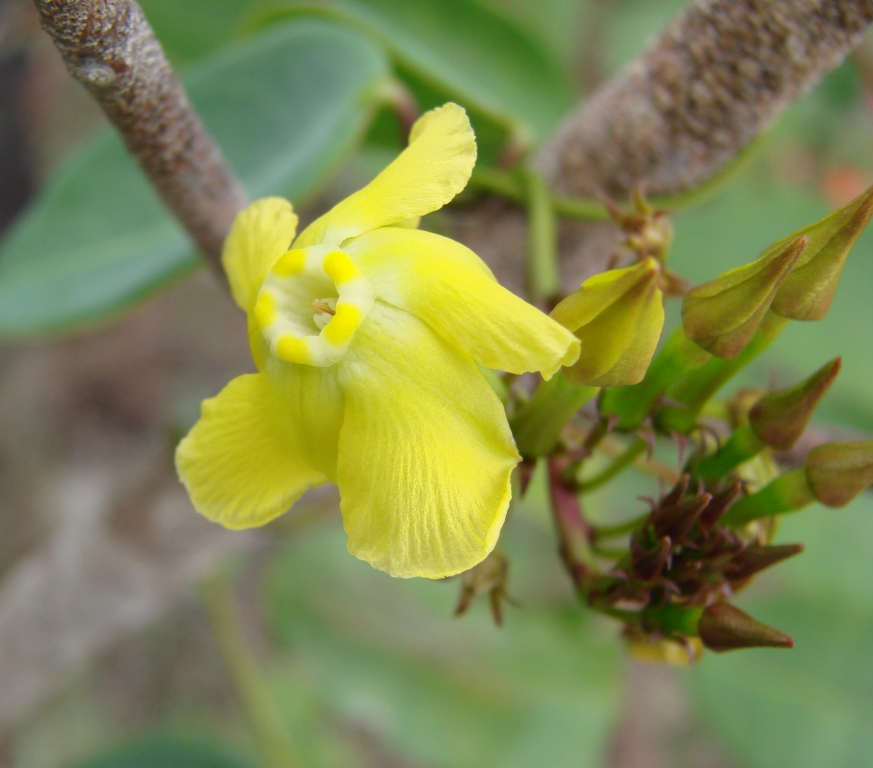
- Prestonia coalita

Scientific classification
- Kingdom: Plantae
- Clade: Embryophytes
- Clade: Tracheophytes
- Clade: Angiosperms
- Clade: Eudicots
- Clade: Asterids
- Order: Gentianales
- Family: Apocynaceae
- Subfamily: Apocynoideae
- Tribe: Echiteae
- Genus: Prestonia; R.Br.

Synonyms
- Belandra S.F.Blake; Guachamaca Grosourdy; Haemadictyon Lindl.; Rhaptocarpus Miers

= Prestonia (plant) =

Genus of plants

Prestonia is a genus of plants in the dogbane family Apocynaceae. First described as a genus in 1810, it currently includes 63 species of lianas. They are native to Mexico, Central America, South America, and the West Indies. Their flowers are tube or funnel shaped and have 5 petals, often with noticeable annular coronas. Prestonia amazonica, which is often named as a hallucinogenic plant, belongs to this genus.

== Description ==
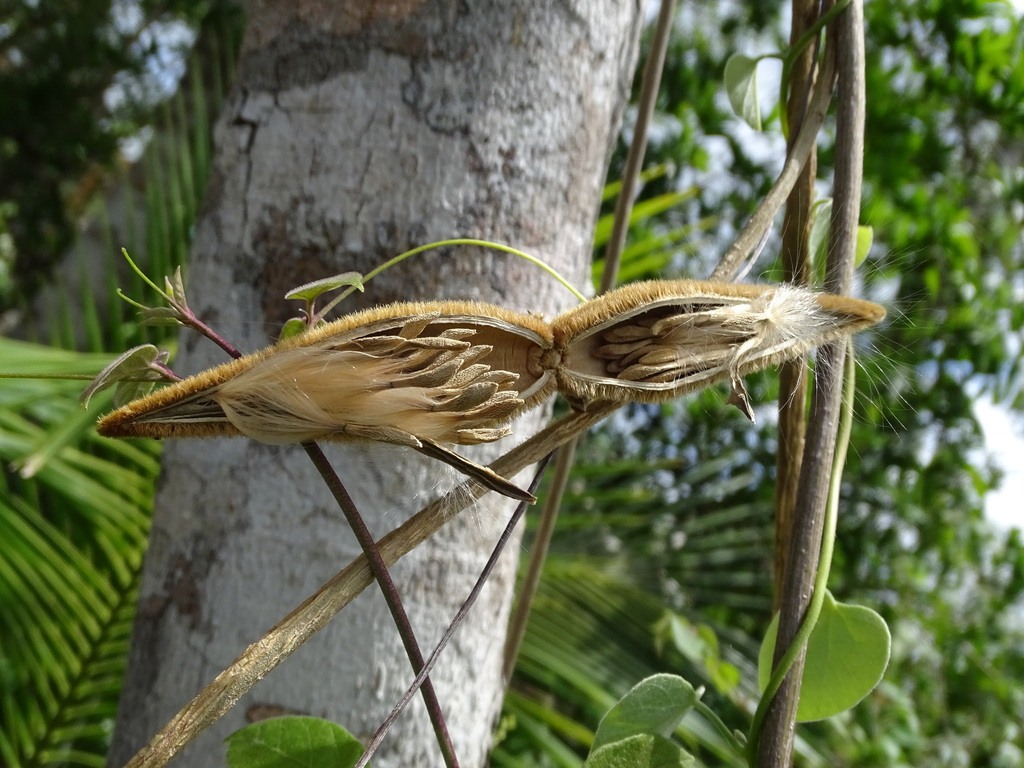
The follicular fruit of Prestonia mexicana in Mexico.

Prestonia is a genus of lianas, a type of woody vine. Their leaves lack glands and have intrapetiolar colleters that are arranged oppositely along the stem. As with many in Apocynaceae, their stems contain a latex that ranges from watery to milky. Their flowers occur in cymes that are usually axillary (occurring between the stem and the leaf) but are sometimes terminal (occurring at the ends of branches). They range from tube-shaped to funnel-shaped with usually 5 free coronal lobes and a characteristic annular corona. A single colleter is located at the inner base of their 5 sepals. Their petals range in color from cream to yellow-green, sometimes with red or purple inclusions. They have nectaries located annularly alongside their apocarpous, bicarpellate gynoecium. The fruit is a follicle that is usually smooth but is winged in some species. The seeds have tufts of hair and are truncate in shape.

== Distribution and habitat ==
Species in Prestonia can be found in the neotropics of Mexico, Central America, South America, and the West Indies. They extend as far north as northeast Mexico and as far south as northern Argentina. Colombia and Brazil have the most species with 25 and 23 known species respectively. They can be found at elevations ranging from sea level to as high as 2800m.

== Ecology ==
Limited evidence has shown bees to be possible pollinators of the genus.

In the montane rainforests of Ecuador, some members of Lepidoptera in Ithomiinae and Arctiinae have been found to engage in pharmacophagy on Prestonia amabilis. They do so in order to obtain pyrrolizidine alkaloids that can be used as a chemical defense against predators and as precursor chemicals to male pheremones.

== Taxonomy ==
The genus was first described in 1810 by botanist Robert Brown who named the genus after Dr. Charles Preston. It was not until the 1930's that it got significant attention from Robert E. Woodson, who is known to have treated the most species in the genus. It is closely related to Artia and Parsonsia.

=== Species ===
63 species are accepted.

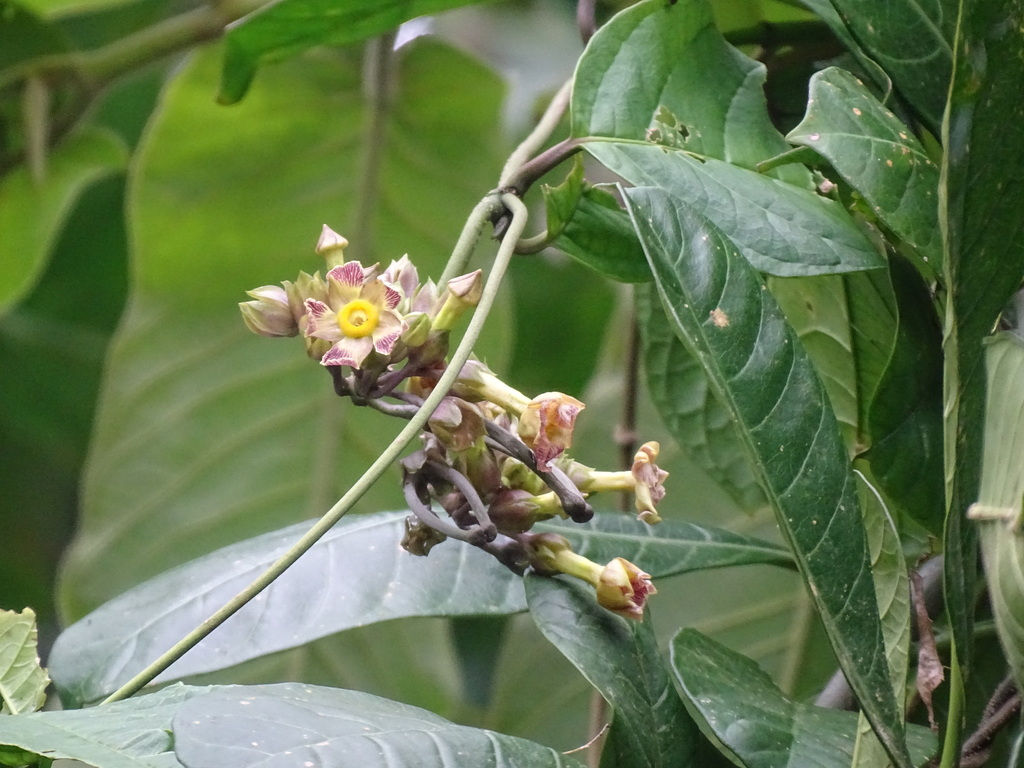
The flowers of Prestonia portobellensis in Mexico.

1. Prestonia acrensis J.F.Morales – Acre in Brazil
2. Prestonia amabilis J.F.Morales – Pastaza in Ecuador
3. Prestonia amazonica (Benth. ex Müll.Arg.) J.F.Macbr. – N Brazil
4. Prestonia annularis (L.f.) G.Don – Trinidad, N South America
5. Prestonia antioquiana J.F.Morales & Liede – Colombia
6. Prestonia bahiensis Müll.Arg. – E Brazil
7. Prestonia boliviana J.F.Morales & A.Fuentes – Chuquisaca
8. Prestonia brittonii N.E.Br. – Trinidad, Venezuela
9. Prestonia calycina Müll.Arg. – S Brazil, Paraguay, NE Argentina
10. Prestonia cayennensis (A.DC.) Pichon – N South America
11. Prestonia clandestina J.F.Morales – S Mexico
12. Prestonia coalita (Vell.) Woodson – much of South America
13. Prestonia cogolloi J.F.Morales – Antioquia in Colombia
14. Prestonia cordifolia Woodson – Peru
15. Prestonia cyaniphylla (Rusby) Woodson – Brazil, Bolivia, Paraguay, N Argentina
16. Prestonia denticulata (Vell.) Woodson – Pará, Rio de Janeiro
17. Prestonia didyma (Vell.) Woodson – E Brazil
18. Prestonia discolor Woodson – Guyana
19. Prestonia dusenii (Malme) Woodson – S Brazil
20. Prestonia exserta (A.DC.) Standl. – Trinidad, Venezuela, Colombia, Panama
21. Prestonia falcatosepala J.F.Morales – Colombia, Ecuador
22. Prestonia folsomii J.F.Morales – Colombia, Panama
23. Prestonia guianensis Gleason – Venezuela, Guyana
24. Prestonia hammelii J.F.Morales – Costa Rica
25. Prestonia haughtii Woodson – Colombia
26. Prestonia ipomaeifolia A.DC. – Panama, NW South America, Fr Guiana
27. Prestonia lacerata Woodson – Peru
28. Prestonia lagoensis (Müll.Arg.) Woodson – Brazil, Bolivia, Paraguay, Uruguay, N Argentina
29. Prestonia lauta J.F.Morales – Colombia
30. Prestonia leco A.Fuentes & J.F.Morales – La Paz in Bolivia
31. Prestonia lenticellata A.H.Gentry – Panama
32. Prestonia lindleyana Woodson – Venezuela, Colombia, Brazil
33. Prestonia longifolia (Sessé & Moc.) J.F.Morales – S Mexico, Central America, Colombia
34. Prestonia megagros (Vell.) Woodson – Venezuela, Brazil
35. Prestonia mexicana A.DC. – C + S Mexico, Central America, Colombia
36. Prestonia mollis Kunth – Panama, NW South America
37. Prestonia morilloi Markgr. – Venezuela, Colombia, Panama
38. Prestonia mucronata Rusby – northeastern Colombia
39. Prestonia occultata J.F.Morales & Cornejo – Ecuador and Peru
40. Prestonia ornata (Hoehne) J.F.Morales, M.E.Endress & Liede – Bolivia, western Brazil, and Peru
41. Prestonia papillosa (Müll.Arg.) J.F.Morales – Colombia
42. Prestonia parviflora (Benth.) Benth. & Hook.f. – Venezuela, Colombia
43. Prestonia parvifolia K.Schum. ex Woodson – Ecuador
44. Prestonia peregrina Woodson – Ecuador
45. Prestonia plumeriifolia Markgr. – Peru, NW Brazil
46. Prestonia portobellensis (Beurl.) Woodson – S Mexico to Ecuador
47. Prestonia premontana J.F.Morales – Venezuela
48. Prestonia quinquangularis (Jacq.) Spreng. – South + Central America, West Indies
49. Prestonia racemosa J.F.Morales – Peru
50. Prestonia riverae J.F.Morales – Costa Rica
51. Prestonia robusta Rusby – Peru, Bolivia
52. Prestonia rotundifolia K.Schum. ex Woodson – Colombia, Ecuador
53. Prestonia schumanniana Woodson – Ecuador
54. Prestonia seemannii Miers – N Colombia, Panama
55. Prestonia solanifolia (Müll.Arg.) Woodson – SE Brazil
56. Prestonia speciosa Donn.Sm. – Chiapas to Nicaragua
57. Prestonia succo J.F.Morales – Peru
58. Prestonia surinamensis Müll.Arg. – Colombia, N Brazil, 3 Guianas
59. Prestonia tomentosa R.Br. – tropical South America
60. Prestonia trifida Poepp.) Woodson – Costa Rica to Brazil
61. Prestonia tysonii A.H.Gentry – Panama
62. Prestonia vana Woodson – Peru
63. Prestonia vaupesana Woodson – Venezuela, Colombia

Formerly included

1. Prestonia agglutinata (Jacq.) Woodson = Echites agglutinatus Jacq.
2. Prestonia arborescens Monach. = Hylaea arborescens (Monach.) J.F.Morales
3. Prestonia caudata Woodson = Echites puntarenensis J.F.Morales
4. Prestonia contorta (M.Martens & Galeotti) Hemsl. = Laubertia contorta (M.Martens & Galeotti) Woodson
5. Prestonia erecta J.F.Morales = Rhodocalyx rotundifolius Müll.Arg.
6. Prestonia hirsuta Spreng. 1824 not Müll.Arg. 1860 = Mandevilla pavonii (A.DC.) Woodson
7. Prestonia langlassei Standl. = Laubertia contorta (M.Martens & Galeotti) Woodson
8. Prestonia leptoloba Monach. = Hylaea leptoloba (Monach.) J.F.Morales
9. Prestonia peruviana Spreng. = Mandevilla glandulosa (Ruiz & Pav.) Woodson
10. Prestonia riedelii (Müll.Arg.) Markgr. = Rhodocalyx riedelii (Müll.Arg.) J.F.Morales, M.E.Endress & Liede
11. Prestonia woodsoniana (Monach.) A.H.Gentry = Echites woodsonianus Monach.

== Uses ==
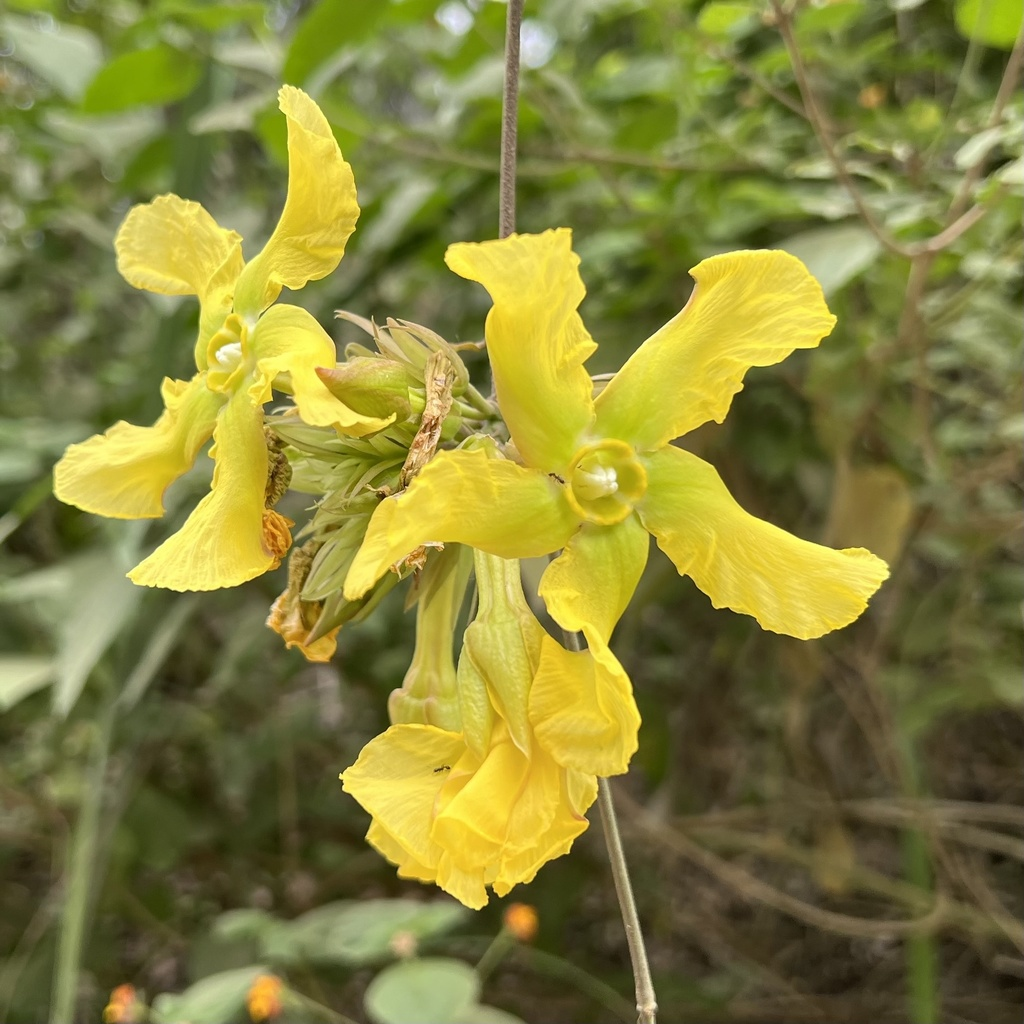
Flowering Prestonia mollis in Ecuador.

The fresh roots, stems, and leaves of Prestonia mollis are known to be used by people in southern Ecuador (Loja and Zamora-Chinchipe provinces) to disinfect, to treat wounds, and to treat cancer.

Prestonia amazonica is often named as a hallucinogenic plant however the evidence for this is contested. In the mid 1850's botanist Richard Spruce noted the species to be a possible admixture while he was studying caapi, a psychedelic drink more commonly known as ayahuasca. It was the opinion of the ethnobotanist, Richard E. Schultes, that the designation of Prestonia amazonica as a hallucinogenic plant has little evidence behind it beyond Spruce's observations. Thus far, only one chemical analysis has ever been performed on the species in the 1950's. While it found evidence of DMT, a hallucinogenic compound, the validity of the source of the sample analyzed has been called into question. No further chemical analyses have been published.
