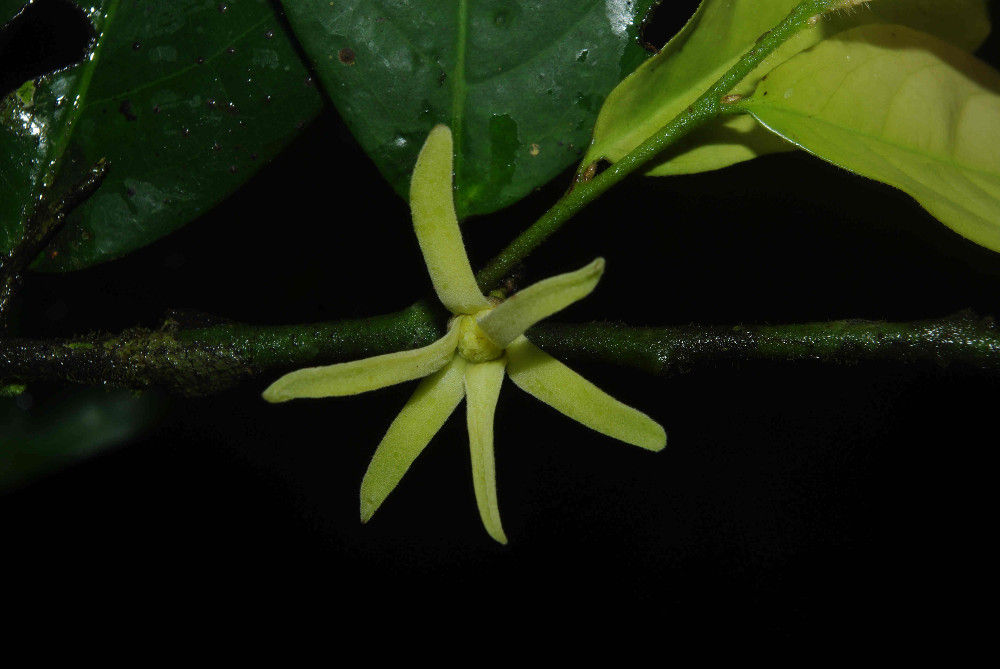
- Greenwayodendron suaveolens

Scientific classification
- Kingdom: Plantae
- Clade: Embryophytes
- Clade: Tracheophytes
- Clade: Spermatophytes
- Clade: Angiosperms
- Clade: Magnoliids
- Order: Magnoliales
- Family: Annonaceae
- Tribe: Piptostigmateae
- Genus: Greenwayodendron; Verdc.

= Greenwayodendron =

Genus of flowering plants

Greenwayodendron is a genus of flowering plants in the family Annonaceae. It includes six species native to western, central, and eastern tropical Africa.

== Species ==
Six species are accepted.

- Greenwayodendron gabonicum (Pellegr. ex Le Thomas) Lissambou & Couvreur
- Greenwayodendron glabrum Lissambou, O.J.Hardy & Couvreur
- Greenwayodendron littorale Lissambou, Dauby & Couvreur
- Greenwayodendron oliveri (Engl.) Verdc.
- Greenwayodendron suaveolens (Engl. & Diels) Verdc.
- Greenwayodendron usambaricum (Verdc.) Lissambou, O.J.Hardy & Couvreur
