= Combretol =

- Chemical structure of combretol

Names
- IUPAC name 5-Hydroxy-3,3′,4′,5′,7-pentamethoxyflavone
- Preferred IUPAC name 5-Hydroxy-3,7-dimethoxy-2-(3,4,5-trimethoxyphenyl)-4H-1-benzopyran-4-one
- Other names 3,7,3',4',5'-pentamethylmyricetin

Identifiers
CAS Number	5084-19-5
3D model (JSmol)	Interactive image
ChEBI	CHEBI:70005
ChEMBL	ChEMBL518300
ChemSpider	21131195
PubChem CID	12303802
UNII	2G3ZF4VTE5
CompTox Dashboard (EPA)	DTXSID601029316
- InChI: InChI=1S/C20H20O8/c1-23-11-8-12(21)16-13(9-11)28-18(20(27-5)17(16)22)10-6-14(24-2)19(26-4)15(7-10)25-3/h6-9,21H,1-5H3 Key: SUNUQCQIFHHEOW-UHFFFAOYSA-N; InChI=1/C20H20O8/c1-23-11-8-12(21)16-13(9-11)28-18(20(27-5)17(16)22)10-6-14(24-2)19(26-4)15(7-10)25-3/h6-9,21H,1-5H3 Key: SUNUQCQIFHHEOW-UHFFFAOYAT
- SMILES: COC1=CC(=C2C(=C1)OC(=C(C2=O)OC)C3=CC(=C(C(=C3)OC)OC)OC)O

Properties
Chemical formula	C_{20}H_{20}O_{8}
Molar mass	388.36 g/mol
- Except where otherwise noted, data are given for materials in their standard state (at 25 °C [77 °F], 100 kPa). verify (what is ?) Infobox references

Combretol is an O-methylated flavonol, a type of flavonoid. It is the 3,7,3',4',5'-O-methylation of myricetin and can be extracted from Combretum quadrangulare and from Rhodomyrtus tomentosa.
