= Prestonia parvifolia =

Conservation status
- Critically Endangered (IUCN 3.1)

Scientific classification
- Kingdom: Plantae
- Clade: Tracheophytes
- Clade: Angiosperms
- Clade: Eudicots
- Clade: Asterids
- Order: Gentianales
- Family: Apocynaceae
- Genus: Prestonia
- Species: P. parvifolia

Binomial name
- Prestonia parvifolia (K. Schum. ex Woodson)

Species of plant

Prestonia parvifolia is a species of plant in the family Apocynaceae. It is endemic to Ecuador. Its natural habitat is subtropical or tropical dry forests. It is threatened by habitat loss.

== Habitat ==
Ecology: A vine or liana of dry coastal semi-deciduous forest(0–500 m).
