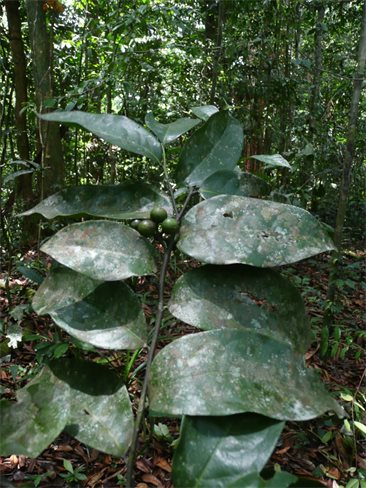

Conservation status
- Least Concern (IUCN 3.1)

Scientific classification
- Kingdom: Plantae
- Clade: Embryophytes
- Clade: Tracheophytes
- Clade: Spermatophytes
- Clade: Angiosperms
- Clade: Magnoliids
- Order: Magnoliales
- Family: Annonaceae
- Genus: Greenwayodendron
- Species: G. oliveri

Binomial name
- Greenwayodendron oliveri (Engl.) Verdc.

Synonyms
- Artabotrys oliveri (Engl.) Roberty; Polyalthia acuminata Oliv.; Polyalthia oliveri Engl.

= Greenwayodendron oliveri =

Species of flowering plant

Greenwayodendron oliveri is a species of flowering plant in the genus Greenwayodendron, and a member of the Annonaceae family, described by Bernard Verdcourt. It is a tree native to west tropical Africa. According to Catalogue of Life Greenwayodendron oliveri does not have any known subspecies.

== Distribution ==
Greenwayodendron oliveri is native to west tropical Africa, from Guinea to Sierra Leone, Liberia, Côte d'Ivoire, Ghana, and Nigeria. It is native to rainforests.

== Medicine ==
This plant has fibres and is used for bark medicine.
