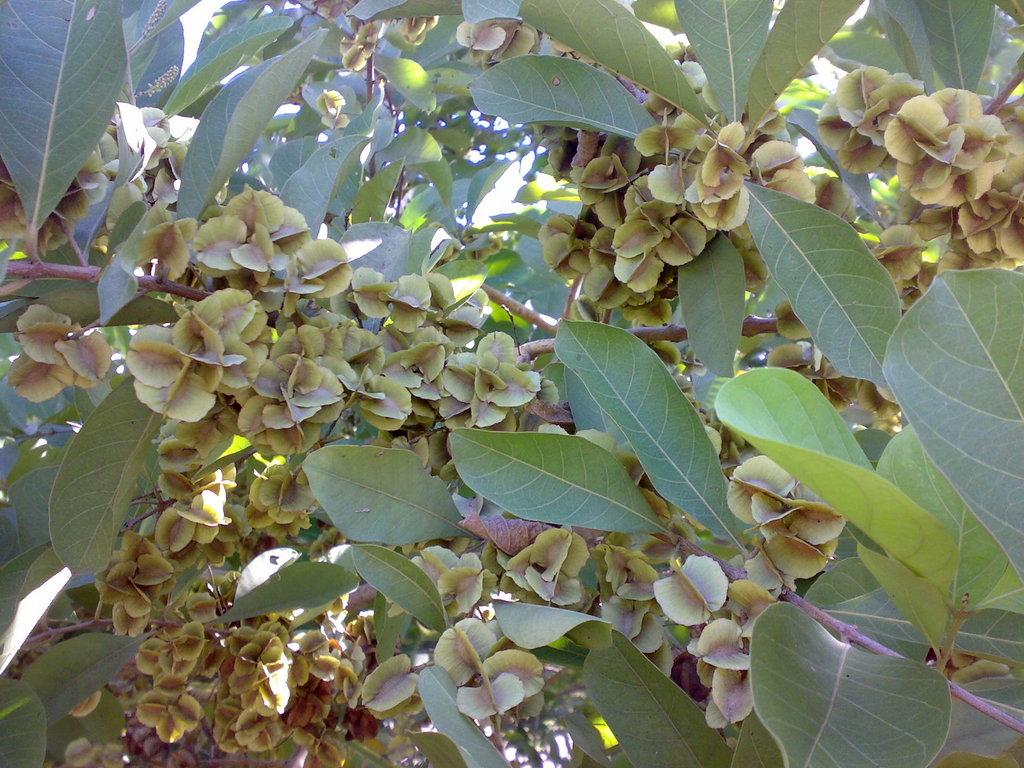

Conservation status
- Least Concern (IUCN 3.1)

Scientific classification
- Kingdom: Plantae
- Clade: Tracheophytes
- Clade: Angiosperms
- Clade: Eudicots
- Clade: Rosids
- Order: Myrtales
- Family: Combretaceae
- Genus: Combretum
- Species: C. quadrangulare

Binomial name
- Combretum quadrangulare Kurz

Synonyms
- Combretum attenuatum Wall.

= Combretum quadrangulare =

Species of flowering plant

Combretum quadrangulare, or commonly known with its Thai name sakae naa (สะแกนา) is a species of flowering plant in the family Combretaceae. It is a small tree that grouws up to 10 m high. The tree grows wildly or is planted in Vietnam, Cambodia, Laos, Myanmar and Thailand.

The tree is planted along the banks of rivers or arroyos for firing. It is found throughout Thailand especially in open, wet places. Studies of the chemical constituents of this plant have revealed that alcoholic and other extracts from the roots and seeds could kill earthworms.

== Description ==
Tree, 5-10m high: young branchlets acutely quad-rangular or very narrowly quadrialate. Leaves simple, opposite, elliptic or obovate, 3–8 cm wide, 6–16 cm long: petiole acutely ridged. Inflorescence in terminal and axillary spike; flower small, yellowish white. Fruit dry, thinly quadrialate: seed brownish red, ellipsoid, 4- angled.

== Chemistry ==
Combretol is an O-methylated flavonol, found in C. quadrangulare. The plant also contains the gallic acid derivative, 1-O-galloyl-6-O-(4-hydroxy-3,5-dimethoxy)benzoyl-beta-D-glucose.
