= Callicarpa cana =

Callicarpa cana is a species name previously used to describe two different species of beautyberry:

- Callicarpa cana L. is accepted as Callicarpa candicans var. candicans (Burm.f.) Hochr.
- Callicarpa cana Gamble is accepted as Callicarpa macrophylla Vahl
