= Prestonia amazonica =

Scientific classification
- Kingdom: Plantae
- Clade: Tracheophytes
- Clade: Angiosperms
- Clade: Eudicots
- Clade: Asterids
- Order: Gentianales
- Family: Apocynaceae
- Genus: Prestonia
- Species: P. amazonica

Binomial name
- Prestonia amazonica J.F.Macbr.

Synonyms
- Haemadictyon amazonicum Benth. ex Müll.Arg.

Species of plant

Prestonia amazonica is a hallucinogenic plant native to the Amazon rainforest. This plant is cited in Louisiana State Act 159.
