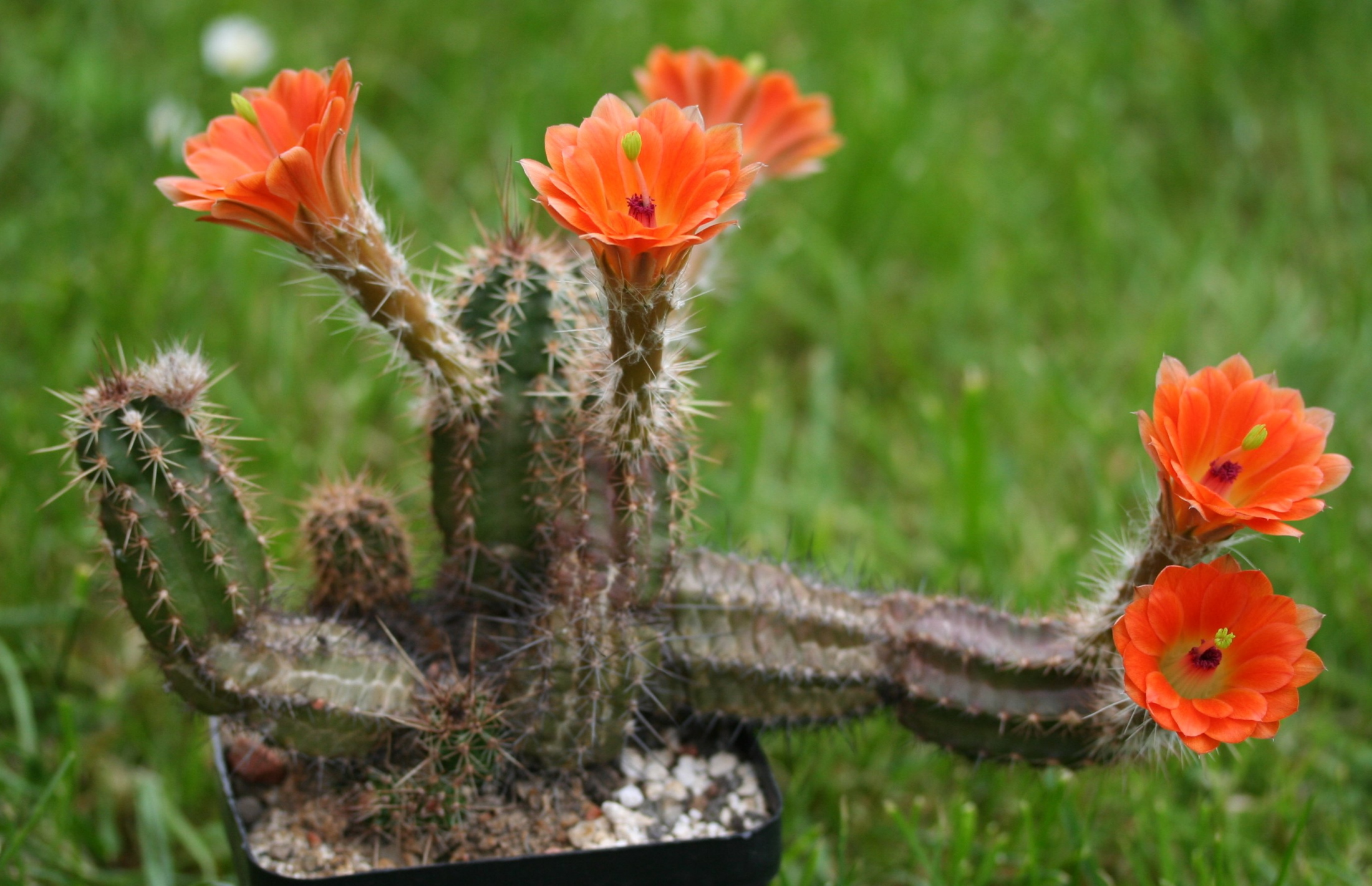
- In bloom
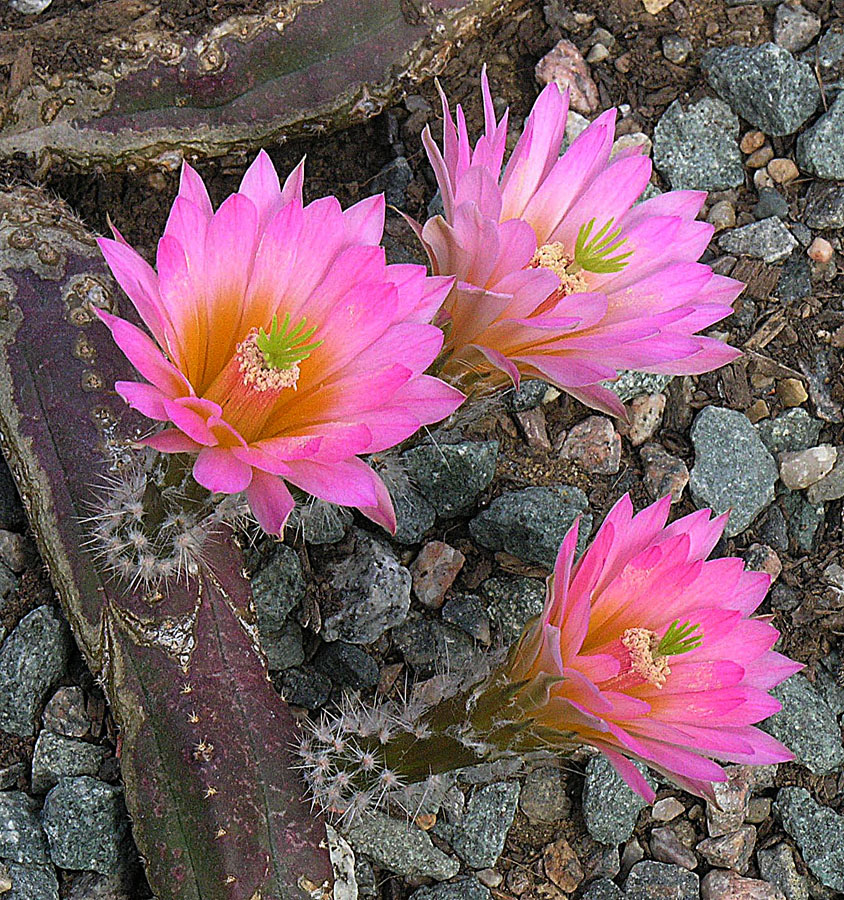
- A specimen with pink petals

Conservation status
- Least Concern (IUCN 3.1)

Scientific classification
- Kingdom: Plantae
- Clade: Embryophytes
- Clade: Tracheophytes
- Clade: Angiosperms
- Clade: Eudicots
- Order: Caryophyllales
- Family: Cactaceae
- Subfamily: Cactoideae
- Genus: Echinocereus
- Species: E. scheeri

Binomial name
- Echinocereus scheeri (Salm-Dyck) Scheer

Synonyms
- List: Cereus salm-dyckianus Hemsl.; Cereus scheeri Salm-Dyck; Echinocereus chaletii W.Rischer; Echinocereus cucumis Werderm.; Echinocereus gentryi Clover; Echinocereus klapperi W.Blum; Echinocereus rischeri (R.C.Römer) W.Rischer; Echinocereus salmianus K.Schum.; Echinocereus sanpedroensis Raudonat & W.Rischer; Echinocereus scheeri subsp. paridensis W.Rischer & Trocha; Echinocereus scheeri subsp. rischeri R.C.Römer

= Echinocereus scheeri =

Species of flowering plant

Echinocereus scheeri is a species of hedgehog cactus in the family Cactaceae, native to northern Mexico. With its dramatic offsets, it has gained the Royal Horticultural Society's Award of Garden Merit.

== Description ==
Echinocereus scheeri usually grows with numerous shoots sprouting from its base and sometimes forms upright but usually splayed or creeping groups. The cylindrical shoots are tapered towards their tip. They are 10 to 70 cm (3.9 to 27.6 in) long and have a diameter of 1.5 to 4 cm (0.59 to 1.57 in). There are four to ten clearly blunt ribs, which are straight and occasionally tuberous on their sides. The up to four white to brownish central spines, which can also be missing, are 0.1 to 2 cm (0.039 to 0.787 in) long. The usually 6 to 13 white to light brown radial spines are 1 to 7 mm (0.039 to 0.276 in) long.

The tubular-funnel-shaped flowers are pink to orange to scarlet. They appear along the sides of the shoots from sharply pointed buds, are 6 to 12 cm (2.4 to 4.7 in) long and reach 4 to 6 cm (1.6 to 2.4 in) in diameter. The short egg-shaped fruits are bright green and contain white pulp. They tear open lengthwise and are covered with slightly sloping thorns. Chromosome count is 2n=22.

=== Subspecies ===
The following subspecies are currently accepted:

Image	Subspecies	Distribution
	Echinocereus scheeri subsp. chaletii (W.Rischer) N.P.Taylor	Chihuahua
	Echinocereus scheeri subsp. cucumis (Werderm.) W.Blum & Oldach	Sonora
	Echinocereus scheeri subsp. gentryi (Clover) N.P.Taylor	eastern Sonora to western Chihuahua
	Echinocereus scheeri subsp. scheeri	E. Sonora to W. Durango

== Distribution ==
Echinocereus scheeri is distributed in the Mexican states of Sonora, Sinaloa, Chihuahua and Durango.

== Taxonomy ==
The first description as Cereus scheeri by Joseph zu Salm-Reifferscheidt-Dyck was published in 1850. The specific epithet scheeri honors the German trader and plant lover Frederick Scheer. Frederick Scheer placed the species in the genus Echinocereus in 1856
