= Virola michelii =

Conservation status
- Least Concern (IUCN 3.1)

Scientific classification
- Kingdom: Plantae
- Clade: Embryophytes
- Clade: Tracheophytes
- Clade: Spermatophytes
- Clade: Angiosperms
- Clade: Magnoliids
- Order: Magnoliales
- Family: Myristicaceae
- Genus: Virola
- Species: V. michelii

Binomial name
- Virola michelii Heckel (1898)

Synonyms
- Myristica melinonii Benoist (1924); Virola melinonii (Benoist) A.C.Sm. (1938)

Species of tree

Virola michelii is a species of flowering plant in the family Myristicaceae. It is a tree native to the humid tropics of northern South America, ranging from Colombia and Venezuela and the Guianas to Bolivia and central and northern Brazil.
