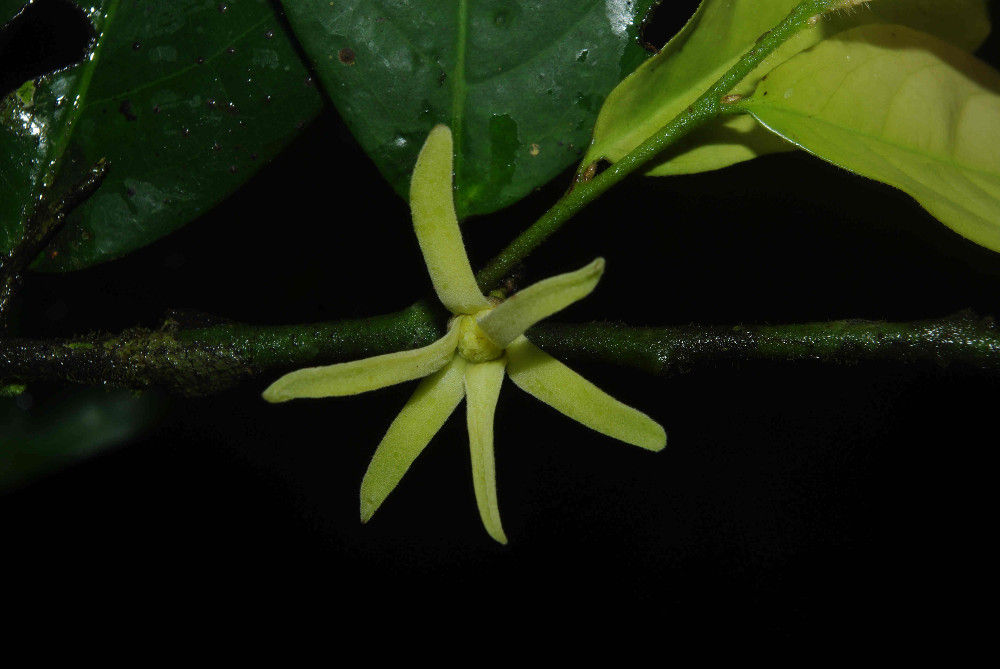

Conservation status
- Least Concern (IUCN 3.1)

Scientific classification
- Kingdom: Plantae
- Clade: Embryophytes
- Clade: Tracheophytes
- Clade: Spermatophytes
- Clade: Angiosperms
- Clade: Magnoliids
- Order: Magnoliales
- Family: Annonaceae
- Genus: Greenwayodendron
- Species: G. suaveolens

Binomial name
- Greenwayodendron suaveolens (Engl. & Diels) Verdc.

Synonyms
- Polyalthia aubrevillei Ghesq. ex Aubrév.; Polyalthia mortehanii De Wild.; Polyalthia suaveolens Engl. & Diels; Xylopia otunga Exell; Maba gossweileri Greves

= Greenwayodendron suaveolens =

Species of flowering plant

Greenwayodendron suaveolens is a species of tree in the genus Greenwayodendron, and a member of the Annonaceae family.

== Distribution ==
It is widely distributed across West and Central Africa, from Nigeria to the Democratic Republic of the Congo and Uganda.

The former variety gabonica and subspecies usambaricum are now recognized as distinct species, Greenwayodendron gabonicum and Greenwayodendron usambaricum.

== Recreational and medicinal use ==
The Aka people of Central Africa smoke the leaves, locally called "motunga," recreationally, and also prepare it into a tea. This may have an antihelmintic effect.
