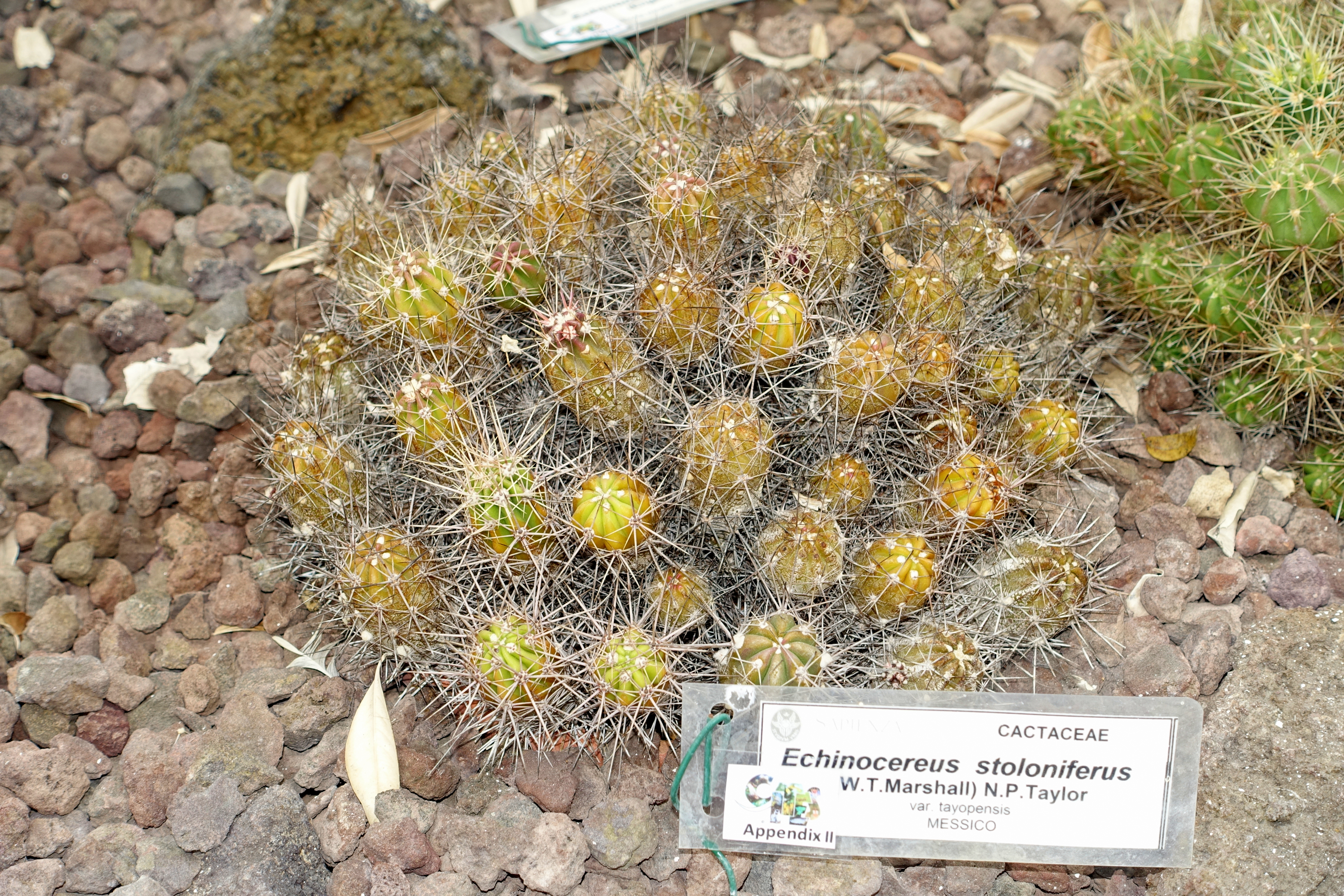

Conservation status
- Least Concern (IUCN 3.1)

Scientific classification
- Kingdom: Plantae
- Clade: Tracheophytes
- Clade: Angiosperms
- Clade: Eudicots
- Order: Caryophyllales
- Family: Cactaceae
- Subfamily: Cactoideae
- Genus: Echinocereus
- Species: E. stoloniferus

Binomial name
- Echinocereus stoloniferus W.T.Marshall

Synonyms
- Echinocereus stoloniferus W.T.Marshall, Korotkova & al. 2021

= Echinocereus stoloniferus =

Species of cactus

Echinocereus stoloniferus is a species of cactus native to Mexico.

== Description ==
Echinocereus stoloniferus typically forms colonies with numerous shoots branching below the soil surface. The deep green, egg-shaped to cylindrical shoots measure 9 to 30 centimeters in length and 5 to 8 centimeters in diameter, partially covered by thorns. They have eleven to sixteen low ribs that are slightly tuberculated. Each shoot features one to five strong central spines, brownish to gray, with the lowest spine pointing downwards, reaching up to 2.5 centimeters long. The eight to thirteen gray or whitish radial spines lie on the surface and can grow up to 1.5 centimeters long. The short, funnel-shaped flowers are bright yellow, appearing near the shoot tips, and can grow up to 7.5 centimeters long with a diameter of 7 to 10 centimeters. The reddish fruits are heavily spined.

=== Subspecies ===
There are two recognized subspecies:

Image	Scientific name	Distribution
	Echinocereus stoloniferus subsp. stoloniferus	Mexico (SE Sonora, Sinaloa)
	Echinocereus stoloniferus subsp. tayopensis (W.T.Marshall) N.P.Taylor	Mexico (E Sonora to W Chihuahua)

== Distribution ==
Echinocereus stoloniferus is found in open forests in the Mexican states of Sonora, Chihuahua, and Sinaloa.

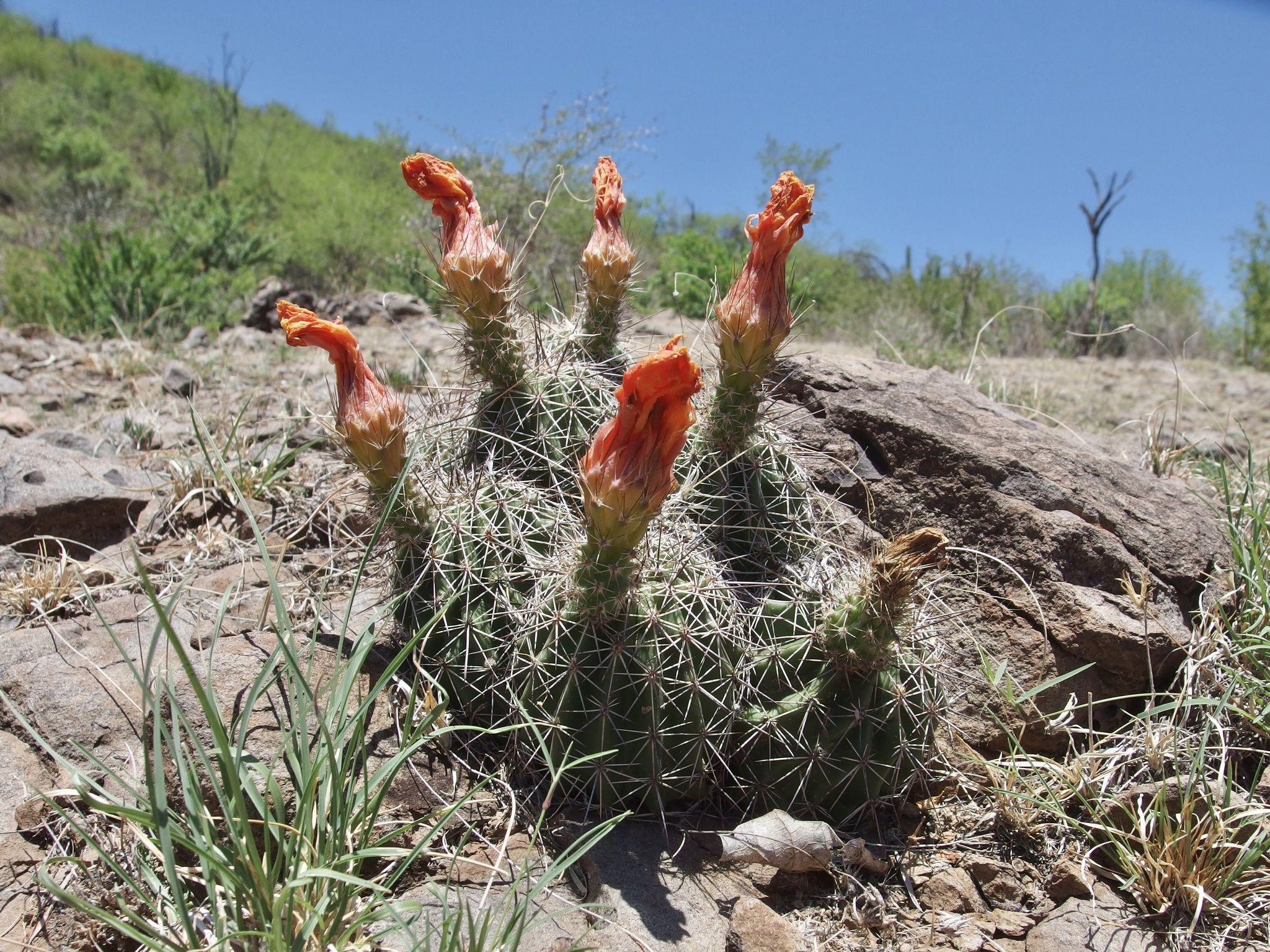
Habitat in Nácori Chico, Sonora, Mexico

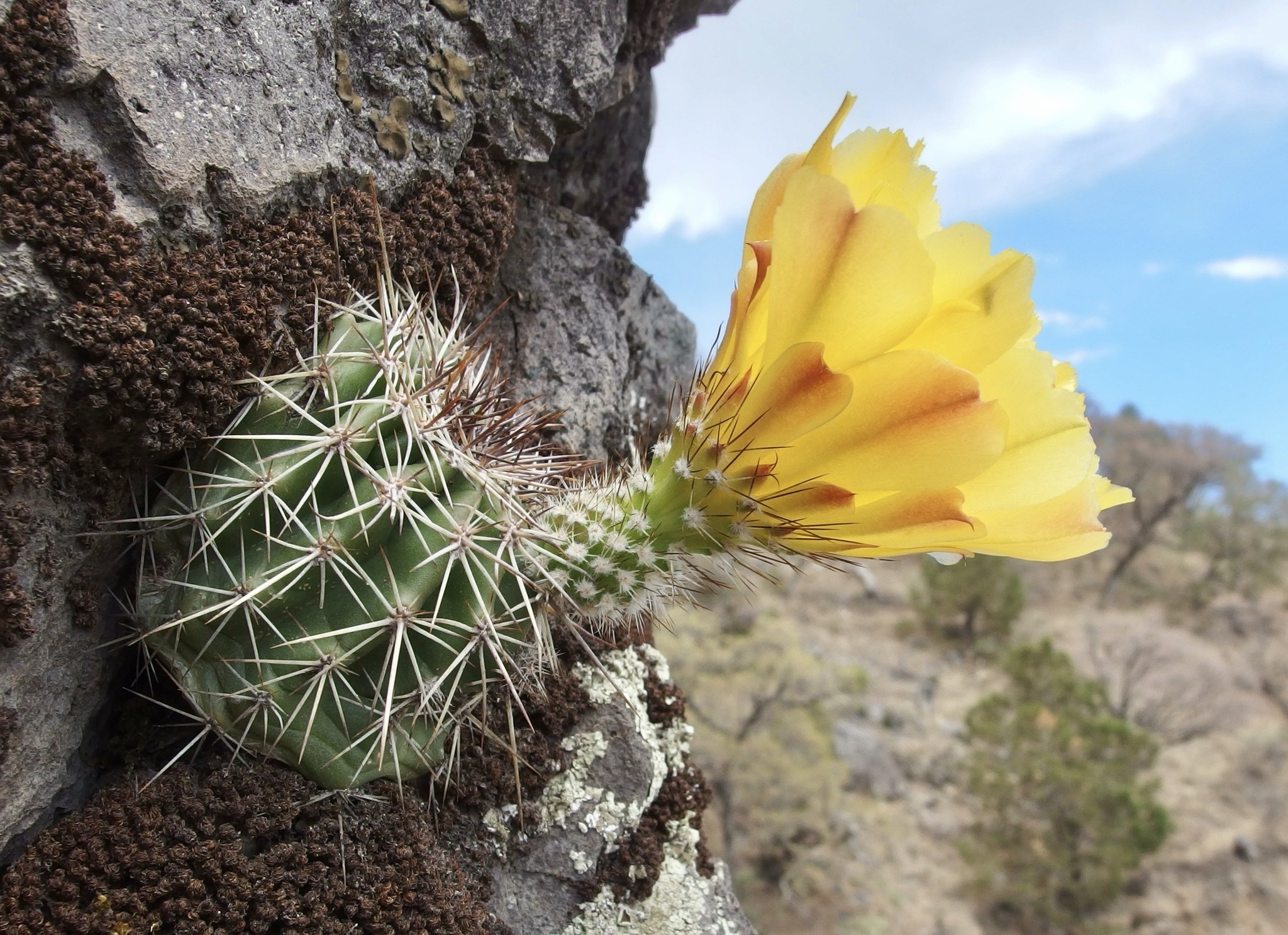
Habitat in El Rubí, Sonora, Mexico

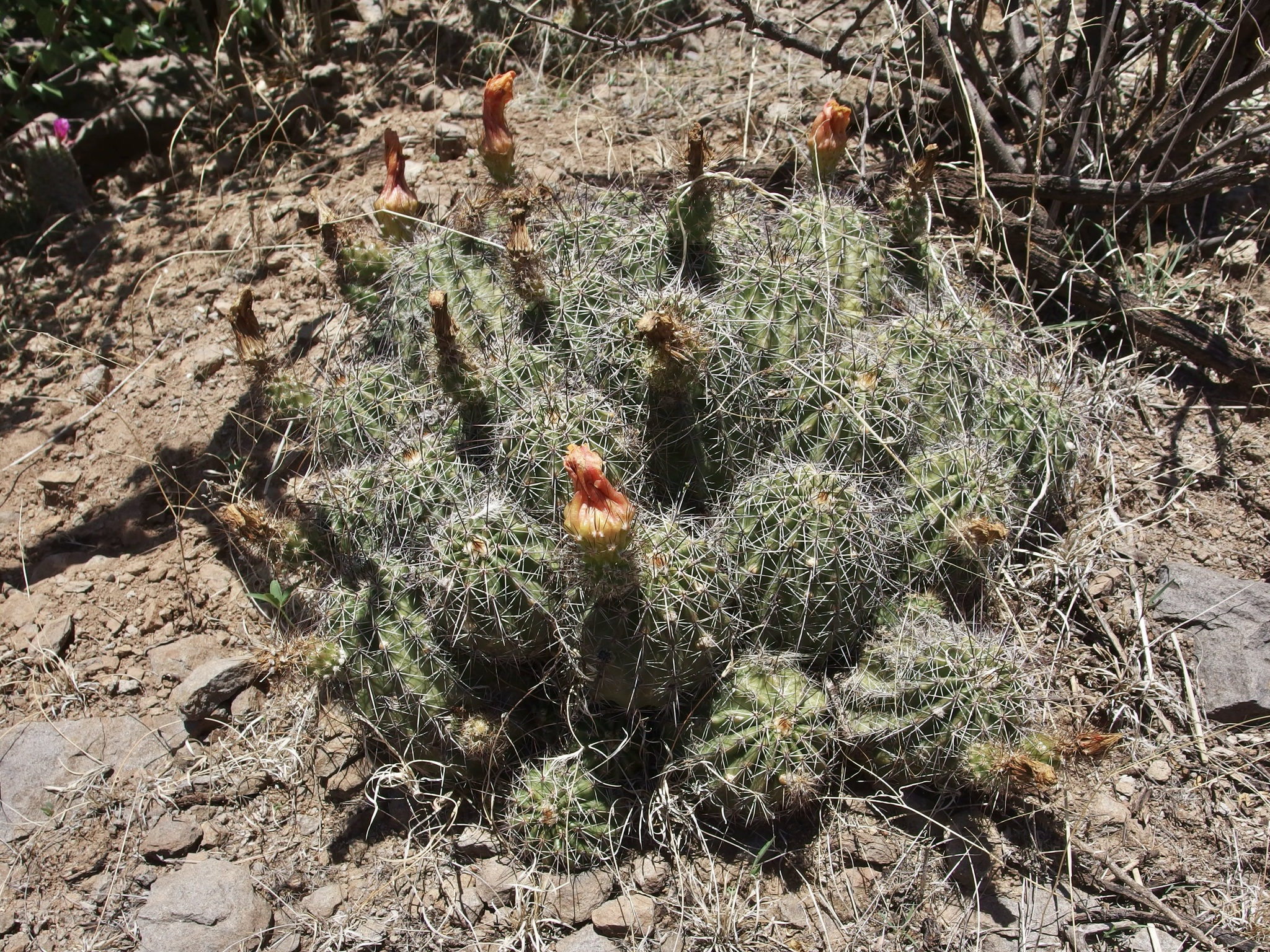
Plant growing in El Rito, Sonora, Mexico

== Taxonomy ==
First described by William Taylor Marshall in 1938, the specific epithet "stoloniferus" comes from the Latin "stoloniferus," meaning "producing runners," which refers to the species' growth habit.
