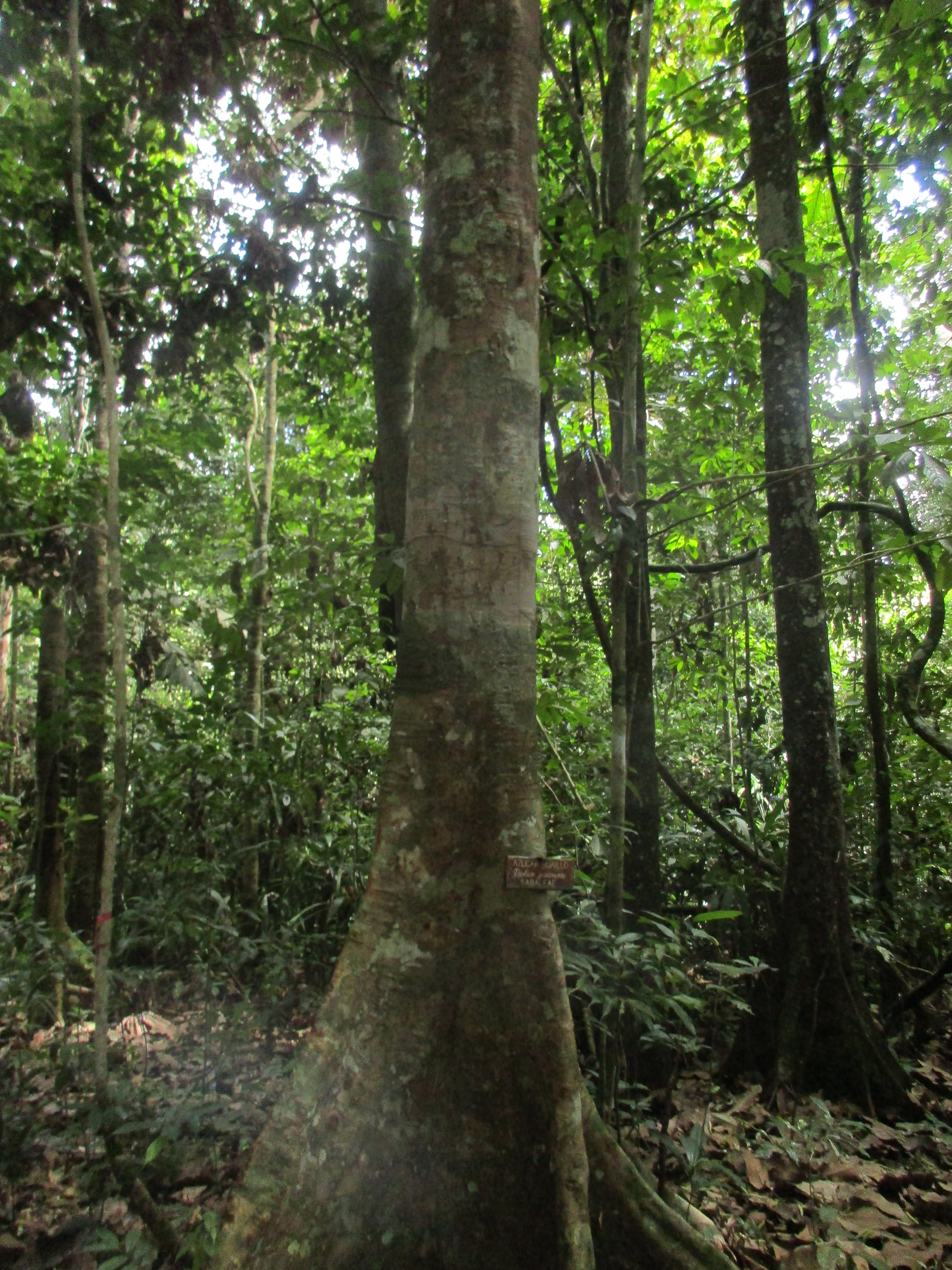
- Trunk usually has buttresses

Conservation status
- Least Concern (IUCN 3.1)

Scientific classification
- Kingdom: Plantae
- Clade: Tracheophytes
- Clade: Angiosperms
- Clade: Eudicots
- Clade: Rosids
- Order: Fabales
- Family: Fabaceae
- Genus: Hymenaea
- Species: H. oblongifolia

Binomial name
- Hymenaea oblongifolia Huber

Synonyms
- Cynometra zamorana R.E.Schult.; Hymenaea davisii Sandwith; Hymenaea palustris Ducke

= Hymenaea oblongifolia =

Species of plant

Hymenaea oblongifolia is a widespread species of flowering plant in the family Fabaceae, native to the várzea forest ecosystem of northern and western South America. A tree reaching 40 m (130 ft), it is harvested for its timber, and its edible fruit is also collected in the wild for sale. It is used as a street tree in Medellín, Colombia.

== Subtaxa ==
The following varieties are accepted:

- Hymenaea oblongifolia var. davisii (Sandwith) Y.T.Lee & Langenh. – Guyana, Venezuela
- Hymenaea oblongifolia var. latifolia Y.T.Lee & Langenh. – northeastern Brazil
- Hymenaea oblongifolia var. oblongifolia – Bolivia, Colombia, Ecuador, Guyana, northern Brazil, Peru
- Hymenaea oblongifolia var. palustris (Ducke) Y.T.Lee & Langenh. – Colombia, Guyana, northern Brazil, Peru, Venezuela
