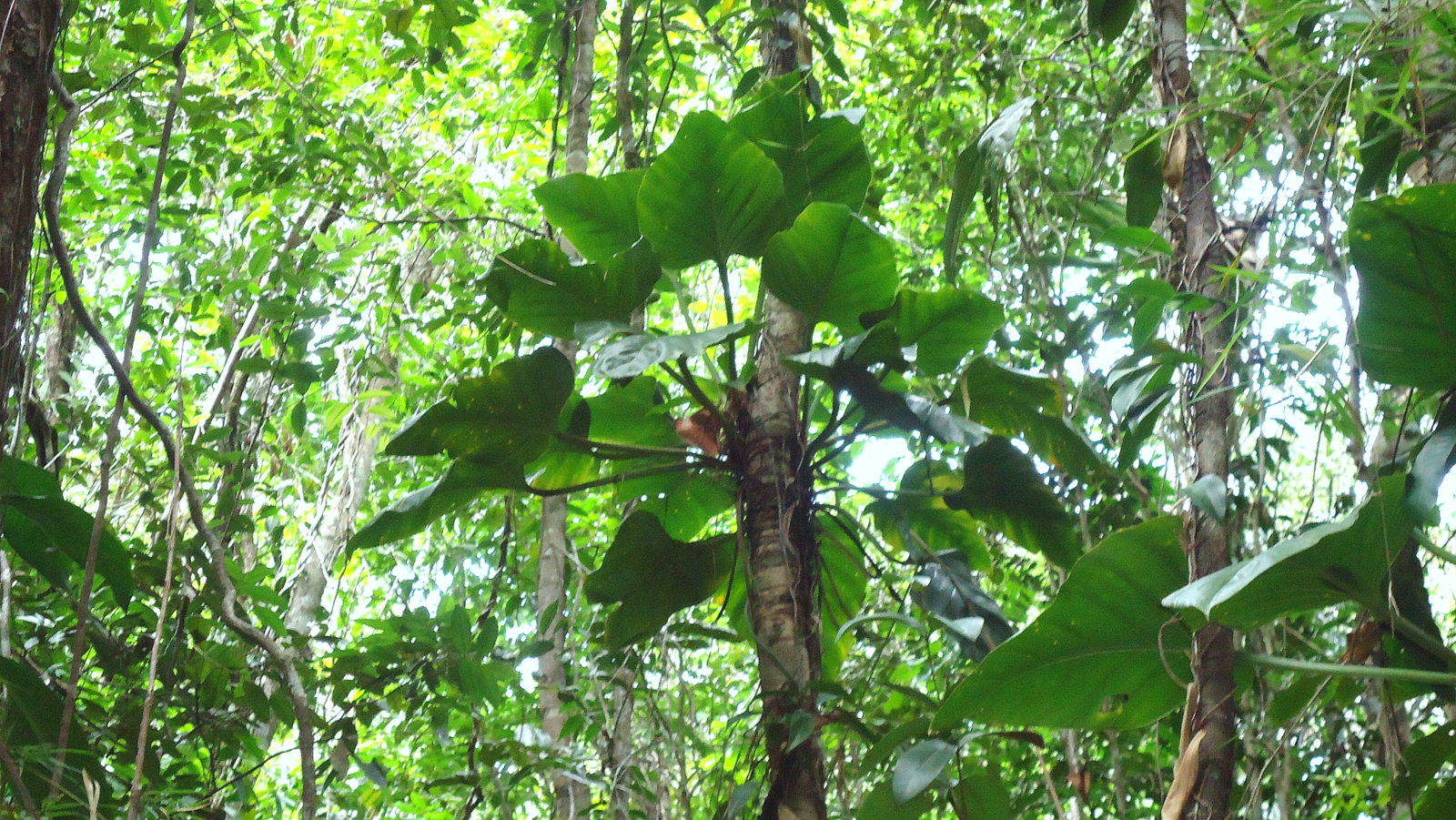
- Up a tree in Bahia , Brazil
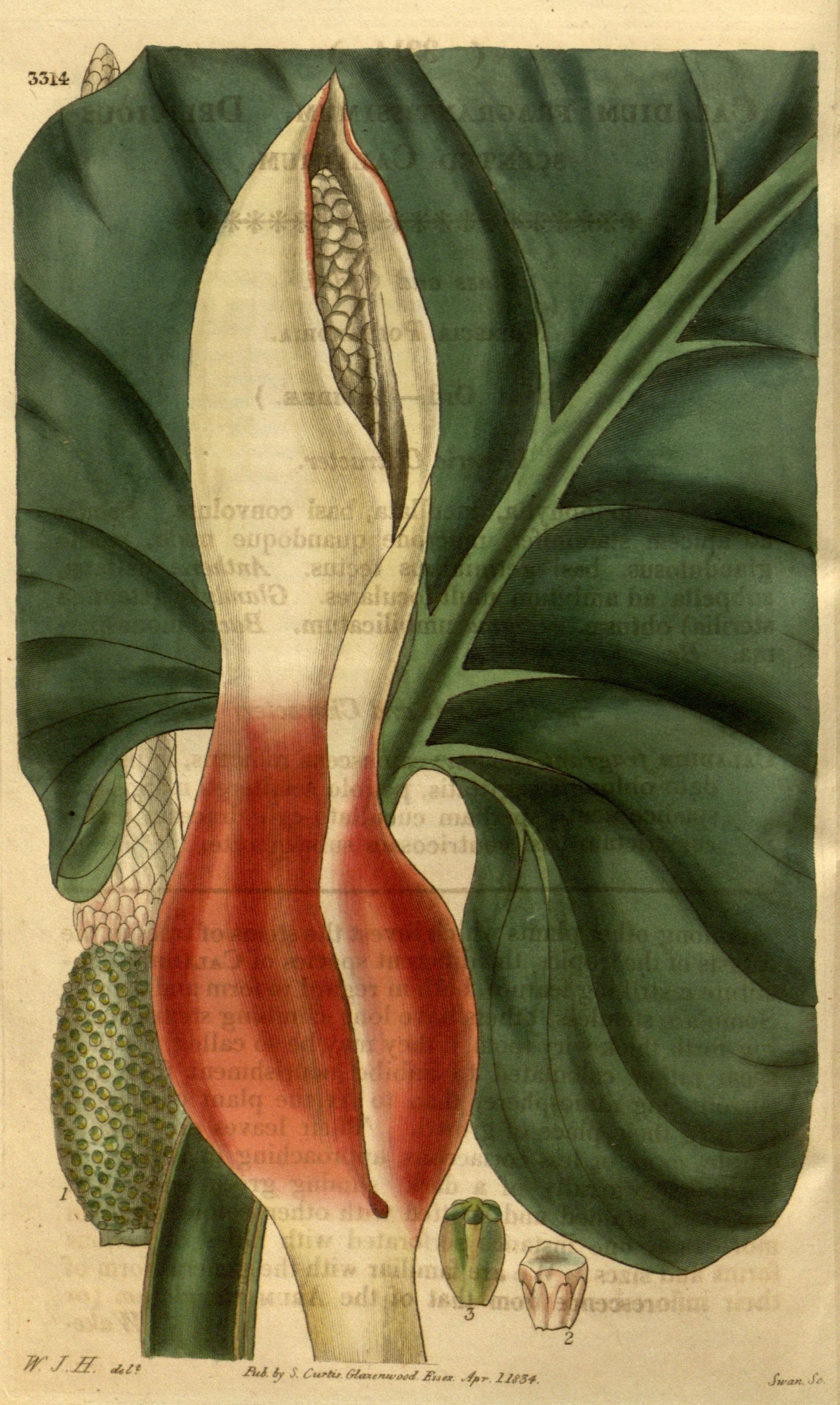
- Botanical illustration

Scientific classification
- Kingdom: Plantae
- Clade: Tracheophytes
- Clade: Angiosperms
- Clade: Monocots
- Order: Alismatales
- Family: Araceae
- Genus: Philodendron
- Species: P. fragrantissimum

Binomial name
- Philodendron fragrantissimum (Hook.) G.Don

Synonyms
- List: Arosma obtusifolia Raf.; Caladium fragrantissimum Hook.; Philodendron accrescens Simmonds; Philodendron brevilaminatum Schott; Philodendron clementis C.Wright; Philodendron demerarae Gleason; Philodendron latipes K.Koch & Augustin; Philodendron poeppigii Schott

= Philodendron fragrantissimum =

Species of plant

Philodendron fragrantissimum, the fragrant philodendron or shortstem philodendron, is a species of flowering plant in the family Araceae. It is native to the New World Tropics. An epiphyte, an essential oil is extracted from its roots and used for bathing and as a fumigant.

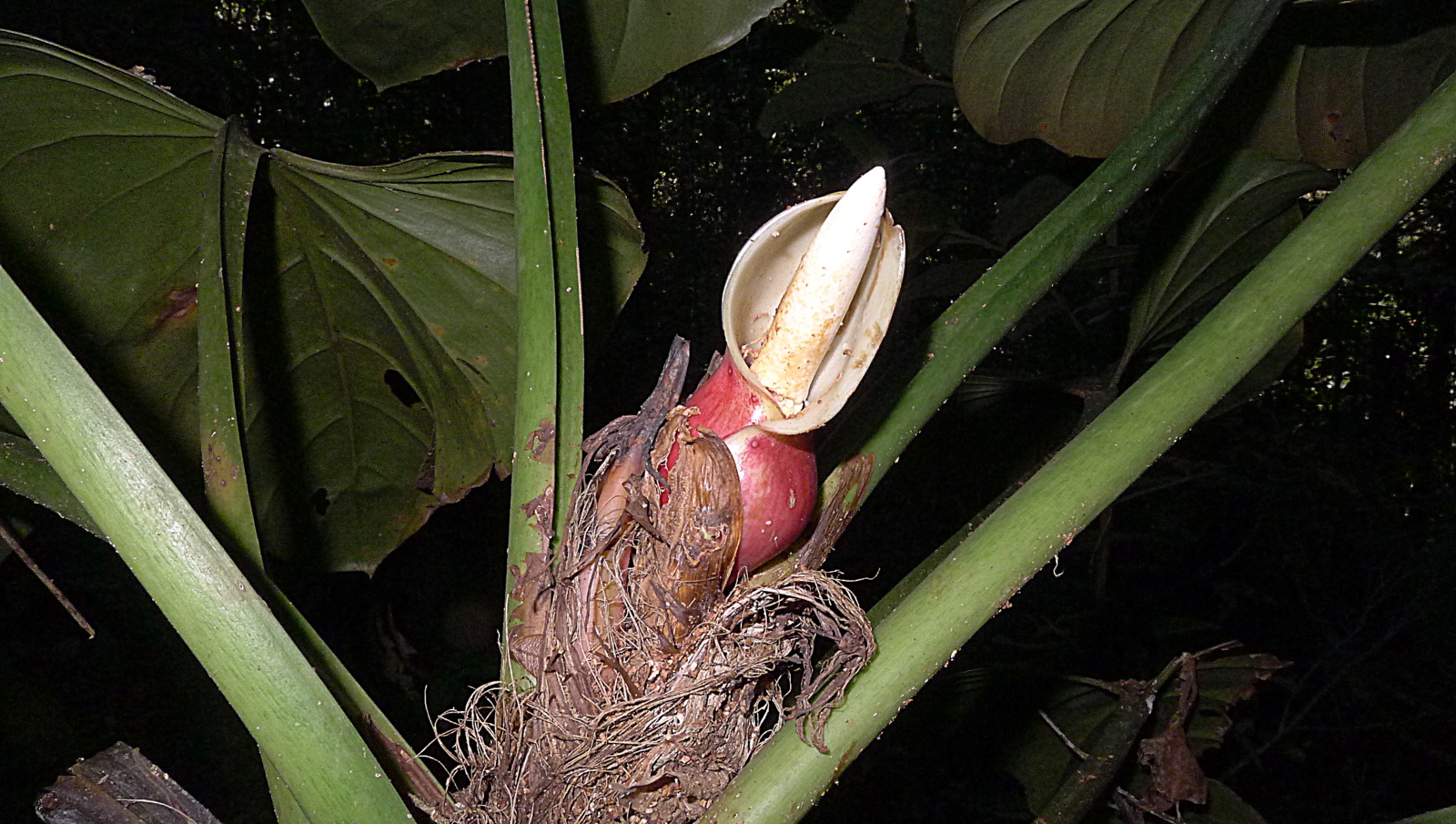
Flower

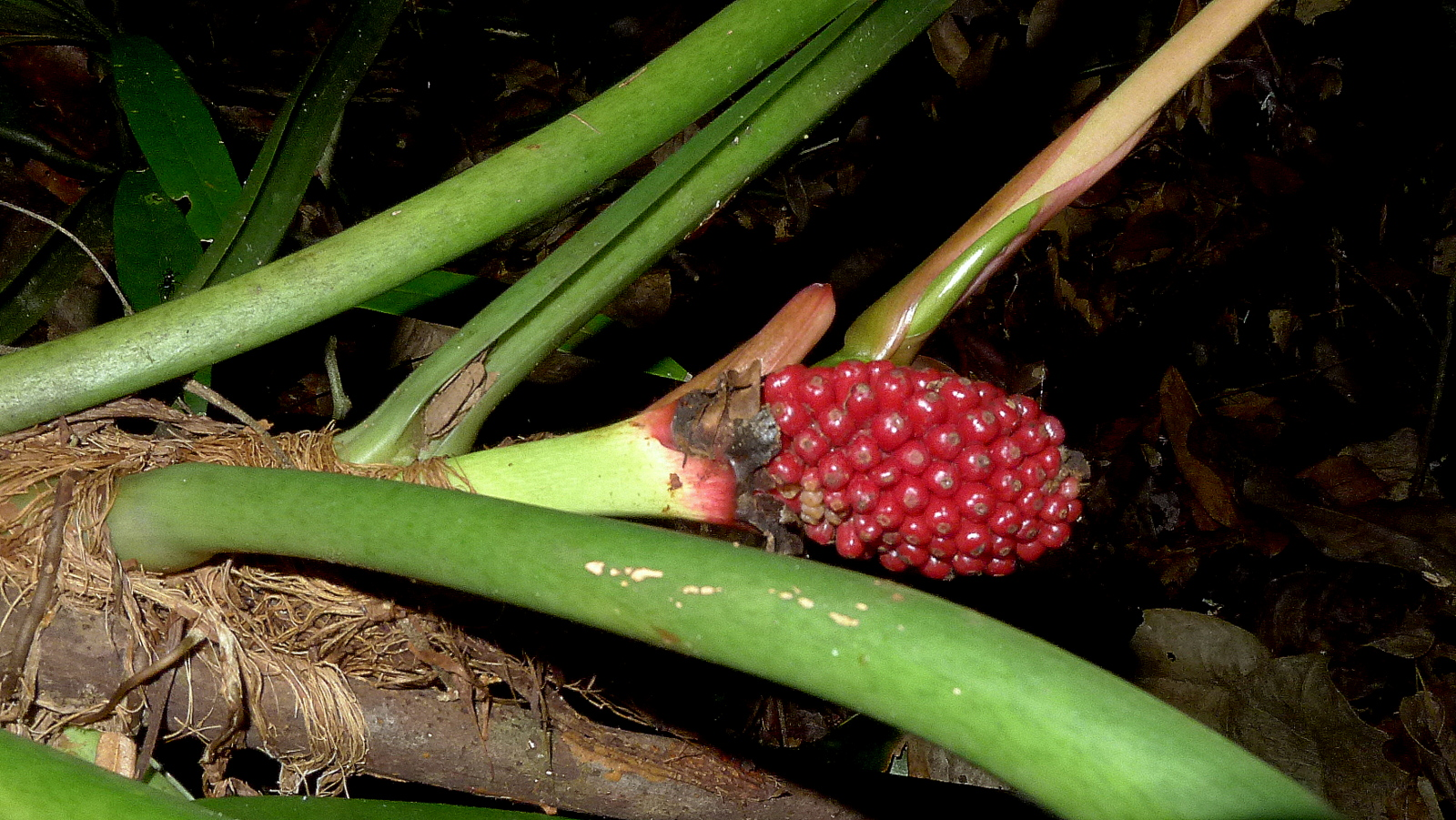
Fruit

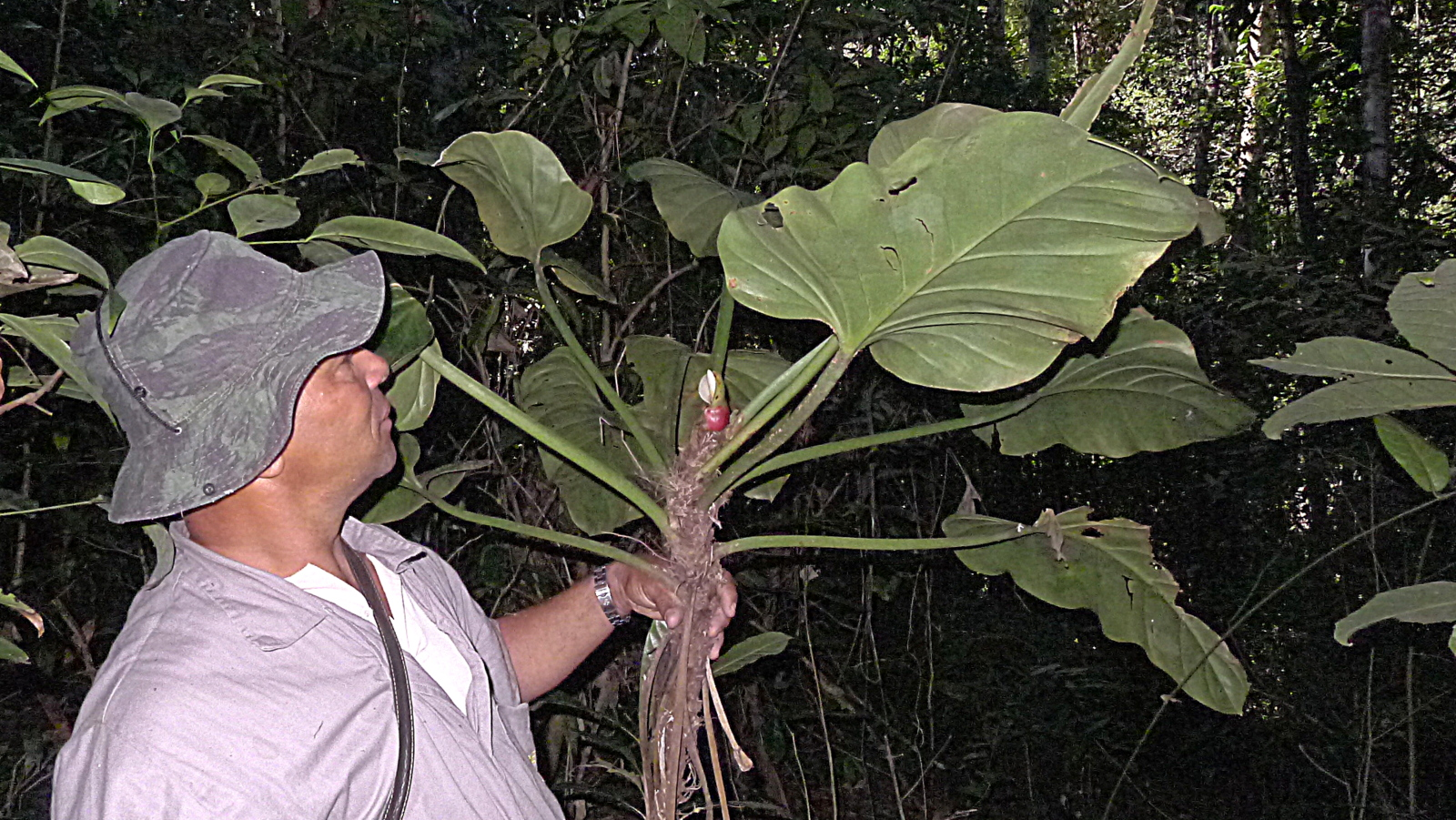
With human for scale
