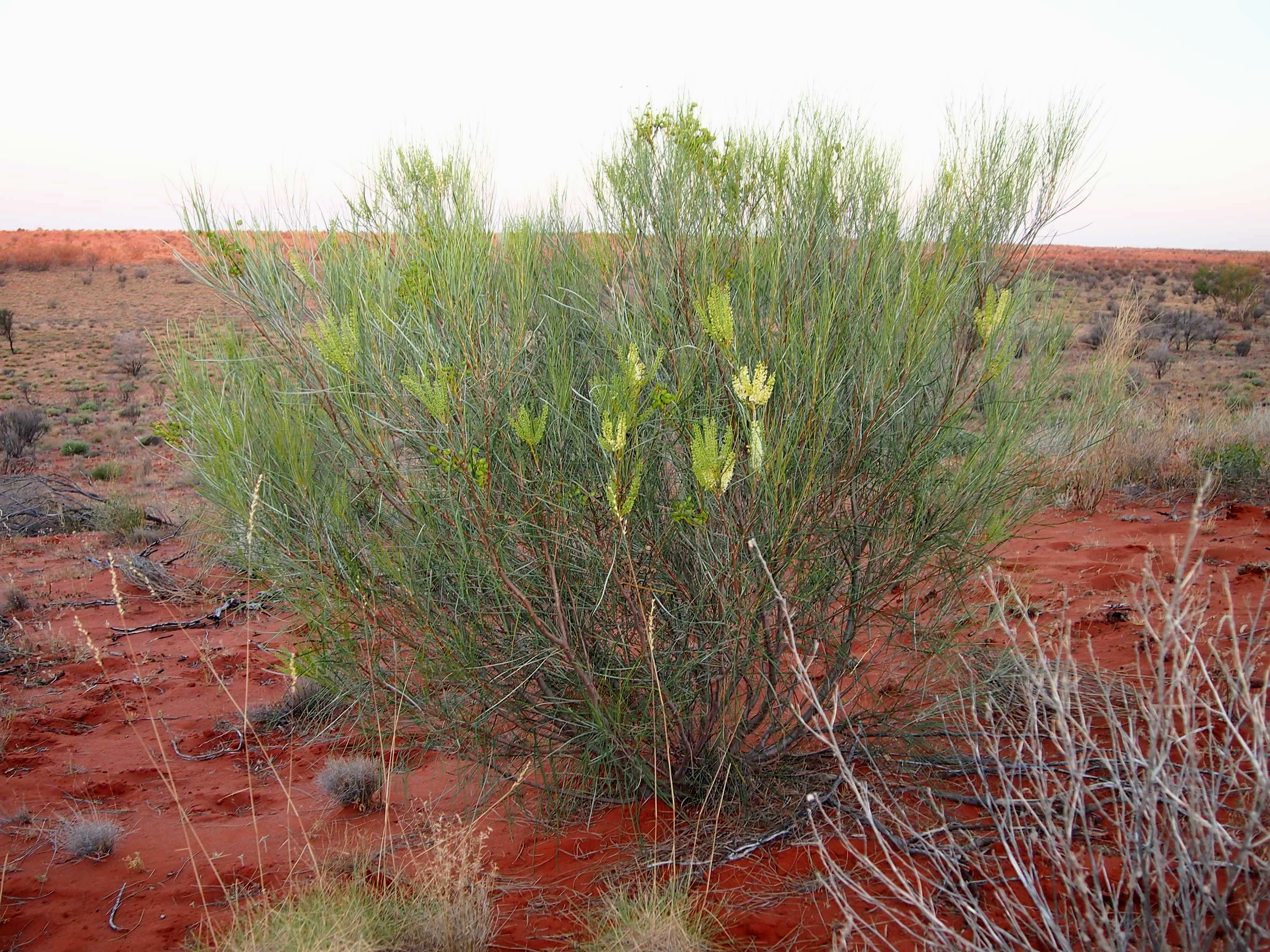
- Grevillea stenobotrya habit

Scientific classification
- Kingdom: Plantae
- Clade: Tracheophytes
- Clade: Angiosperms
- Clade: Eudicots
- Order: Proteales
- Family: Proteaceae
- Genus: Grevillea
- Species: G. stenobotrya

Binomial name
- Grevillea stenobotrya F.Muell.

Synonyms
- Grevillea livea Ewart & M.E.L.Archer; Grevillea simulans Morrison

= Grevillea stenobotrya =

Species of shrub endemic to Australia

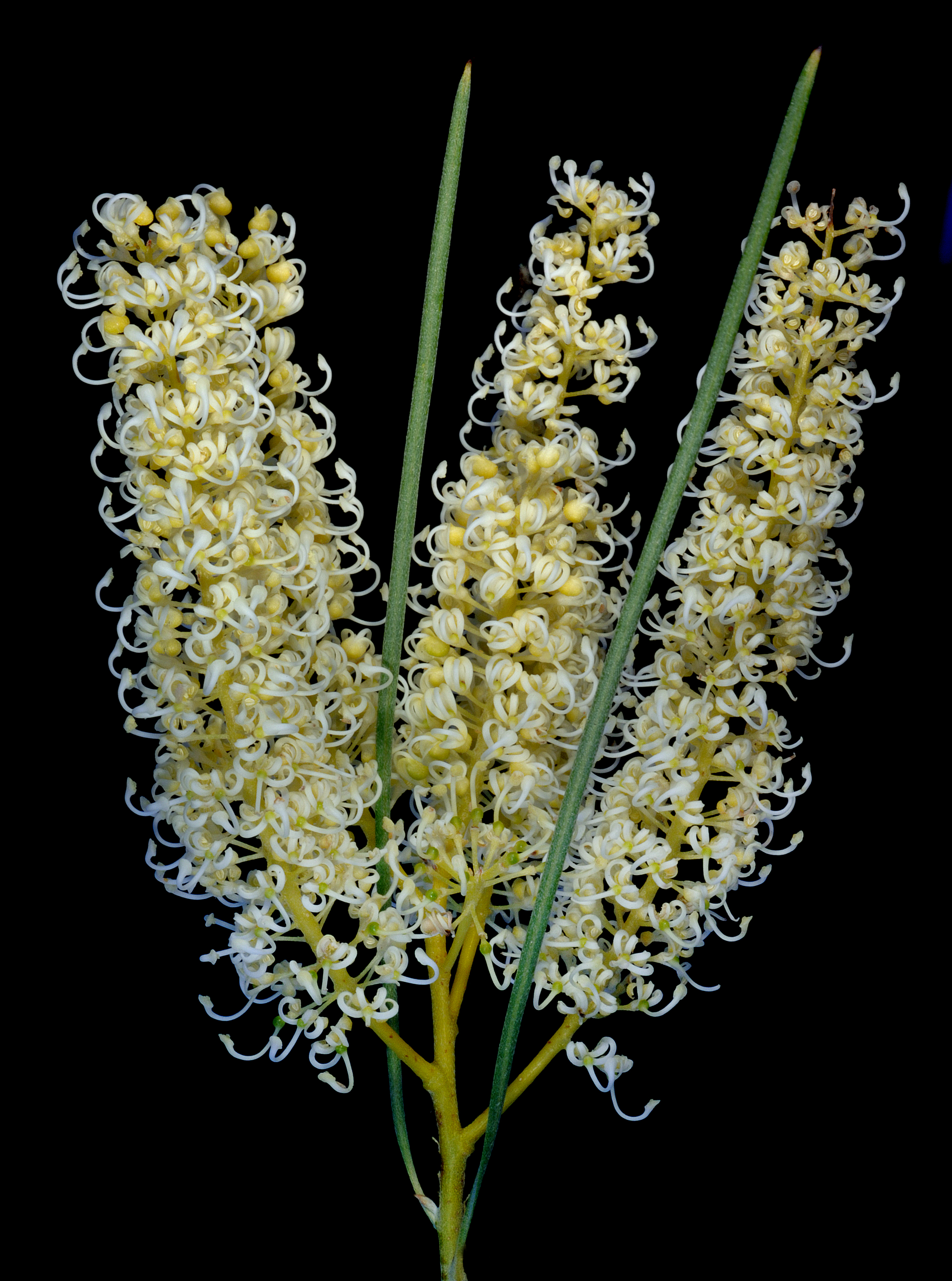

Grevillea stenobotrya is a shrub or small tree in the family Proteaceae, and is endemic to arid regions of Australia. Common names include rattle-pod grevillea, sandhill grevillea, sandhill oak and sandhill spider flower.

== Description ==
Plants typically grow to a height of 1.5 to 6 m (4 ft 11 in to 19 ft 8 in) and branch near the base and have smooth grey coloured bark and a rounded habit. The evergreen leaves are green on top and silver underneath with a linear shape. The long and thin leaves are linear and entire, or occasionally divided with a length of 6 to 28 cm (2.4 to 11.0 in) and a width of 0.7 to 2.5 mm (0.028 to 0.098 in). Flowers are cream, pale yellow or pale pink. These appear in clustered spikes at the end of branches between May and December in the species' native range. The erect inflorescences are 8 to 25 cm (3.1 to 9.8 in) in length with multiple cylindrical to narrow-subconical branches with a cream to pale yellow coloured perianth that is sparsely silky on the outside and with erect hairs or glabrous on the inside. The fruits which follow are hard, flattened and rounded and have a short beak.

== Taxonomy ==
The species was formally described in 1875 by Victorian Government Botanist Ferdinand von Mueller in the ninth volume of his Fragmenta Phytographiae Australiae. Mueller's description was based on plant material collected in the MacDonnell Ranges in central Australia during an expedition by Ernest Giles. The specific epithet is derived from the Greek words stenos (narrow) and botrys (bunch of grapes). It occurs in red sandhill country in association with other shrub and Triodia species. The Australian Plant Census lists two synonyms; Grevillea simulans Morrison (1912) and Grevillea livea Ewart & M.E.L.Archer (1917).

== Distribution ==
In Western Australia the plant is found in the Gascoyne, Pilbara, north-eastern Mid West, south Kimberley and north-eastern Goldfields regions. It is found as far west as Denham to between Port Hedland and Broome in the north and down to around the Great Victoria Desert in the south. The range extends as far east as the border with the Northern Territory and South Australia. It is commonly found situated on sand dunes growing in red sandy soils. It is also found in central and southern parts of the Northern Territory and northern parts of South Australia on sand flats, sand dunes and swales where it is can be a dominant or co-dominant plant in sclerophyllous woodland or shrubland communities. The range extends into south western parts of Queensland and north western parts of New South Wales in the east. In New South Wales it is confined to a small area around Tibooburra where it is situated in sandhill country usually on or near the crests of active or stable dunes as a part of shrubland and Triodia communities.

== Cultivation ==
The plant is available commercially is seed form and is suitable for arid areas and can be used as a screen or hedge which will flower in winter and spring. It prefers an open sunny position in a well drained soil and is frost and drought tolerant. It is unsuitable for wet or humid areas.

== Other uses ==
Indigenous Australians used the leaves for medicinal purposes and the seeds as a food source. The dried seed pods were also used for rattles as part of ceremonial processes.

== See also ==
- List of Grevillea species
