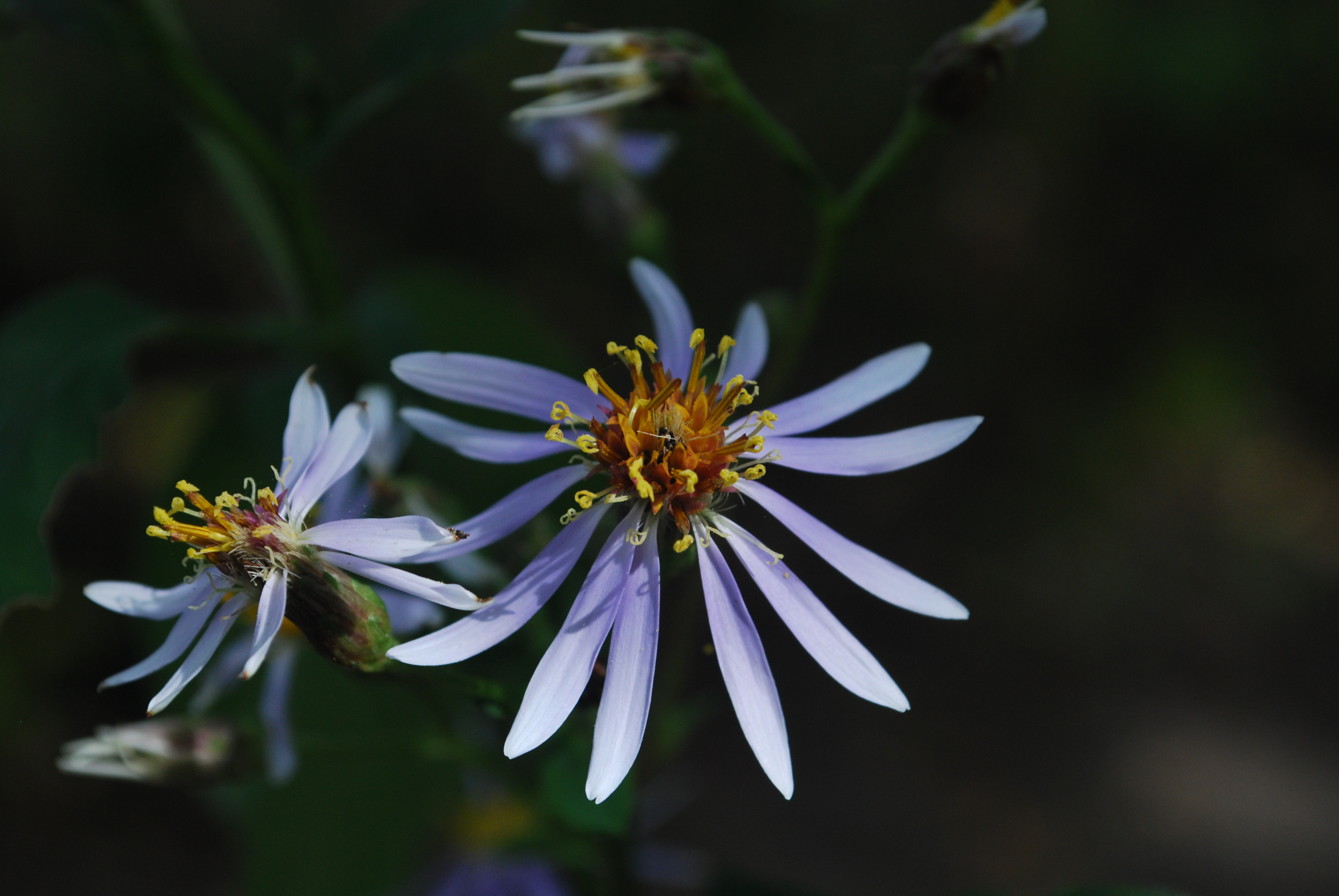

Conservation status
- Secure (NatureServe)

Scientific classification
- Kingdom: Plantae
- Clade: Tracheophytes
- Clade: Angiosperms
- Clade: Eudicots
- Clade: Asterids
- Order: Asterales
- Family: Asteraceae
- Genus: Eurybia
- Species: E. macrophylla

Binomial name
- Eurybia macrophylla (L.) Cass.

Synonyms
- Synonymy: Aster macrophyllus L.; Aster multiformis E.S.Burgess; Aster riciniatus E.S.Burgess; Aster ianthinus E.S.Burgess; Aster nobilis E.S.Burgess; Aster roscidus E.S.Burgess; Aster violaris E.S.Burgess; Biotia latifolia Cass.; Biotia macrophylla (L.) DC; Eurybia jussiei Cass.; Aster ambiguus Bernh. ex Nees; Aster jussiei (Coss.) E.S.Burgess; Aster latifolius Desf.; Aster polyphyllus Moench; Aster subcymosus Bernh. ex Nees

= Eurybia macrophylla =

Largeleaf aster

Species of flowering plant

Eurybia macrophylla, commonly known as the bigleaf aster, large-leaved aster, largeleaf aster or bigleaf wood aster, is an herbaceous perennial in the family Asteraceae that was formerly treated in the genus Aster. It is native to eastern North America, with a range extending from eastern and central Canada (from Nova Scotia to Manitoba) through the northeastern deciduous and mixed forests of New England and the Great Lakes region and south along the Appalachians as far as the northeastern corner of Georgia, and west as far as Minnesota, Missouri and Arkansas. The flowers appear in the late summer to early fall and show ray florets that are usually either a deep lavender or violet, but sometimes white, and disc florets that are cream-coloured or light yellow, becoming purple as they mature. It is one of the parent species of the hybrid Eurybia × herveyi.

== Description ==
Eurybia macrophylla is a perennial herbaceous plant with alternate, simple, toothed leaves. The basal leaves are large and heart-shaped, whereas the upper stem leaves are smaller and lance-shaped. The flowers form on flat-topped corymbs.

== Distribution and habitat ==
Eurybia macrophylla is native to southern parts of eastern and central Canada and to northern parts of the eastern and central United States, south to northern Georgia in the Appalachian Mountains. In Canada, it is common in Manitoba, Ontario, Quebec, New Brunswick, Nova Scotia, and Prince Edward Island. In the United States, it can be found in all states east of and including Minnesota, Iowa, Illinois, Missouri and Tennessee. It may also be present in Mississippi. The plant has also been introduced outside of its native range into northern Europe. It is most often encountered at 0 to 1300 metre (0–4300 feet) elevations in moist to dry soils in association with hemlock–northern hardwood, beech–maple or pine forests, Appalachian spruce–fir forests, as well as with aspen, pine or open spruce woodlands. It can also be found in thickets, clearings or along shaded roadsides.

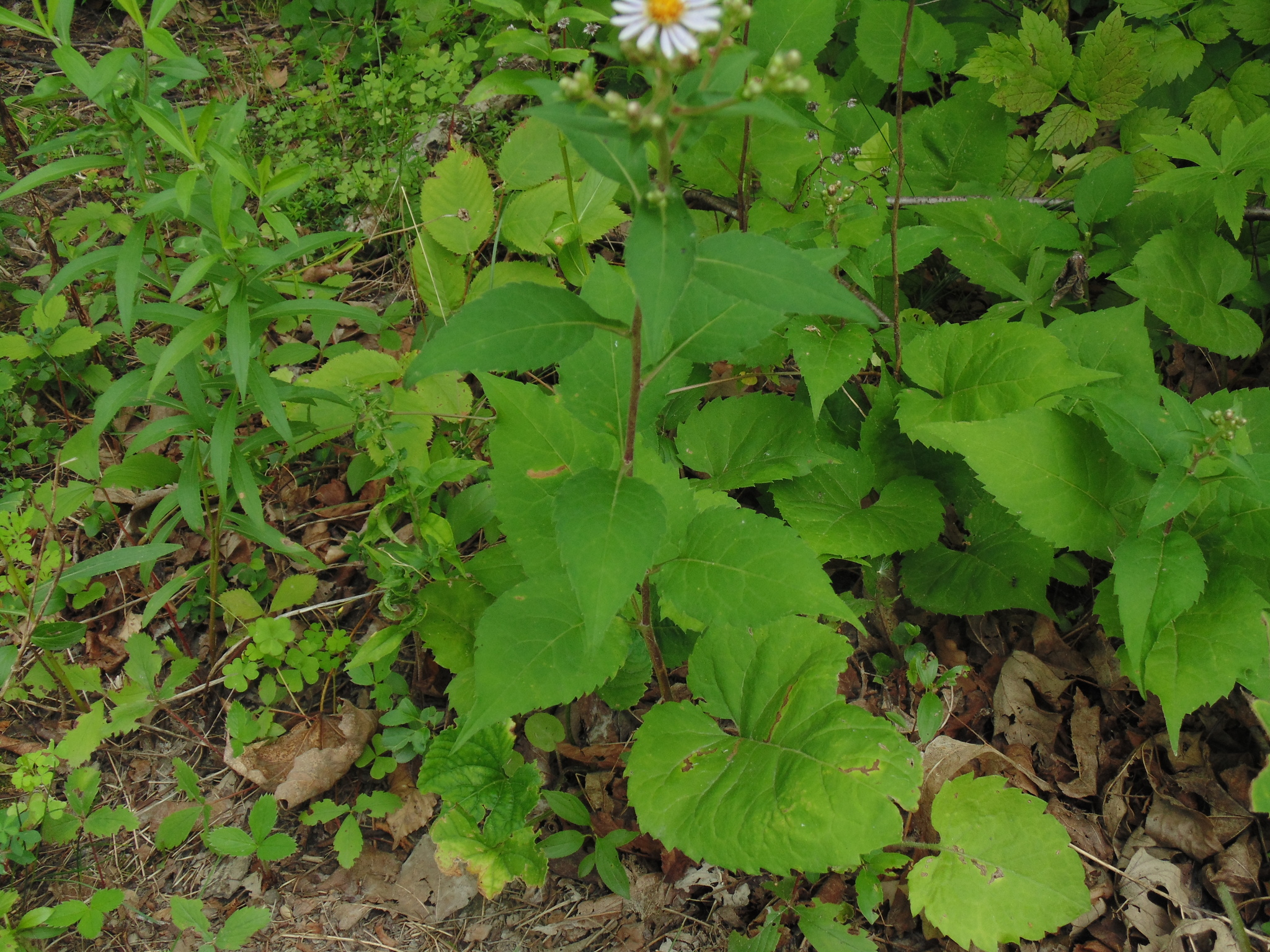
Growth form of Eurybia macrophylla, showing large, heart-shaped basal leaves and lance-shaped upper leaves

== Conservation status within the United States ==
It is listed as endangered in Iowa and as a special concern in Rhode Island.

== Uses ==
The large, thick young leaves can be cooked and eaten as greens. The Algonquin people of Quebec use the leaves in this way.

The Iroquois use the root as a blood medicine, and they also use a compound decoction of the roots to loosen the bowels to treat venereal disease. The Ojibwa bathe their heads with an infusion of this plant to treat headaches. They also smoke it as hunting charm to attract deer. They consume the young leaves of the plant as both food and medicine, and use the roots to make soup.
