= Dunia =

Dunia may refer to:

== Arts and entertainment ==
- Dunia (1946 film), an Egyptian film
- Dunia (2005 film), an Egyptian film
- Dunia (album), a 1997 album by Raageshwari Loomba.
- Dunia: Into a New World, a South Korean TV program

== People ==
- Khawla Dunia, Syrian poet, journalist, researcher, activist
- Dunia Ayaso (died 2014), a Spanish screenwriter and film director
- Dunia Elvir (born 1973), Honduran TV journalist and producer
- Dunia Susi (born 1987), English footballer

== Other uses ==
- Dunia Engine and Dunia 2, video game engines developed by Ubisoft

== See also ==
- Dunya (disambiguation)
- Duniya (disambiguation)
- Dunja (disambiguation)
- Donia (disambiguation)
- Donya (disambiguation)
