= Coleophora vancouverensis =

Scientific classification
- Kingdom: Animalia
- Phylum: Arthropoda
- Class: Insecta
- Order: Lepidoptera
- Family: Coleophoridae
- Genus: Coleophora
- Species: C. vancouverensis

Binomial name
- Coleophora vancouverensis McDunnough, 1944

Species of moth

Coleophora vancouverensis is a moth of the family Coleophoridae. It is found in Canada.

The larvae feed on the leaves of Grindelia species. They create an annulate case.
