= Aster spathularis =

Aster spathularis may refer to three different species of plants:

- Aster spathularis Lindl., a synonym for Symphyotrichum spathulatum (Lindl.) G.L.Nesom
- Aster spathularis Steud., a synonym for Pentanema salicinum (L.) D.Gut.Larr. et al.
- Aster spathularis Lag. ex Nees, a synonym for Grindelia inuloides var. inuloides Willd.
