= Donya (name) =

Donya is a feminine given name, particularly in the Middle East and North Africa. In Persian "Donya" (دنیا) means "world" or "earth." In Persian literature, Donya is mentioned in the works of famous poets like Rumi and Hafez. In some Slavic countries, such as Russia and Bulgaria, "Donya" (Доня) is a diminutive form of names like "Donata" or "Donka," meaning "gift" or "generous."

The name Donya in Italy is derived from the Italian word "donna," meaning "lady" or "woman." This term is derived from the Latin word "domina," signifying a woman of high social status or a lady of the house. The name gained popularity during the Renaissance period, particularly in the southern region of Sicily.

The name Donya also dates back to the Russian name Avdotya, a version of the Greek Eudokia. Eudokia comes from the word “eudokeo,” which translates to “well-pleased” or “satisfied.” It comes from the terms “eu” and “dokeo.” “Eu” means “good,” and “dokeo” means “to think,” “to imagine,” or “to suppose.”

== Popularity ==
In the United States, the name Donya experienced its peak popularity in 2002 when it was given to 57 in every million births. However, in 2021, only 19 baby girls were named Donya. It was ranked as the 3755th most popular name in 2000 but dropped significantly to 8143 by 2023.

== Given name ==
- Donya Salomon-Ali (born 1993), Canadian-born Haitian footballer
- Donya Aziz, Pakistani politician
- Donya Dadrasan (born 2001), Iranian singer
- Donya Fannizadeh (1967–2016), Iranian puppeteer
- Donya Feuer (1934–2011), American dancer
- Donya Tesoro (born 1991), Filipina politician
