= Donia =

Donia may refer to:

== People ==
- Donia Hamed, Egyptian model
- Donia Nachshen (1903–1987), Ukrainian-born British book illustrator and poster artist
- Donia Samir Ghanem, Egyptian actress and singer
- Pier Gerlofs Donia (c. 1480–1520), Frisian rebel leader and pirate
- Haring Harinxma (1323–1404), or Haring Donia, Frisian chieftain
- Tony Donia, Canadian soccer player

== Places ==
- Donia, Chad
- Donia, Guinea,

== Other uses ==
- Donia (mite), a genus of mites
- Donia R.Br. 1813, synonym of Grindelia Willd. 1807, a genus of gumweeds
- Donia G. Don & D. Don ex G.Don 1832, synonym of Clianthus Sol. ex Lindl. 1835, a genus of legumes

== See also ==
- Donka (disambiguation)
- Donya (disambiguation)
- Donja, a component in the names of
- Doña, a Spanish honorific title
