= Dunya (disambiguation) =

Dunya is an Arabic word referring to the temporal world.

Dunya may also refer to:

== Arts and entertainment ==
- Dunya (Nazeel Azami album), 2006
- Dunya (Mustafa album), 2024
- Dunya, a fictional character in "The Station Master", a short story from Pushkin's The Belkin Tales
- Dunya, a fictional character in Dostoevsky's Crime and Punishment

== Media ==
- Dünya (newspaper), a Turkish newspaper
- Dunya News, a current affairs TV channel in Pakistan
- Daily Dunya, a newspaper in Pakistan

== People ==
=== Given name ===
- Dunya Abutaleb (born 1997), Saudi taekwondo competitor
- Dunya al-Amal Ismail (born 1971), Palestinian poet
- Dunya Maumoon (born 1970), Maldives politician and government minister
- Dunya Mikhail (born 1965), Iraqi-American poet
- Dunya Ramicova (born 1950), Czech costume designer
- Dunya Smirnova (born 1969), Russian screenwriter, film director, producer, TV host, and literary critic

=== Surname ===
- Ibn Abi al-Dunya (823–894), a Muslim scholar

== Other uses ==
- Dunya University of Afghanistan
- Bassarona dunya, or great marquis, a butterfly

== See also ==
- Dunia (disambiguation)
- Duniya (disambiguation)
- Dunja (disambiguation)
- Donya (disambiguation)
