= Donya =

Donya may refer to:

== People ==
- Donya (name)
- Donya, a diminutive of the Russian male first name Avdon

== Other uses ==
- Donya, an Iranian theoretical magazine in the 1930s
- Donya (album), by Arash, 2008
- Donya (film), 2003
- Dunya, or donya, an Arabic word that means the temporal world

== See also ==
- Donia (disambiguation)
- Donka (disambiguation)
- Dunya (disambiguation)
- Dunia (disambiguation)
- Doña, an honorific title
- Donyo
