= Dondo =

Dondo may refer to:

== Places ==
- Dondo, Angola, a town and commune
- Dondo, Mozambique, a city
- Dondo, Sulawesi, a district in Tolitoli Regency, Sulawesi, Indonesia
- Dondo District, a district in Mozambique

== People ==
- Dondo (people), a Central African ethnic group
- Dondo (people), a group in the Baolan, Dondo, Galang and North Dampal in the Toli-Toli regency of Central Sulawesi, Indonesia
- Léon Kengo Wa Dondo (born 1935), Zaïrian politician
- The descendants and French ancestors of Guillaume Dondo (1864) and his wife Marie-Anne Dacquay who settled in Manitoba, Canada in the first decade of the twentieth century

== Other uses ==
- Dondo Dam, Miki, Hyōgo Prefecture, Japan
- Dondo language (Austronesian), a language of Sulawesi in Indonesia
- Dondo, a talking drum in the Akan languages
- Dondo, the second album by Bice Osei Kuffour, (born 1981), a Ghanaian hiplife musician

== See also ==
- Donyo
