= Duniya =

Duniya may refer to:

== Arts and entertainment ==
- Duniya (1968 film), an Indian Hindi-language romantic thriller
- Duniya (1984 film), an Indian Hindi-language film
- Duniya (2007 film), an Indian Kannada-language film
- Duniya (album), a 1997 album by Raageshwari Loomba
- Duniya (The Intrinsic Passion of Mysterious Joy), a 1994 album by Loop Guru
- "Duniya", a song by B Praak, from the 2025 Indian film Jombieland

== People ==
- Duniya Soori, Indian film director
- Duniya Vijay (born 1974), Indian actor

== See also ==
- Dunia (disambiguation)
- Dunya (disambiguation)
- Dunja (disambiguation)
- Aaj Ki Duniya (lit. 'Today's World'), a 1940 Indian film by G. P. Pawar
