= Grindelia tenella =

Scientific classification
- Kingdom: Plantae
- Clade: Tracheophytes
- Clade: Angiosperms
- Clade: Eudicots
- Clade: Asterids
- Order: Asterales
- Family: Asteraceae
- Genus: Grindelia
- Species: G. tenella

Binomial name
- Grindelia tenella Steyerm. 1934

Species of flowering plant

Grindelia tenella is a North American species of flowering plants in the family Asteraceae.

It is native to northeastern Mexico, in the States of Tamaulipas, Nuevo León, ane San Luis Potosí.
