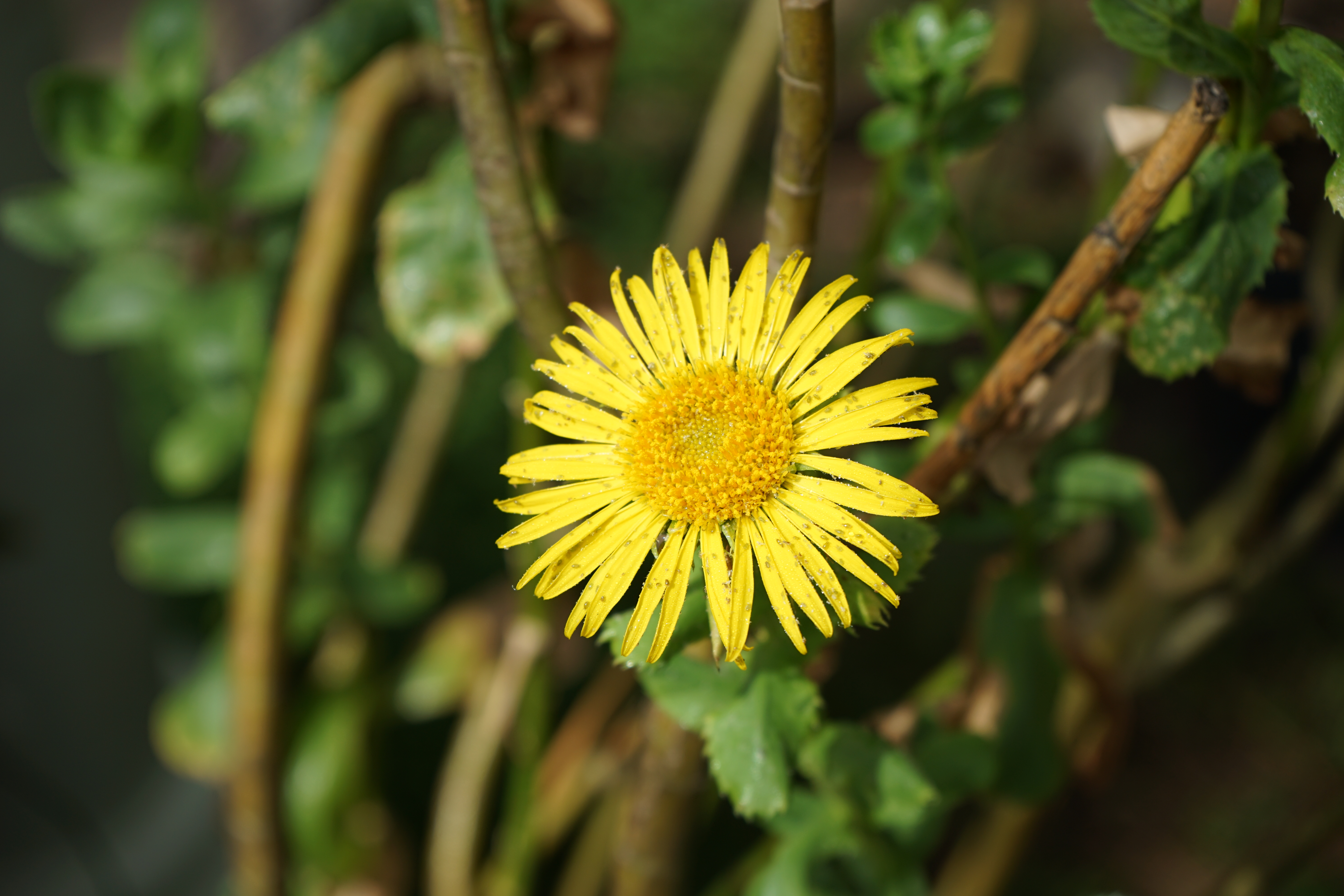

Scientific classification
- Kingdom: Plantae
- Clade: Tracheophytes
- Clade: Angiosperms
- Clade: Eudicots
- Clade: Asterids
- Order: Asterales
- Family: Asteraceae
- Genus: Grindelia
- Species: G. buphthalmoides

Binomial name
- Grindelia buphthalmoides DC. 1836

= Grindelia buphthalmoides =

Species of flowering plant

Grindelia buphthalmoides is a species of flowering plants in the family Asteraceae found in Brazil, Uruguay, and Argentina, classified by Augustin Pyramus de Candolle in 1836.
