= Grindelia confusa =

Scientific classification
- Kingdom: Plantae
- Clade: Tracheophytes
- Clade: Angiosperms
- Clade: Eudicots
- Clade: Asterids
- Order: Asterales
- Family: Asteraceae
- Genus: Grindelia
- Species: G. confusa

Binomial name
- Grindelia confusa Steyerm. 1938

Species of flowering plant

Grindelia confusa is a rare North American species of flowering plants in the family Asteraceae. It is native to northern Mexico, found only low-lying areas in Namiquipa Municipality within the State of Chihuahua.

Grindelia confusa is unusual among Mexican species of the genus in having narrow, lobed leaves with spines at the tips of the lobes. It is a branching perennial herb up to 20 cm (8 in) tall. The plant usually produces one flower head one per flower stalk. Each head has 15-20 ray flowers, surrounding a large number of tiny disc flowers.
