= Grindelia turneri =

Scientific classification
- Kingdom: Plantae
- Clade: Tracheophytes
- Clade: Angiosperms
- Clade: Eudicots
- Clade: Asterids
- Order: Asterales
- Family: Asteraceae
- Genus: Grindelia
- Species: G. turneri

Binomial name
- Grindelia turneri G.L.Nesom 1990

Species of flowering plant

Grindelia turneri is a North American species of flowering plants in the family Asteraceae. It is native to northeastern Mexico, found only in the State of Nuevo León.

Grindelia turneri is a perennial herb up to 33 cm (13 in) tall, hairless or almost hairless, producing a large taproot. The plant produces only one flower head per flower stalk. Each head has 18-28 ray flowers surrounding many disc flowers.
