= Grindelia robinsonii =

Scientific classification
- Kingdom: Plantae
- Clade: Tracheophytes
- Clade: Angiosperms
- Clade: Eudicots
- Clade: Asterids
- Order: Asterales
- Family: Asteraceae
- Genus: Grindelia
- Species: G. robinsonii

Binomial name
- Grindelia robinsonii Steyerm.

Species of flowering plant

Grindelia robinsonii is a North American species of flowering plants in the family Asteraceae. It is native to northeastern Mexico, found only in the states of Hidalgo and San Luis Potosí.
