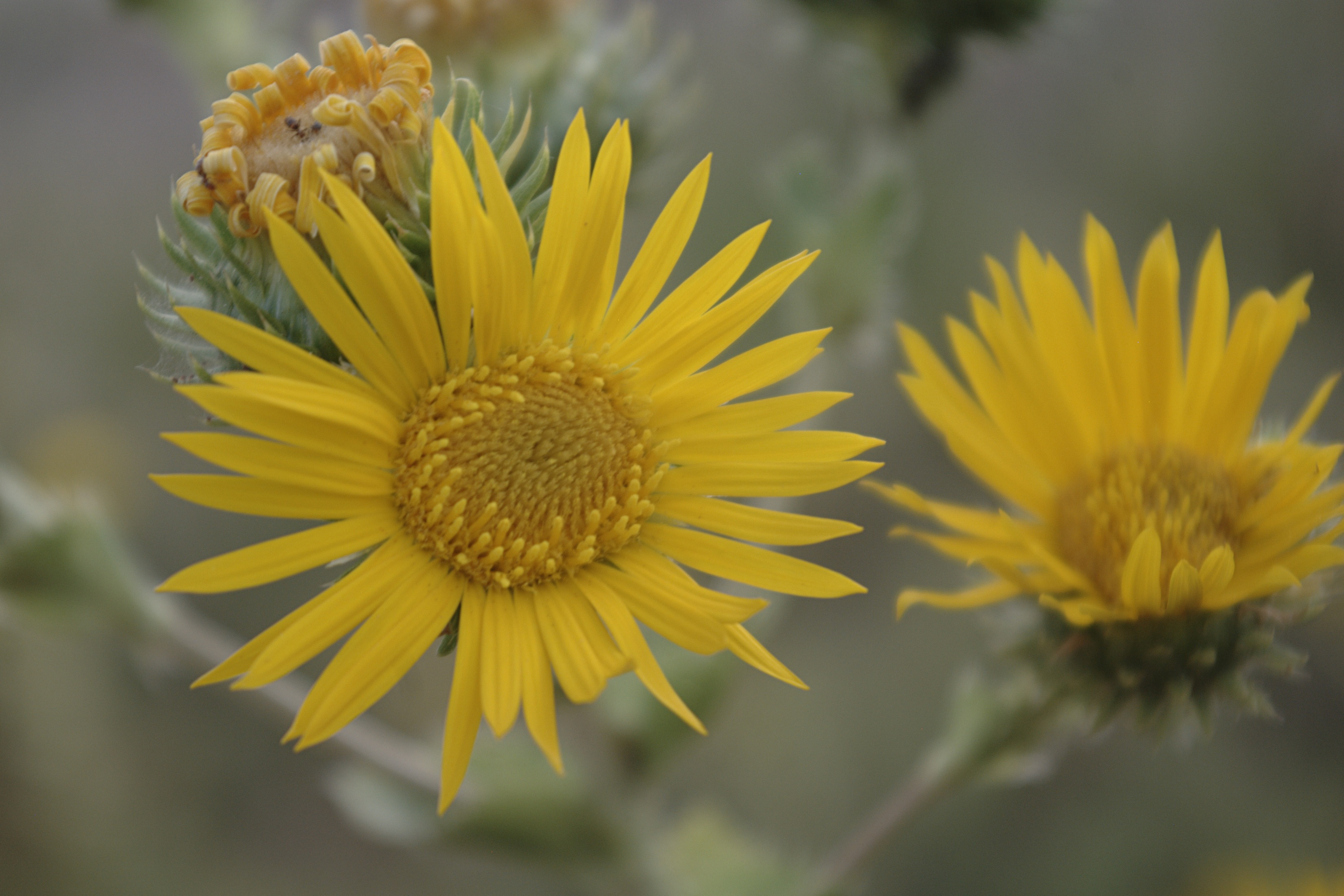

Conservation status
- Apparently Secure (NatureServe)

Scientific classification
- Kingdom: Plantae
- Clade: Tracheophytes
- Clade: Angiosperms
- Clade: Eudicots
- Clade: Asterids
- Order: Asterales
- Family: Asteraceae
- Genus: Grindelia
- Species: G. ciliata

Binomial name
- Grindelia ciliata (Nutt.) Spreng. 1826

Synonyms
- Donia ciliata Nutt. 1821; Haplopappus ciliatus (Nutt.) DC.; Prionopsis ciliata (Nutt.) Nutt.; Aster ciliatus Kuntze; Grindelia papposa G.L.Nesom & Y.B.Suh

= Grindelia ciliata =

Species of flowering plant

Grindelia ciliata (syn. Grindelia papposa, Haplopappus ciliatus, and Prionopsis ciliata) is a species of flowering plant in the family Asteraceae known by the common names Spanish gold, goldenweed, and waxed goldenweed.

Grindelia ciliata is native to sections of the central United States, primarily the Great Plains from Iowa and Nebraska south to Texas and New Mexico. There are also isolated populations in Arizona and apparently naturalized populations in California, Maryland, Michigan, and the Mississippi Valley.

Grindelia ciliata grows in prairies and grasslands, and in disturbed areas such as roadsides and along railroad tracks.

Grindelia ciliata is an annual or biennial shrub sometimes as much as 150 cm (5 feet) tall, its upper stem branching. It is hairless. The leaves are alternately arranged, up to 8 cm (3.2 inches) long, their spiny-toothed blades longer than wide. The top of the stem is occupied by an inflorescence of several flower heads, their hemispheric bases up to 2.5 centimeters (one inch) wide and lined with many small, green phyllaries with curving tips. Each flower head may have up to 30 narrow, pointed yellow ray florets between 1 and 2 centimeters (0.4-0.8 inches) long, surrounding a center of yellow disc florets. The fruit is a brown achene about a centimeter (0.4 inches) long including its long pappus of bristles.
