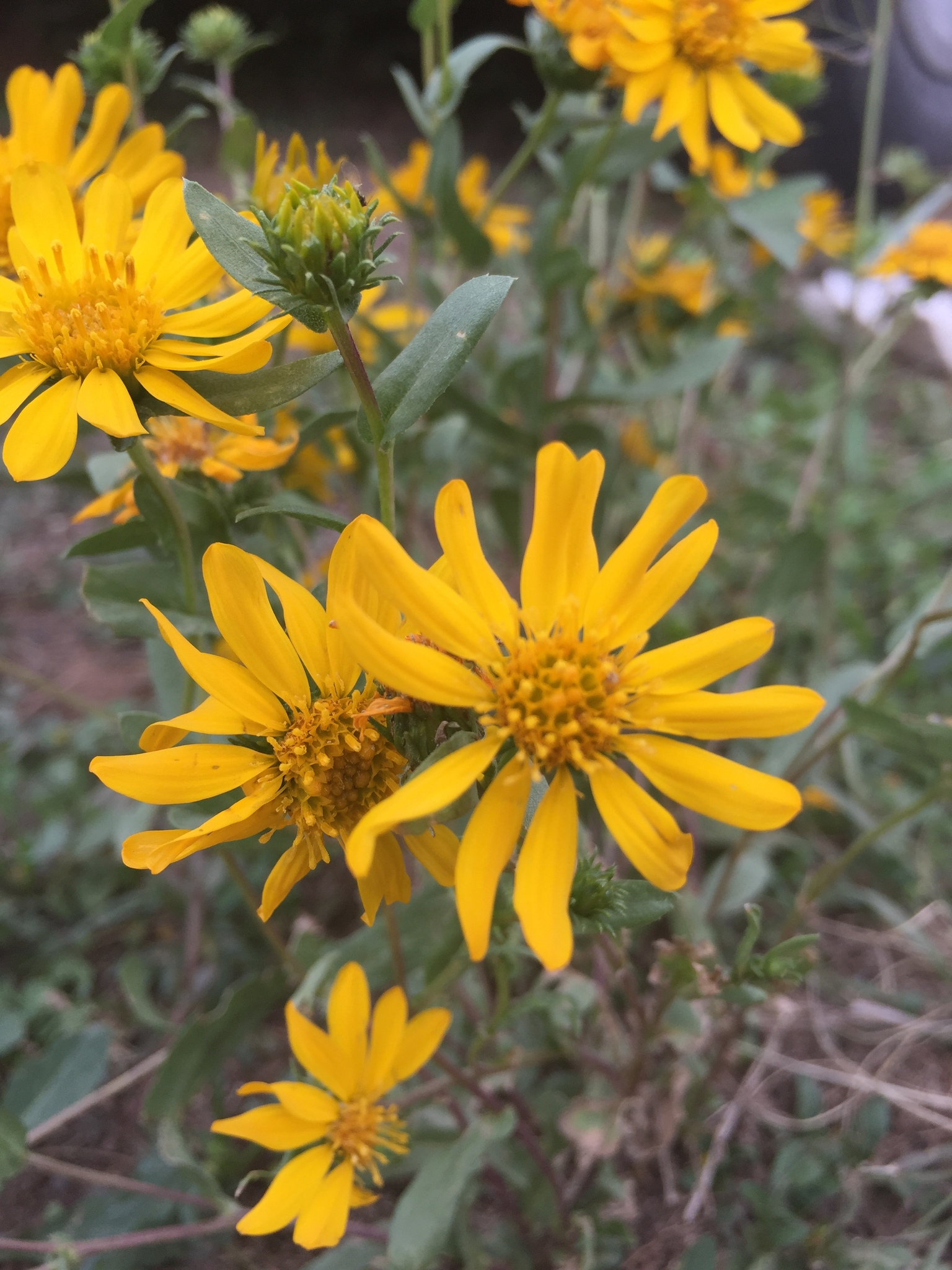

Scientific classification
- Kingdom: Plantae
- Clade: Tracheophytes
- Clade: Angiosperms
- Clade: Eudicots
- Clade: Asterids
- Order: Asterales
- Family: Asteraceae
- Genus: Grindelia
- Species: G. oxylepis

Binomial name
- Grindelia oxylepis Greene 1899

= Grindelia oxylepis =

Species of flowering plant

Grindelia oxylepis, the Mexican gumweed, is a North American species of flowering plants in the family Asteraceae. It is native to northern Mexico, in the States of Chihuahua, Coahuila, Durango, San Luis Potosí, and Zacatecas. The natural range barely crosses the Río Grande into the United States, with a few populations in western Texas and southern New Mexico

Grindelia oxylepis grows in moist valleys and fields. It is an annual or biennial herb up to 55 cm (22 in) tall. The plant usually produces numerous flower heads in open, branching arrays. Each head has 20-30 ray flowers, surrounding a large number of tiny disc flowers.
