= Grindelia grandiflora =

Scientific classification
- Kingdom: Plantae
- Clade: Tracheophytes
- Clade: Angiosperms
- Clade: Eudicots
- Clade: Asterids
- Order: Asterales
- Family: Asteraceae
- Genus: Grindelia
- Species: G. grandiflora

Binomial name
- Grindelia grandiflora Hook. 1852

Synonyms
- Grindelia costata A.Gray; Grindelia squarrosa var. grandiflora (Hook.) A. Gray

Species of flowering plant

Grindelia grandiflora, the manyray gumweed, is a North American species of flowering plants in the family Asteraceae. It is native to the south-central United States and north-central Mexico, in the states of Texas and Coahuila.

Grindelia grandiflora grows in grasslands, scrublands, ditches, and roadsides, and along streambanks. It is an annual herb sometimes as much as 200 cm (80 inches or almost 7 feet) tall. The plant usually produces numerous flower heads in open, branching arrays. Each head has 17-26 ray flowers, surrounding a large number of tiny disc flowers.
