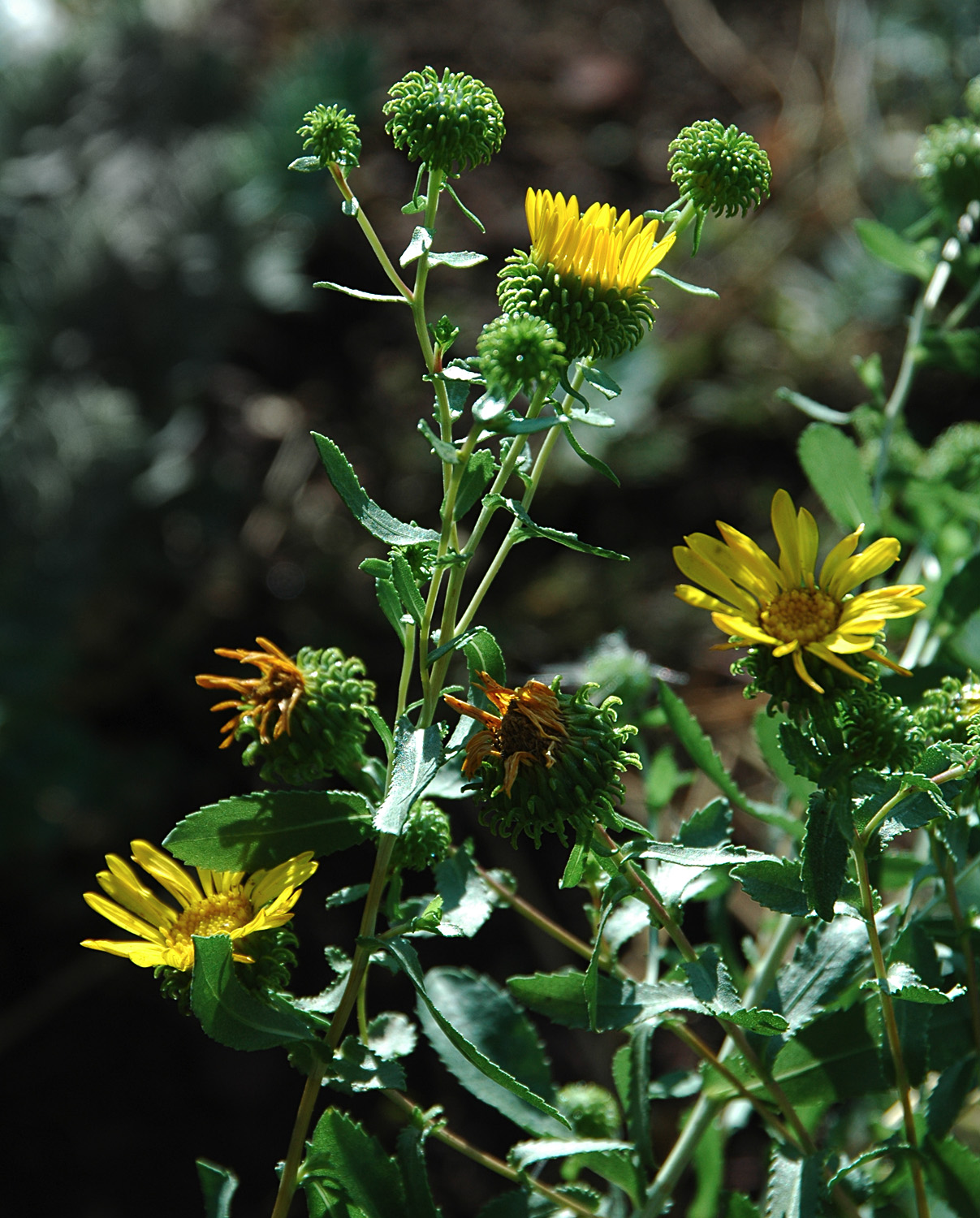

Conservation status
- Secure (NatureServe)

Scientific classification
- Kingdom: Plantae
- Clade: Tracheophytes
- Clade: Angiosperms
- Clade: Eudicots
- Clade: Asterids
- Order: Asterales
- Family: Asteraceae
- Genus: Grindelia
- Species: G. squarrosa

Binomial name
- Grindelia squarrosa (Pursh) Dunal

Synonyms
- Synonymy: Donia squarrosa Pursh 1813; Aurelia amplexicaulis Cass.; Aurelia squarrosa Cass. ex Steud.; Grindelia aphanactis Rydb.; Grindelia arguta A.Gray; Grindelia nuda Alph.Wood; Grindelia pinnatifida Wooton & Standl.; Grindelia serrulata Rydb.

= Grindelia squarrosa =

Species of flowering plant

Grindelia squarrosa, also known as a curly-top gumweed or curlycup gumweed, is a small North American biennial or short-lived perennial plant.

== Description ==
G. squarrosa is an erect, branched biennial or perennial herb or subshrub that is typically 40–100 cm tall. The leaves are 1.5–7.5 cm (1/2–3 in) long, gray-green, crenate with each tooth having a yellow bump near its tip, and resinous.

The plant produces numerous flower heads in open, branching arrays. The flower bract (involucre) is moderately to strongly resinous and consists of multiple overlapping rows of phyllaries with tips that are strongly curled outward, hooked or looped, sometimes curling back to form a circle. Each head usually contains 12–40 yellow ray flowers, though sometimes the rays are absent. These surround many small disc flowers. The plant blooms from July through late September. The brown seed is usually four-angled, with loose scales.

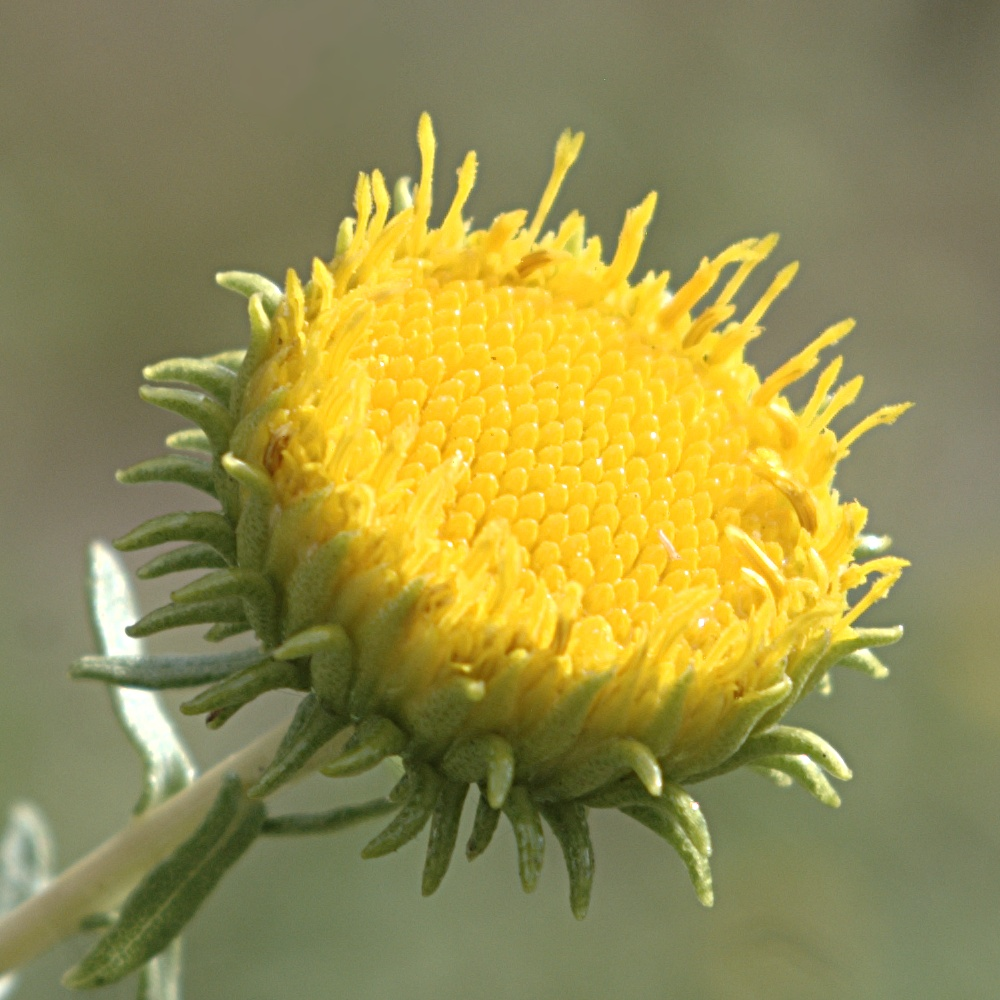
A form with rayless flowers is sometimes considered a distinct species.

=== Varieties ===
- Grindelia squarrosa var. quasiperennis
- Grindelia squarrosa var. serrulata
- Grindelia squarrosa var. squarrosa

== Distribution and habitat ==
The species is native to western and central North America, from British Columbia east to Québec and New England, and south as far as California, New Mexico, Arizona, Chihuahua, and Texas. The species may possibly be naturalized in much of the eastern part of that distribution, and has been introduced into Asia in Ukraine.

It is often found in dry, open areas and disturbed roadsides and streamsides, occurring between 700 metres (2,300 feet) and 2,300 metres (7,500 feet) in elevation.

== Ecology ==
Though sage grouse chicks reportedly eat this plant, tannins, volatile oils, resins, bitter alkaloids, and glucosides make curlycup gumweed unpalatable to most wildlife.

The species is listed by the Lady Bird Johnson Wildflower Center Native Plant Information Network as of "Special Value to Native Bees."

Because of its weedy nature- often volunteering to grow in disturbed areas on its own, curlycup gumweed has been tested in Wisconsin to seed disturbed roadsides, which has demonstrated good results under adverse conditions.

== Toxicity ==
The plant concentrates selenium from the soil, and can be toxic when ingested by cattle, humans, and other mammals, but is rarely eaten because of its unpleasant taste. It is a plant that can increase with overgrazing since it isn't very palatable to begin with, and can have a negative effect on the range. It can also indicate poor range management since other species can usually compete with it and slow down its expansion, if they are allowed to grow.

== Uses ==
The flowers and leaves are used by Great Plains Tribes as a medicinal herb to treat illnesses such as asthma, bronchitis or skin rashes. The powdered flowers were also once smoked in cigarettes to ease asthmatic symptoms.

It is used as a traditional medicinal plant by Shoshone peoples in various regions. The Gosiute language name for the plant is mu’-ha-kûm. The Lakota language name for the plant is pteíčhiyuȟa.

Hispanos of New Mexico boiled the buds to make a drink to treat kidney disorders. Extracts have been made to treat skin irritations, asthma, and rheumatism. The resin has been used to treat poison ivy rashes topically.

The plant is being explored as a potential source of biofuel due to its high content of mono- and di-terpenes which can be converted to a fuel analogous to kerosene or jet fuel. The plant's adaptation to arid climates makes it an attractive option as its cultivation in desert areas would not compete with traditional food crops.
