= Grindelia pusilla =

Scientific classification
- Kingdom: Plantae
- Clade: Tracheophytes
- Clade: Angiosperms
- Clade: Eudicots
- Clade: Asterids
- Order: Asterales
- Family: Asteraceae
- Genus: Grindelia
- Species: G. pusilla

Binomial name
- Grindelia pusilla (Steyerm.) G.L.Nesom 1992

Synonyms
- Grindelia microcephala var. pusilla Steyerm. 1934

Species of flowering plant

Grindelia pusilla, the little gumweed, is a North American species of flowering plants in the family Asteraceae. It is found only in the state of Texas in the south-central United States.

Grindelia pusilla grows in open, dry sites, often disturbed. It is an annual herb up to 70 cm (28 in) tall. The plant usually produces numerous flower heads in flat-topped arrays. Each head has 13-27 ray flowers, surrounding a large number of tiny disc flowers.
