= Grindelia nelsonii =

Scientific classification
- Kingdom: Plantae
- Clade: Tracheophytes
- Clade: Angiosperms
- Clade: Eudicots
- Clade: Asterids
- Order: Asterales
- Family: Asteraceae
- Genus: Grindelia
- Species: G. nelsonii

Binomial name
- Grindelia nelsonii Steyerm. 1934

Species of flowering plant

Grindelia nelsonii is a North American species of flowering plants in the family Asteraceae.

It is endemic to western Mexico, native to the States of Michoacán, Jalisco, and Colima.

Grindelia nelsonii is taller than most of its relatives, sometimes reaching 200 cm (80 inches or almost 7 feet) in height. It also produces a flat-topped array of several flower heads at the end of each stem, rather than just one as is common in related species.
