= Dongo =

Dongo may refer to:

== People ==
- Guillermo Dongo (born 1982), Surinamese sprinter
- Luete Ava Dongo (born 1996), Congolese footballer
- Margaret Dongo (born 1960), Zimbabwean politician

== Places ==
- Kingdom of Ndongo, an early-modern African state located in present-day Angola
- Dongo, Huíla, Angola
- Dongo, Central African Republic
- Dongo, Democratic Republic of the Congo
- Dongo, Lombardy, Italy
- Dongo, Mali

== Languages ==
- Dongo language, a Ubangian language spoken in the Democratic Republic of the Congo
- Dongo language (Nilo-Saharan), spoken in South Sudan

== Other uses ==
- Dong-o station, a metro station in Uijeongbu, South Korea
- Feiro Dongó, a Hungarian biplane

== See also ==
- Donyo
