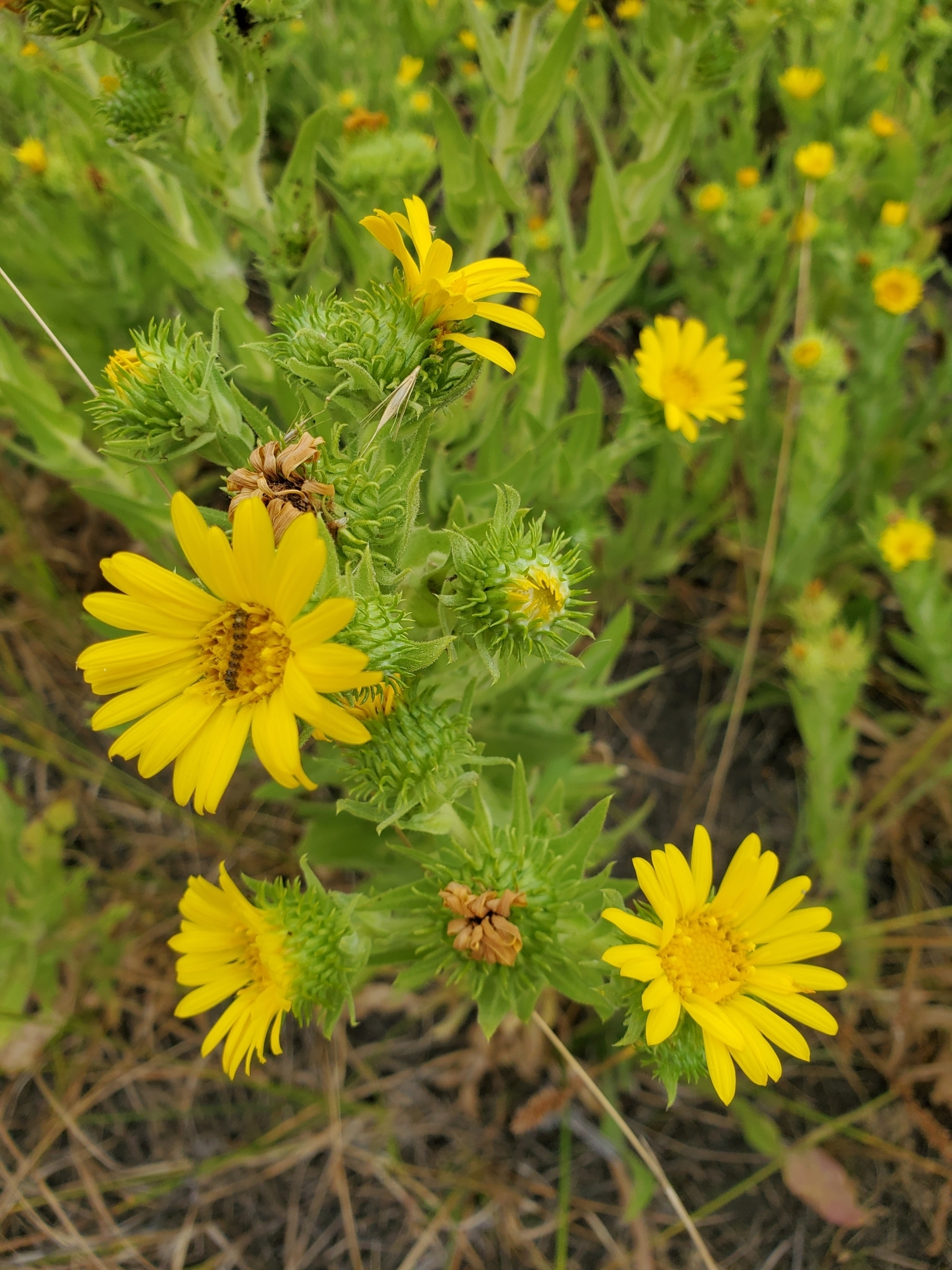

Scientific classification
- Kingdom: Plantae
- Clade: Tracheophytes
- Clade: Angiosperms
- Clade: Eudicots
- Clade: Asterids
- Order: Asterales
- Family: Asteraceae
- Genus: Grindelia
- Species: G. integrifolia

Binomial name
- Grindelia integrifolia DC.

Synonyms
- Grindelia villosa Douglas ex Sweet; Grindelia virgata Nutt.

= Grindelia integrifolia =

Species of flowering plant

Grindelia integrifolia, common name Puget Sound gumweed, is a plant species known only from Oregon, Washington and British Columbia. It grows in wet meadows and marshlands.

== Description ==
Grindelia integrifolia is a tall perennial herb up to 100 cm (40 in). It has narrow, lanceolate leaves up to 8 cm (3 in) long and yellow flower heads arranged like a corymb.
