= Grindelia aggregata =

Scientific classification
- Kingdom: Plantae
- Clade: Tracheophytes
- Clade: Angiosperms
- Clade: Eudicots
- Clade: Asterids
- Order: Asterales
- Family: Asteraceae
- Genus: Grindelia
- Species: G. aggregata

Binomial name
- Grindelia aggregata Steyerm. 1934

Species of aquatic plant

Grindelia aggregata is a rare North American species of flowering plants in the family Asteraceae. It is native to western Canada, found only in salt marshes and tidal flats along the seacoast in the southern part of Vancouver Island in British Columbia.

Grindelia aggregata is a branching herb up to 60 cm (2.0 ft) tall. Leaves are thick and leathery, up to 10 cm (3.9 in) long, with no hairs on the faces of the leaf but a few along the edges. Flower heads are about 4 cm (1.6 in) across, each containing 23-33 yellow ray flowers surrounding numerous small disc flowers.
