= Grindelia decumbens =

Conservation status
- Apparently Secure (NatureServe)

Scientific classification
- Kingdom: Plantae
- Clade: Tracheophytes
- Clade: Angiosperms
- Clade: Eudicots
- Clade: Asterids
- Order: Asterales
- Family: Asteraceae
- Genus: Grindelia
- Species: G. decumbens

Binomial name
- Grindelia decumbens Greene 1896

Synonyms
- Grindelia hirsutula var. decumbens (Greene) Ackerf.; Grindelia decumbens var. subincisa (Greene) Steyermark; Grindelia subincisa Greene

Species of flowering plant

Grindelia decumbens, the reclined gumweed, is a North American species of flowering plants in the family Asteraceae. It is native to the southwestern United States, in the States of New Mexico and Colorado.

Grindelia decumbens grows on dry hills and plains, and along streambanks. It is a perennial herb up to 80 cm (31 in) tall. The plant usually produces numerous flower heads in open, branching arrays. Each head has 12-24 ray flowers, surrounding a large number of tiny disc flowers.
