= Grindelia microcephala =

Scientific classification
- Kingdom: Plantae
- Clade: Tracheophytes
- Clade: Angiosperms
- Clade: Eudicots
- Clade: Asterids
- Order: Asterales
- Family: Asteraceae
- Genus: Grindelia
- Species: G. microcephala

Binomial name
- Grindelia microcephala DC. 1836 not Rothr. 1850

Species of flowering plant

Grindelia microcephala, the littlehead gumweed, is a North American species of flowering plants in the family Asteraceae. It is native to the south-central United States, having been found only in the state of Texas.

Grindelia microcephala grows in rich bottom lands along streams. It is an annual herb up to 40 cm (16 in) tall. The plant usually produces numerous flower heads in open, flat-topped arrays. Each head has 16-27 ray flowers, surrounding a large number of tiny disc flowers.
