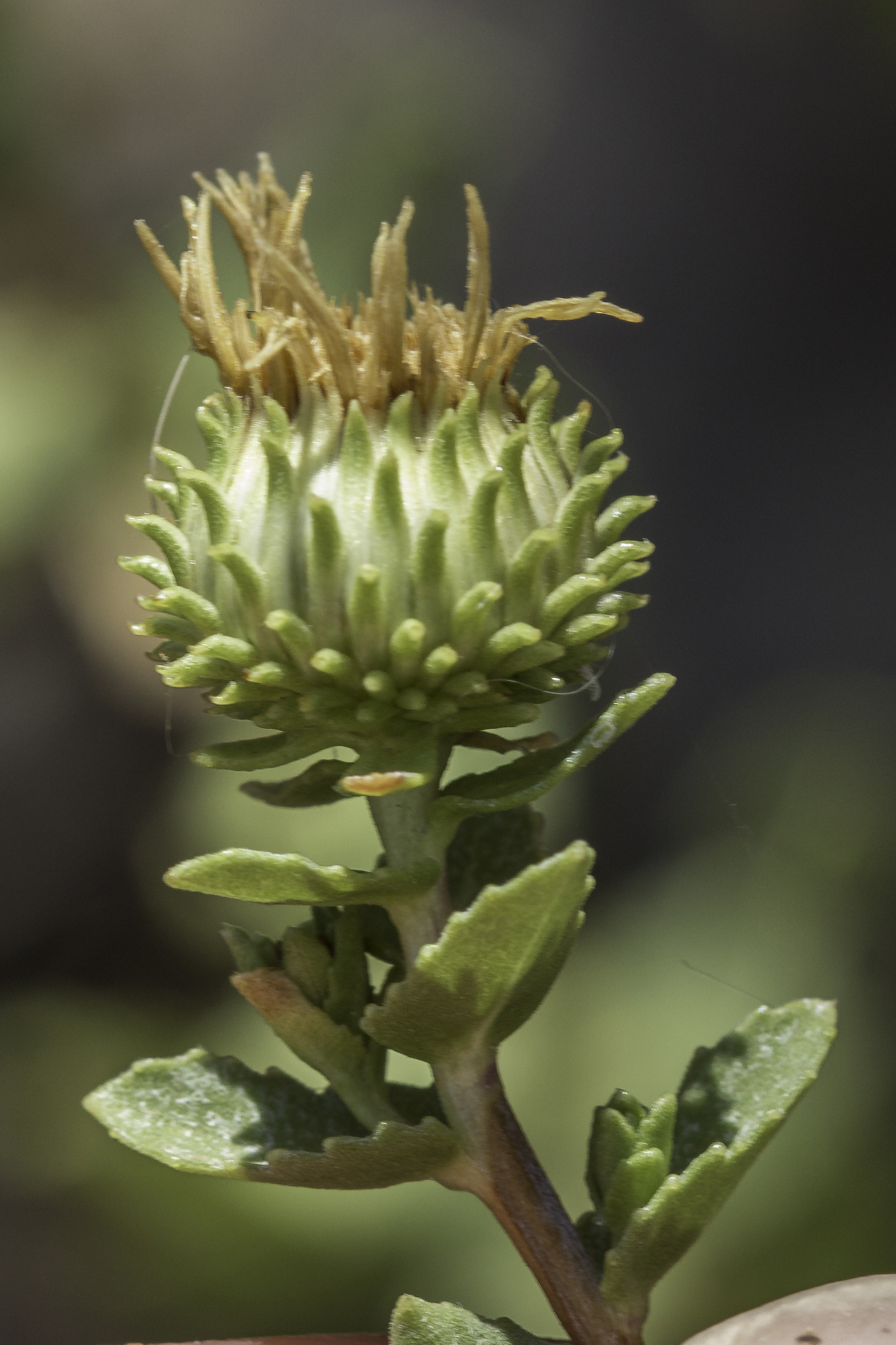

Scientific classification
- Kingdom: Plantae
- Clade: Tracheophytes
- Clade: Angiosperms
- Clade: Eudicots
- Clade: Asterids
- Order: Asterales
- Family: Asteraceae
- Genus: Grindelia
- Species: G. havardii

Binomial name
- Grindelia havardii Steyerm. 1934

= Grindelia havardii =

Species of flowering plant

Grindelia havardii, or Havard's gumweed, is a North American species of flowering plants in the family Asteraceae. It is native to the south-central United States, in the states of Texas and New Mexico.

Grindelia havardii grows in open, sunny sites on rocky slopes and in alluvial deposits. It is a perennial herb sometimes as much as 150 cm (5 feet) tall. The plant usually produces numerous flower heads in crowded, flat-topped arrays. Each head has 18-25 ray flowers, surrounding a large number of tiny disc flowers.
