= Grindelia macvaughii =

Scientific classification
- Kingdom: Plantae
- Clade: Tracheophytes
- Clade: Angiosperms
- Clade: Eudicots
- Clade: Asterids
- Order: Asterales
- Family: Asteraceae
- Genus: Grindelia
- Species: G. macvaughii

Binomial name
- Grindelia macvaughii G.L.Nesom 1990

Species of flowering plant

Grindelia macvaughii is a North American species of flowering plants in the family Asteraceae. It is native to the central Mexico, in the eastern part of the State of Jalisco.

Grindelia macvaughii grows in grasslands and pastures, often with desert shrubs. It is a biennial or perennial herb up to 90 cm (3 feet) tall. The plant usually produces one flower head one per flower stalk. Each head has 15-20 ray flowers, surrounding a large number of tiny disc flowers.
