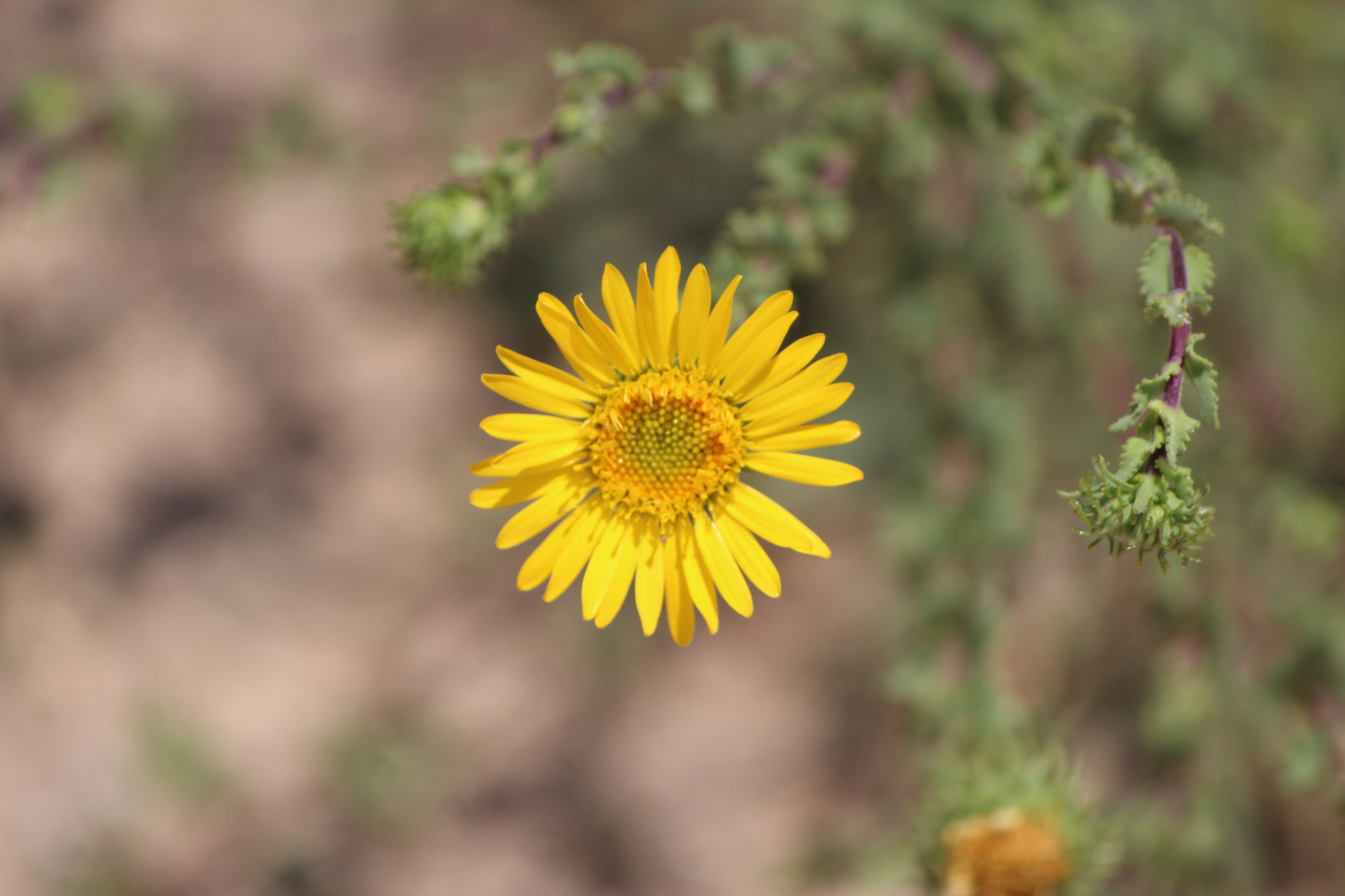

Scientific classification
- Kingdom: Plantae
- Clade: Tracheophytes
- Clade: Angiosperms
- Clade: Eudicots
- Clade: Asterids
- Order: Asterales
- Family: Asteraceae
- Genus: Grindelia
- Species: G. subdecurrens

Binomial name
- Grindelia subdecurrens DC. 1836

= Grindelia subdecurrens =

Species of flowering plant

Grindelia subdecurrens is a North American species of flowering plants in the family Asteraceae. It is native to the north-central Mexico, in the States of Aguascalientes, Zacatecas, Guanajuato, and San Luis Potosí.
