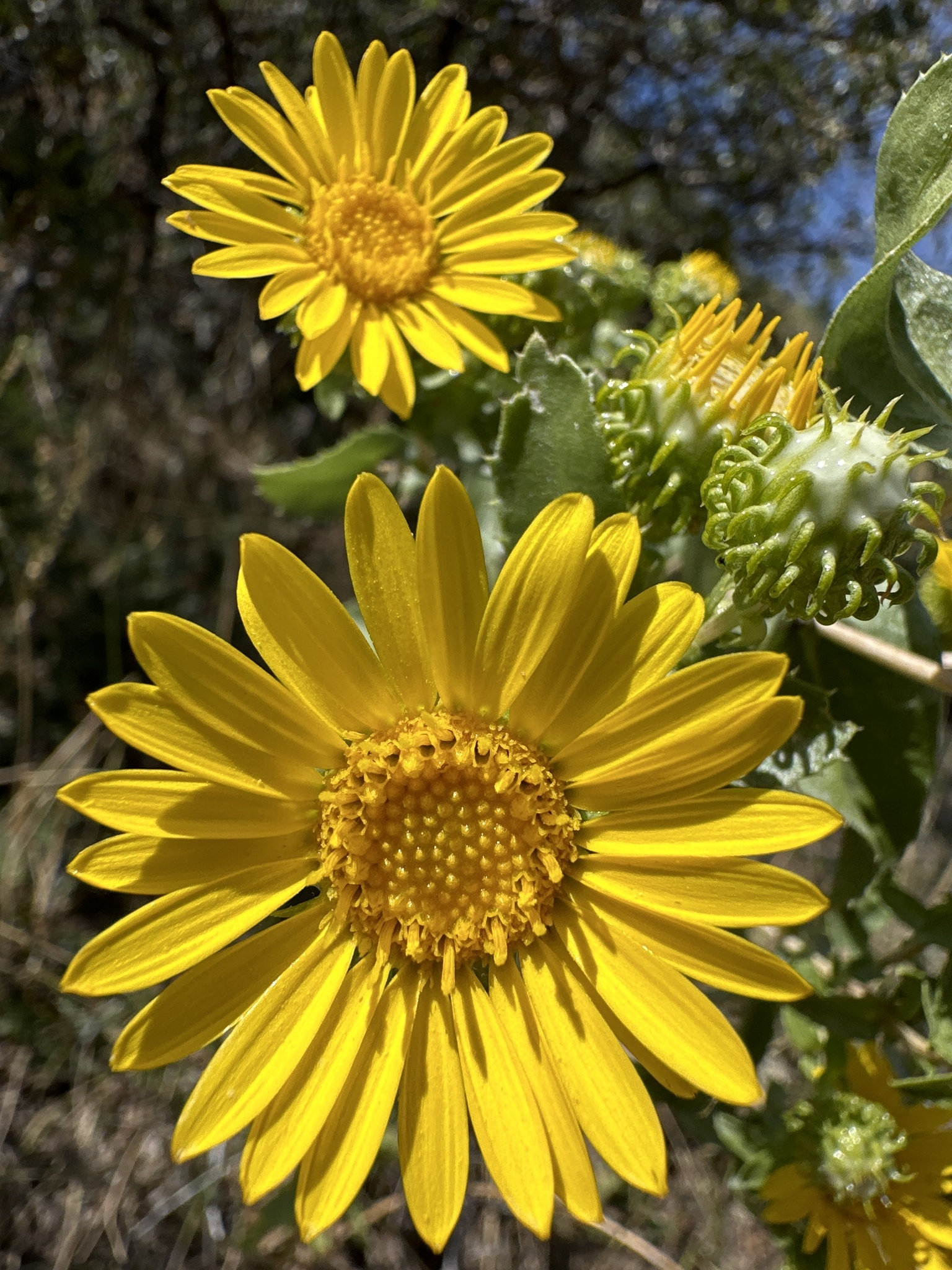

Conservation status
- Apparently Secure (NatureServe)

Scientific classification
- Kingdom: Plantae
- Clade: Tracheophytes
- Clade: Angiosperms
- Clade: Eudicots
- Clade: Asterids
- Order: Asterales
- Family: Asteraceae
- Genus: Grindelia
- Species: G. subalpina

Binomial name
- Grindelia subalpina Greene 1898

Synonyms
- Grindelia eldorae Daniels; Grindelia erecta A.Nelson; Grindelia platylepis Greene

= Grindelia subalpina =

Species of flowering plant

Grindelia subalpina, the subalpine gumweed, is a North American species of flowering plants in the Astereae tribe of the family Asteraceae.

== Distribution ==
The plant is native to the Rocky Mountains, in Wyoming, Colorado, and New Mexico.

It grows in open rocky or gravelly sites in the Rocky Mountains.

== Description ==
Grindelia subalpina is a biennial, or perennial herb up to 60 cm (2 feet) tall.

The plant usually produces numerous flower heads in open branching arrays. Each head has 18-27 ray flowers, surrounding a large number of tiny disc flowers.

=== Varieties ===
- Grindelia subalpina var. erecta — endemic to Colorado and Wyoming.
- Grindelia subalpina var. subalpina
