= Grindelia hintoniorum =

Scientific classification
- Kingdom: Plantae
- Clade: Embryophytes
- Clade: Tracheophytes
- Clade: Spermatophytes
- Clade: Angiosperms
- Clade: Eudicots
- Clade: Asterids
- Order: Asterales
- Family: Asteraceae
- Genus: Grindelia
- Species: G. hintoniorum

Binomial name
- Grindelia hintoniorum G.L.Nesom 1990

Species of flowering plant

Grindelia hintoniorum is a rare North American species of flowering plants in the family Asteraceae. It is native to northeastern Mexico, found only in the State of Nuevo León.

Grindelia hintoniorum is a small perennial herb with numerous stems arising from the base but unbranched above ground, each stem up to 15 cm (5.9 in) tall. The plant produces only one flower head per flower stalk, each head about 10–12 mm (0.39–0.47 in) wide. Each head has 19-34 ray flowers surrounding many disc flowers.
