= Grindelia vetimontis =

Scientific classification
- Kingdom: Plantae
- Clade: Tracheophytes
- Clade: Angiosperms
- Clade: Eudicots
- Clade: Asterids
- Order: Asterales
- Family: Asteraceae
- Genus: Grindelia
- Species: G. vetimontis

Binomial name
- Grindelia vetimontis G.L.Nesom 1990

Species of flowering plant

Grindelia vetimontis is a rare North American species of flowering plants in the family Asteraceae. It is native to northeastern Mexico, found only in the State of Nuevo León.

Grindelia vetimontis is a perennial herb up to 50 cm (20 in) tall, forming a thick underground rhizome. The plant produces only one flower head per stem, the head 15–18 mm (0.59–0.71 in) across. Each head has 22-24 ray flowers surrounding numerous disc flowers.
