= Grindelia oolepis =

Scientific classification
- Kingdom: Plantae
- Clade: Tracheophytes
- Clade: Angiosperms
- Clade: Eudicots
- Clade: Asterids
- Order: Asterales
- Family: Asteraceae
- Genus: Grindelia
- Species: G. oolepis

Binomial name
- Grindelia oolepis S.F.Blake 1928

Synonyms
- Grindelia oölepis S.F.Blake

Species of flowering plant

Grindelia oolepis, the plains gumweed, is a North American species of flowering plants in the family Asteraceae. It is native to the south-central United States, having been found only in the State of Texas.

Grindelia oolepis grows in black clay soils. It is a perennial herb up to 70 cm (28 in) tall. The plant usually produces only one flower head per stem. Each numerous disc flowers but no ray flowers.

Some authors spell the epithet as oölepis, with two dots over the second o to indicate that each o is to be pronounced in a separate syllable. The dots are optional; either spelling is equally correct.
