= Grindelia oaxacana =

Scientific classification
- Kingdom: Plantae
- Clade: Tracheophytes
- Clade: Angiosperms
- Clade: Eudicots
- Clade: Asterids
- Order: Asterales
- Family: Asteraceae
- Genus: Grindelia
- Species: G. oaxacana

Binomial name
- Grindelia oaxacana G.L.Nesom. 1990

Synonyms
- Grindelia microcephala var. montana Steyerm. 1934 not Grindelia montana Phil. 1894

Species of flowering plant

Grindelia oaxacana is a rare North American species of flowering plants in the family Asteraceae. It is native to southwestern Mexico, found only in the State of Oaxaca.

Grindelia oaxacana is an herb 40 cm (16 in) tall or sometimes taller, with stems covered with glandular hairs. Leaves are oblong or egg-shaped, up to 5 cm long even high on the stem, thus larger than the leaves of related species. The plant produces only one flower head per stem, the head about 18–22 mm (0.71–0.87 in) across. Each head has 16-22 ray flowers surrounding numerous disc flowers.
