= Grindelia obovatifolia =

Scientific classification
- Kingdom: Plantae
- Clade: Tracheophytes
- Clade: Angiosperms
- Clade: Eudicots
- Clade: Asterids
- Order: Asterales
- Family: Asteraceae
- Genus: Grindelia
- Species: G. obovatifolia

Binomial name
- Grindelia obovatifolia S.F.Blake 1942

Species of flowering plant

Grindelia obovatifolia is a North American species of flowering plants in the family Asteraceae. It is native to northeastern Mexico, found only the State of Nuevo León.
