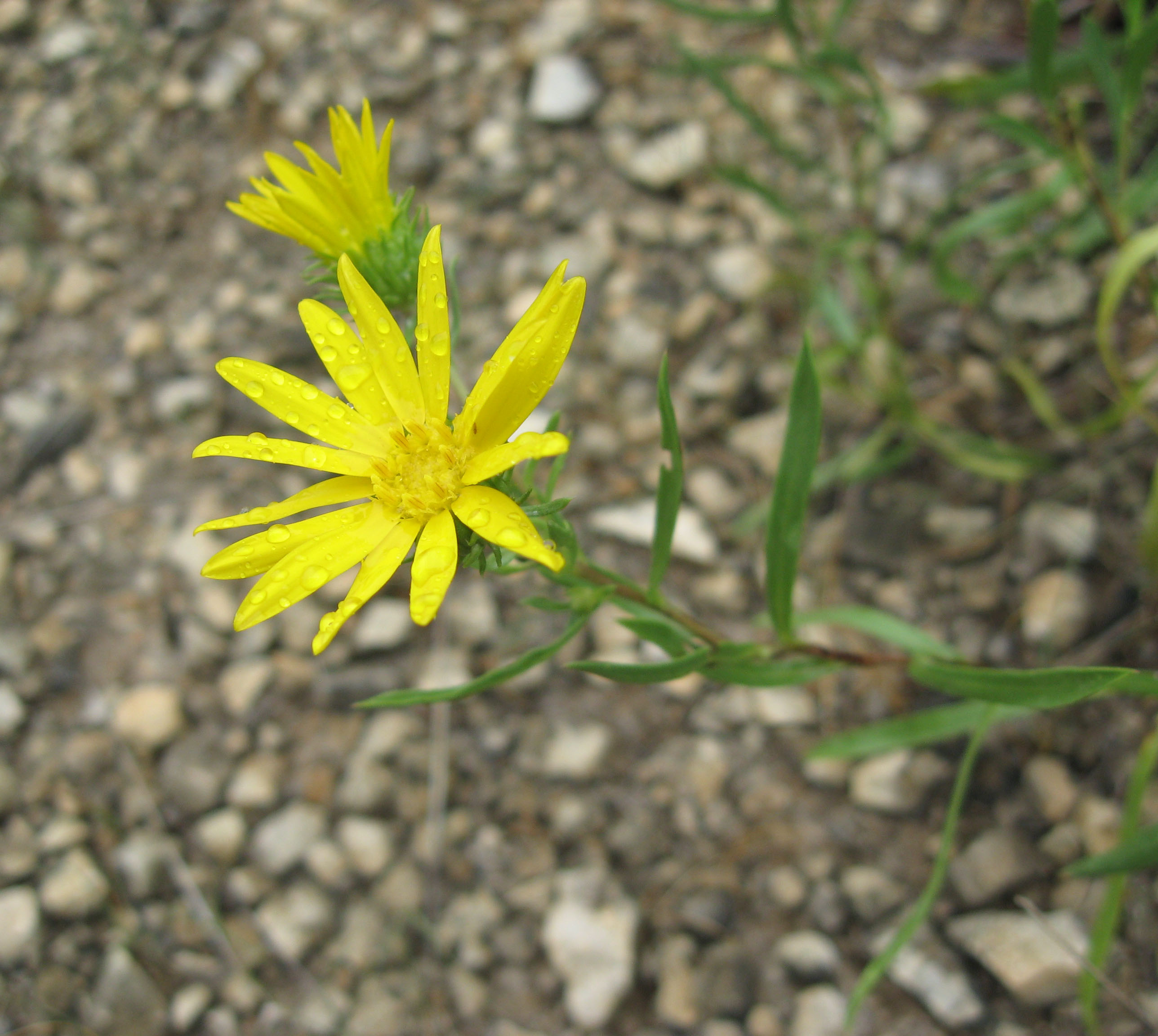

Conservation status
- Apparently Secure (NatureServe)

Scientific classification
- Kingdom: Plantae
- Clade: Tracheophytes
- Clade: Angiosperms
- Clade: Eudicots
- Clade: Asterids
- Order: Asterales
- Family: Asteraceae
- Genus: Grindelia
- Species: G. lanceolata

Binomial name
- Grindelia lanceolata Nutt. 1834

Synonyms
- Grindelia littoralis Steyerm.; Grindelia texana Scheele; Grindelia greenei Steyerm.

= Grindelia lanceolata =

Species of flowering plant

Grindelia lanceolata is a species of flowering plant in the family Asteraceae known by the common name narrow-leaf gumweed.

== Distribution ==
Grindelia lanceolata is native to the south-central United States, primarily in the Ozarks, the Interior Low Plateaus, the southern Great Plains (Texas, Oklahoma, New Mexico, Colorado), and Northeastern Mexico. There are also isolated populations (some of them apparently naturalized) in New Mexico, Colorado, Wisconsin, Ohio, Virginia, South Carolina, and Connecticut.

The species' preferred habitat is limestone glades and rocky prairies.

== Description ==
Grindelia lanceolata is a short-lived monocarpic perennial up to 150 cm (5 feet) tall. Leaves are up to 11 cm (4.4 inches) long, generally with no hairs or only a few hairs. The plant produces yellow flower heads in the summer, usually in flat-topped arrays but sometimes only one per flower stalk. Each head contains 12-36 ray flowers surrounding numerous disc flowers.
