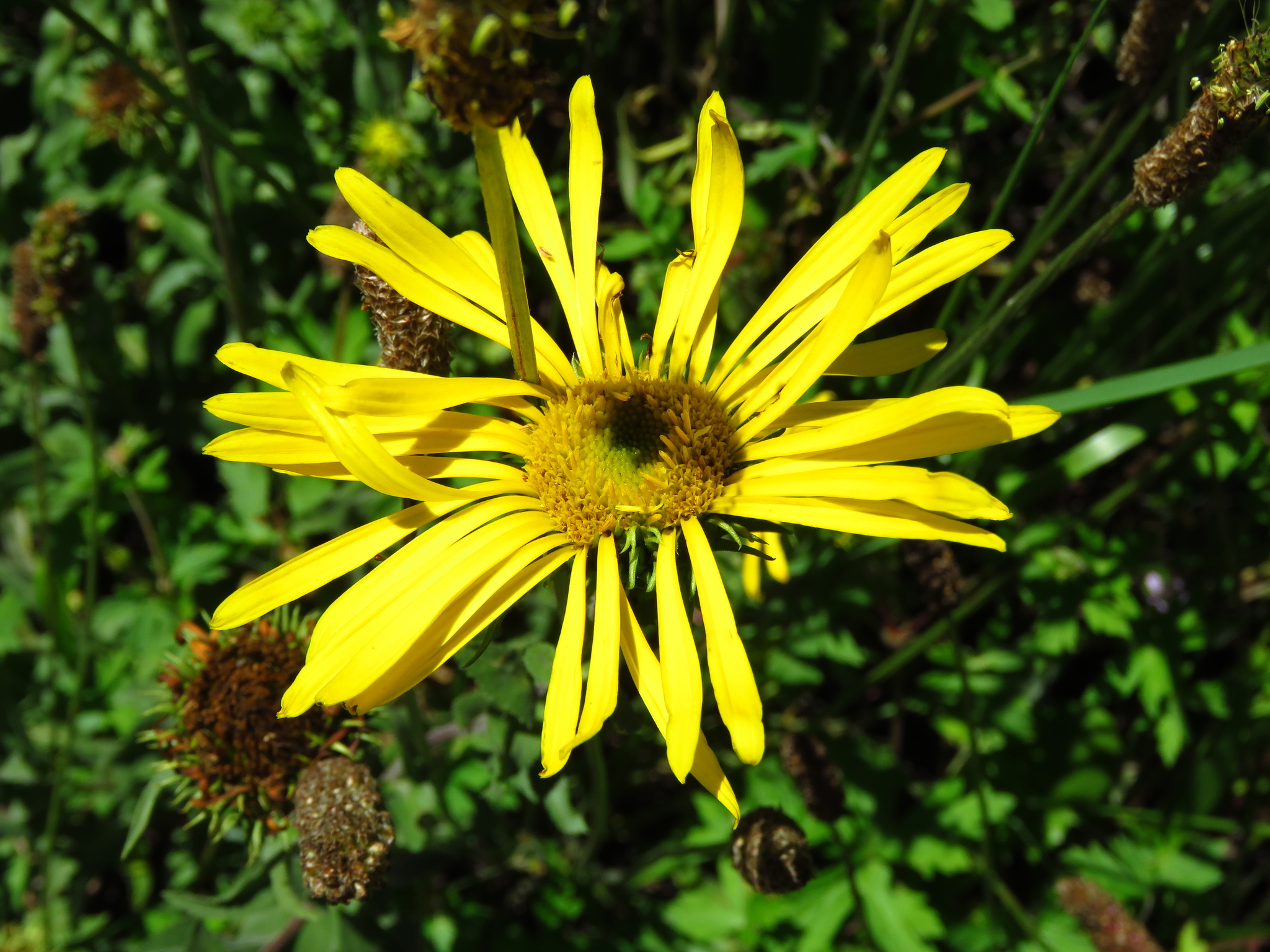

Scientific classification
- Kingdom: Plantae
- Clade: Tracheophytes
- Clade: Angiosperms
- Clade: Eudicots
- Clade: Asterids
- Order: Asterales
- Family: Asteraceae
- Genus: Grindelia
- Species: G. greenmanii

Binomial name
- Grindelia greenmanii Steyerm. 1934

= Grindelia greenmanii =

Species of flowering plant

Grindelia greenmanii is a North American species of flowering plant in the family Asteraceae. It is native to northeastern Mexico, found in the States of Coahuila, Nuevo León, and Tamaulipas.
