= Grindelia arizonica =

Conservation status
- Apparently Secure (NatureServe)

Scientific classification
- Kingdom: Plantae
- Clade: Tracheophytes
- Clade: Angiosperms
- Clade: Eudicots
- Clade: Asterids
- Order: Asterales
- Family: Asteraceae
- Genus: Grindelia
- Species: G. arizonica

Binomial name
- Grindelia arizonica A.Gray 1882

Synonyms
- Grindelia laciniata Rydb.; Grindelia neomexicana Wooton & Standl.

Species of plant

Grindelia arizonica, the Arizona gumweed, is a North American species of flowering plants in the family Asteraceae. It is native to the southwestern United States and northern Mexico, in the States of Coahuila, Chihuahua, Arizona, New Mexico, Utah, Texas, and Colorado.

Grindelia arizonica grows in prairies and thickets, and along streambanks. It is a perennial herb up to 70 cm (28 in) tall. The plant usually produces numerous flower heads in open, branching arrays. Each head has 8-26 ray flowers, although some individuals have no rays. In the center of the head, there are a large number of tiny disc flowers.
