= Grindelia palmeri =

Scientific classification
- Kingdom: Plantae
- Clade: Tracheophytes
- Clade: Angiosperms
- Clade: Eudicots
- Clade: Asterids
- Order: Asterales
- Family: Asteraceae
- Genus: Grindelia
- Species: G. palmeri

Binomial name
- Grindelia palmeri Steyerm. 1934

Species of flowering plant

Grindelia palmeri is a rare North American species of flowering plants in the family Asteraceae. It is native to northeastern Mexico, found only in the State of San Luis Potosí.

Grindelia palmeri is a herb up to 50 cm (20 in) tall, with numerous leafy stems sprouting from the base but generally not branching above ground level. The plant produces only one flower head per stem, the head 30–40 mm (1.2–1.6 in) across. Each head has 35-30 ray flowers surrounding numerous disc flowers.
