= Grindelia sublanuginosa =

Scientific classification
- Kingdom: Plantae
- Clade: Tracheophytes
- Clade: Angiosperms
- Clade: Eudicots
- Clade: Asterids
- Order: Asterales
- Family: Asteraceae
- Genus: Grindelia
- Species: G. sublanuginosa

Binomial name
- Grindelia sublanuginosa Steyerm. 1934

Species of flowering plant

Grindelia sublanuginosa is a North American species of flowering plants in the family Asteraceae. It is native to western Mexico, found only in the State of Jalisco.

Grindelia sublanuginosa is a branching herb up to 40 cm (16 in) tall. Leaves are olive-green, up to 35 mm (1.4 in) long, with small teeth along the edges. Flower heads contain 8-21 yellow or yellow-orange ray flowers surrounding numerous small disc flowers. The achenes are distinctive in the genus in being tetragonal.
