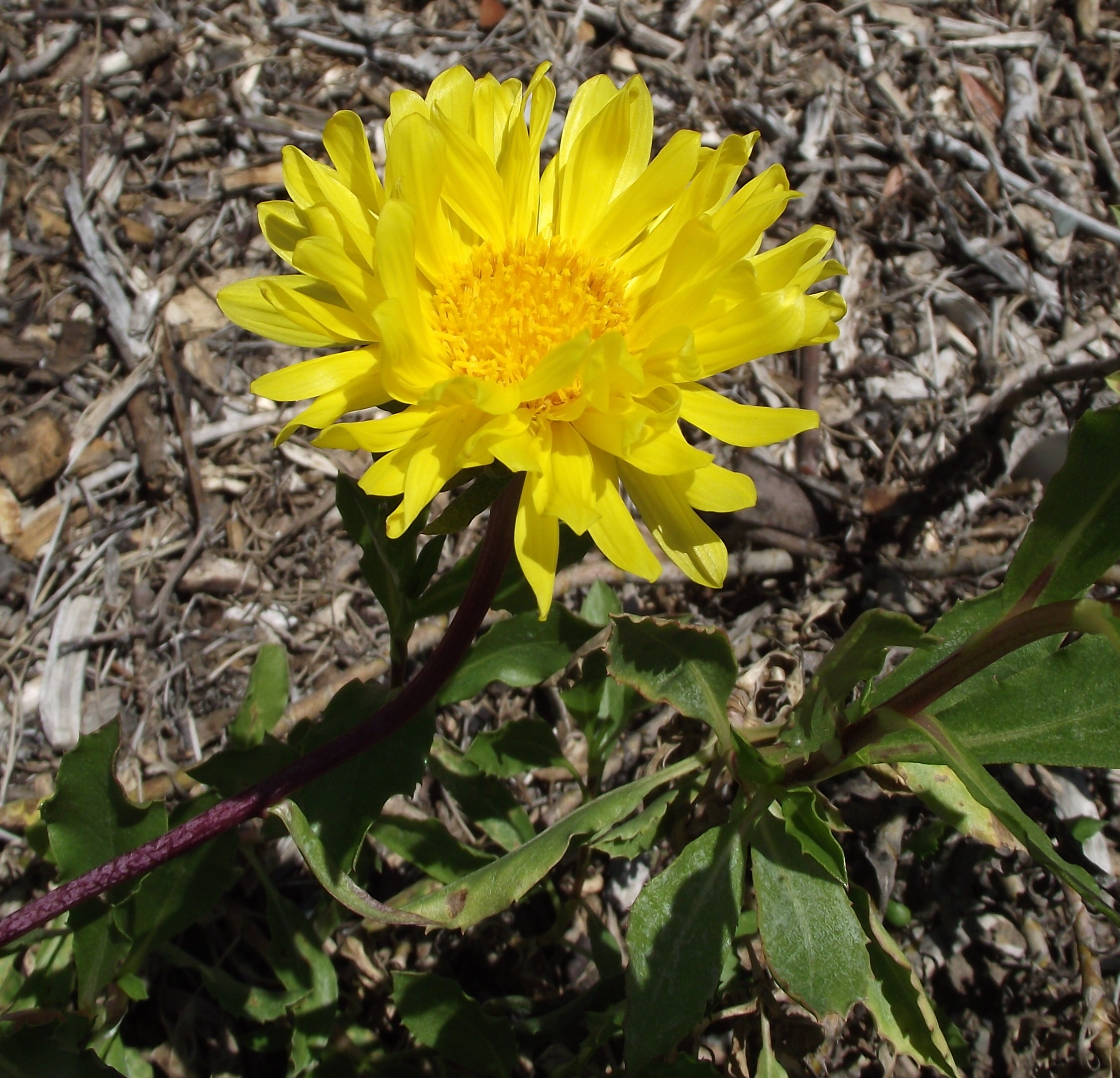
- A young plant
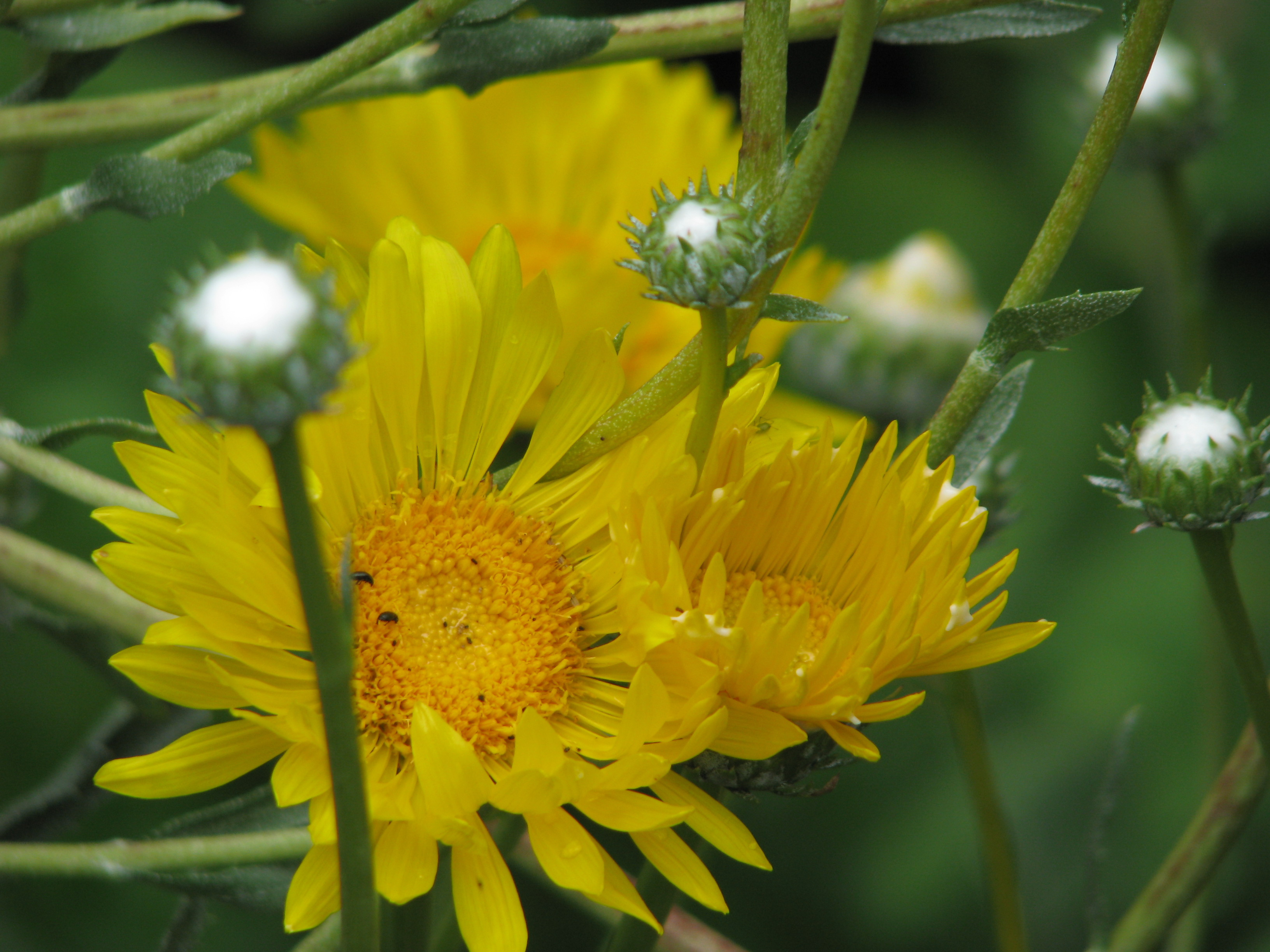
- Flower buds are covered in resin

Scientific classification
- Kingdom: Plantae
- Clade: Tracheophytes
- Clade: Angiosperms
- Clade: Eudicots
- Clade: Asterids
- Order: Asterales
- Family: Asteraceae
- Genus: Grindelia
- Species: G. chiloensis

Binomial name
- Grindelia chiloensis (Cornel.) Cabrera

Synonyms
- List: Aster hoorebekia Kuntze; Grindelia foliosa Hook. & Arn.; Grindelia resinosa Gillies ex Hook. & Arn.; Grindelia speciosa Lindl. & Paxton; Grindelia speciosa var. integrifolia Speg.; Grindelia volkensii Kuntze; Grindelia volkensii var. angustifolia Kuntze; Grindelia volkensii var. latifolia Kuntze; Haplopappus hoorebekia DC.; Helianthus australis Phil.; Hoorebekia chiloensis Cornel.

= Grindelia chiloensis =

Species of plant

Grindelia chiloensis, the shrubby gumweed, is a species of flowering plant in the family Asteraceae, native to central and southern Chile, and Argentina. A perennial shrub adapted to arid areas, its dried leaves can contain up to 25% resin, so efforts are being made to bring into cultivation for resin and biomass production.
