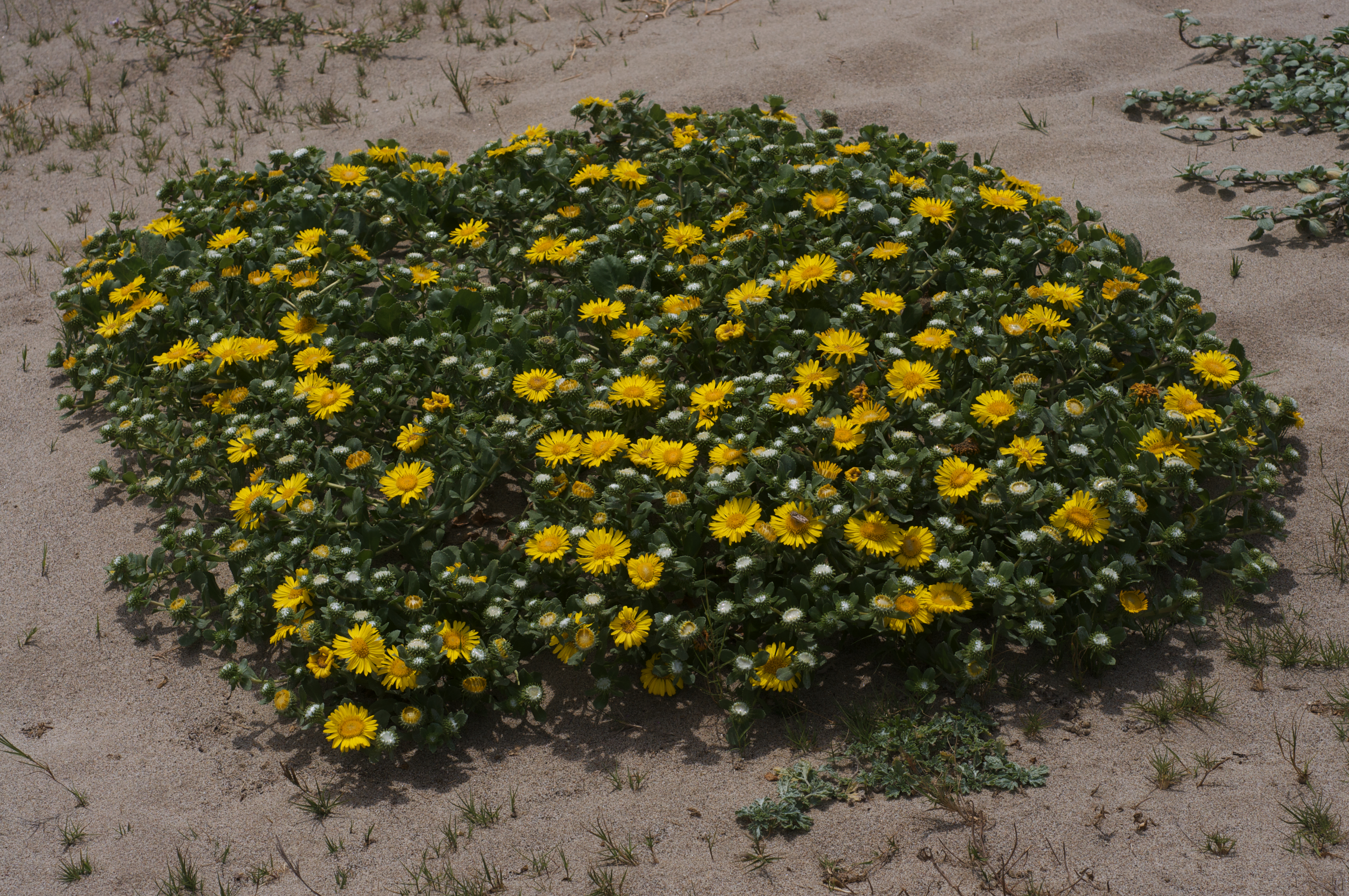

Scientific classification
- Kingdom: Plantae
- Clade: Tracheophytes
- Clade: Angiosperms
- Clade: Eudicots
- Clade: Asterids
- Order: Asterales
- Family: Asteraceae
- Genus: Grindelia
- Species: G. stricta

Binomial name
- Grindelia stricta DC.

= Grindelia stricta =

Species of flowering plant

Grindelia stricta is a species of flowering plant in the family Asteraceae known by the common names Oregon gumplant, Oregon gumweed and (in Britain and Ireland) coastal gumplant. It is native to the west coast of North America from California to Alaska, where it is a resident of coastal plant communities such as those in marshes and beaches. This plant is variable in appearance, taking the form of a weedlike perennial herb forming low clumps to a sprawling subshrub growing erect to heights exceeding one meter. Its foliage and stems are green to rusty red or purplish and the plant may be hairy to hairless. The fleshy leaves are green, often with red edges and veining, and are up to 15 centimeters in length on large plants. The inflorescence holds one or more flower heads each up to 5 centimeters wide. The flower head is a cup of thick erect or recurved green phyllaries. Yellow disc florets fill the center of the flower head and there is a fringe of yellow ray florets around the circumference. The head produces copious amounts of white latex, especially in the early stages of blooming.
