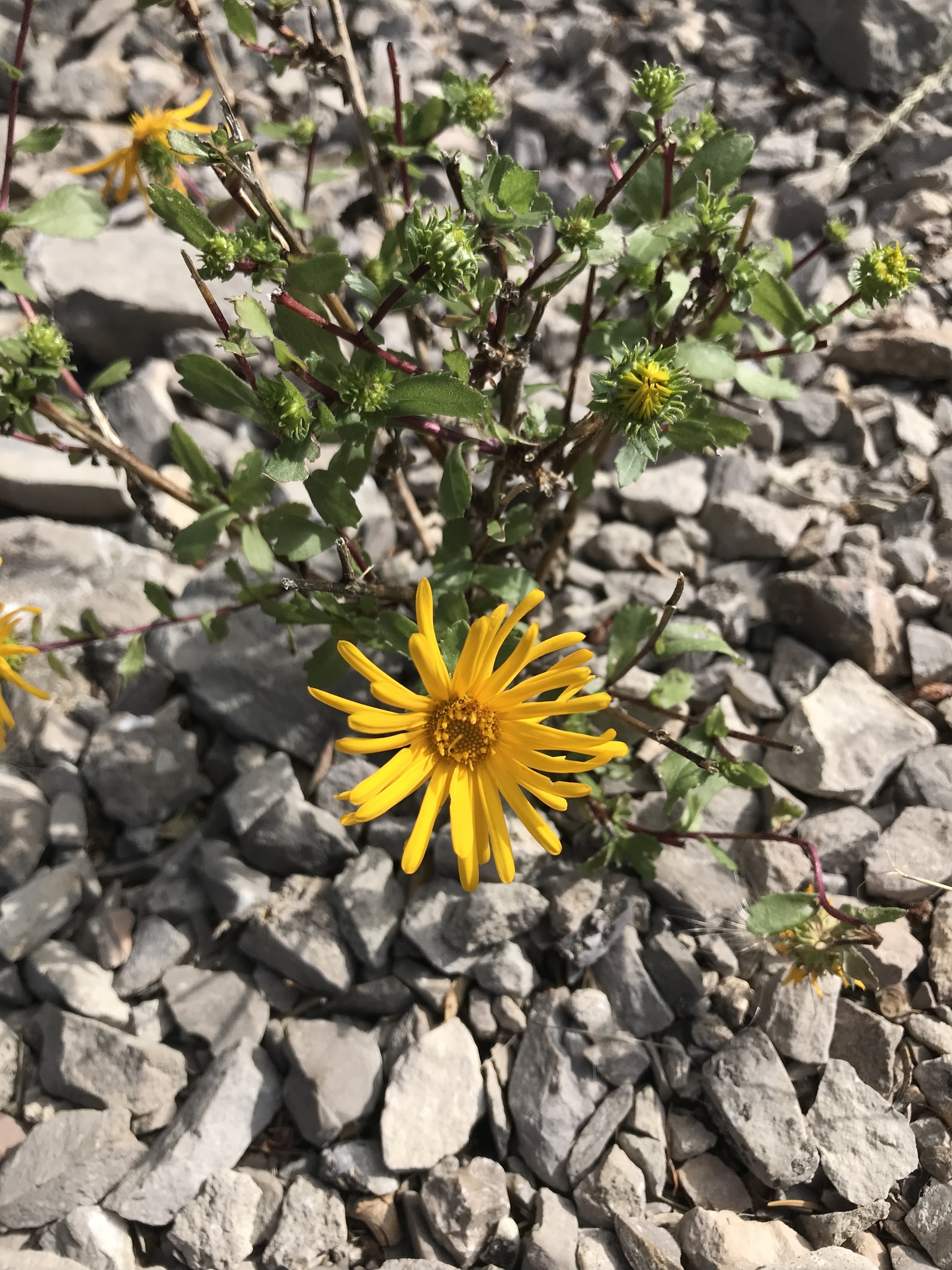

Scientific classification
- Kingdom: Plantae
- Clade: Tracheophytes
- Clade: Angiosperms
- Clade: Eudicots
- Clade: Asterids
- Order: Asterales
- Family: Asteraceae
- Genus: Grindelia
- Species: G. scabra

Binomial name
- Grindelia scabra Greene 1898

= Grindelia scabra =

Species of flowering plant

Grindelia scabra, the rough gumweed, is a rare North American species of flowering plants in the family Asteraceae. It has been found in northern Mexico (Coahuila) and the southwestern United States (western Texas and southern New Mexico).

Grindelia scabra grows in dry rocky slopes and on top of mesas (flat-topped hills). It is an annual, biennial, or perennial herb up to 70 cm (28 in) tall. The plant usually produces numerous flower heads in open flat-topped arrays. Each head has 17-30 ray flowers, surrounding a large number of tiny disc flowers.
