= Donyo =

Donyo is a given name and nickname. Notable people with this name include the following:

- Donyo Donev (1929 – 2007), Bulgarian animator, director, art director, comics artist and cartoonist
- Donyo Dorje (1463 – 1512), Tibetan prince
- Donyo Kuzmanov, nickname for Anton Kuzmanov (born 1918), Bulgarian footballer
- Jamyang Donyo Gyaltsen (1310 - 1344), Tibetan ruler

== See also ==
- Dondo (disambiguation)
- Dongo (disambiguation)
- Donya (disambiguation)
