= Grindelia howellii =

Scientific classification
- Kingdom: Plantae
- Clade: Tracheophytes
- Clade: Angiosperms
- Clade: Eudicots
- Clade: Asterids
- Order: Asterales
- Family: Asteraceae
- Genus: Grindelia
- Species: G. howellii

Binomial name
- Grindelia howellii Steyerm. 1934

Species of flowering plant

Grindelia howellii, or Howell's gumweed, is a North American species of flowering plants in the family Asteraceae. It is native to the northwestern United States, in the States of Idaho and Montana.

Grindelia howellii grows in open, sunny sites on rocky slopes and in alluvial deposits. It is a perennial herb sometimes as much as 150 cm (5 feet) tall. The plant usually produces numerous flower heads in crowded, flat-topped arrays. Each head has 18-25 ray flowers, surrounding a large number of tiny disc flowers.
