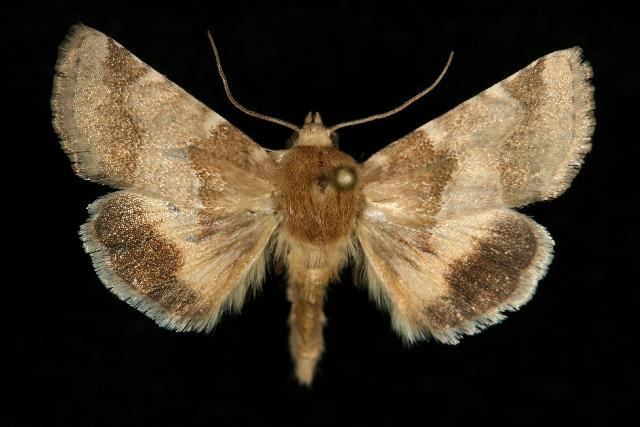

Scientific classification
- Domain: Eukaryota
- Kingdom: Animalia
- Phylum: Arthropoda
- Class: Insecta
- Order: Lepidoptera
- Superfamily: Noctuoidea
- Family: Noctuidae
- Genus: Schinia
- Species: S. mortua

Binomial name
- Schinia mortua Grote, 1865

= Schinia mortua =

Species of moth

Schinia mortua is a moth of the family Noctuidae. It is found in most of the western half of North America.

The wingspan is 23–27 mm.

The larvae feed on Grindelia and Haplopappus.
