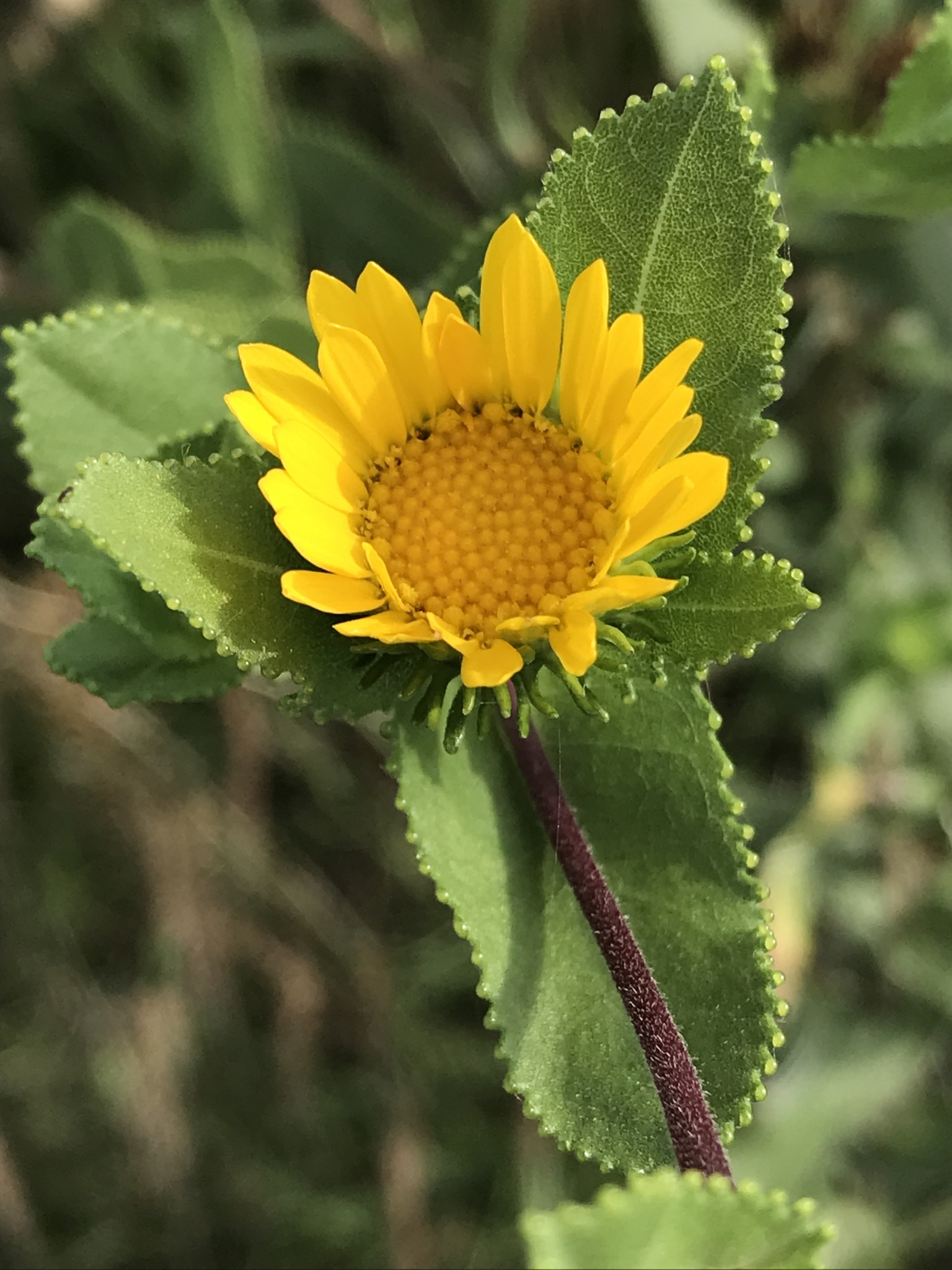

Scientific classification
- Kingdom: Plantae
- Clade: Tracheophytes
- Clade: Angiosperms
- Clade: Eudicots
- Clade: Asterids
- Order: Asterales
- Family: Asteraceae
- Genus: Grindelia
- Species: G. adenodonta

Binomial name
- Grindelia adenodonta (Steyerm.) G.L.Nesom 1992

Synonyms
- Grindelia microcephala var. adenodonta Steyerm. 1934

= Grindelia adenodonta =

Species of flowering plant

Grindelia adenodonta, the Lonestar gumweed, is a species of flowering plants in the family Asteraceae.

Grindelia adenodonta is native to the southern Great Plains of the United States, found only in the state of Texas.

Grindelia adenodonta grows in prairies and thickets, and along streambanks. It is an annual herb up to 130 cm (52 inches or 4 1/3 feet) tall. Leaves are narrowly egg-shaped or triangular, up to 9 cm (3.6 inches) long. The plant usually produces numerous flower heads in open, branching arrays. Each head has 20-27 ray flowers surrounding a large number of tiny disc flowers.
