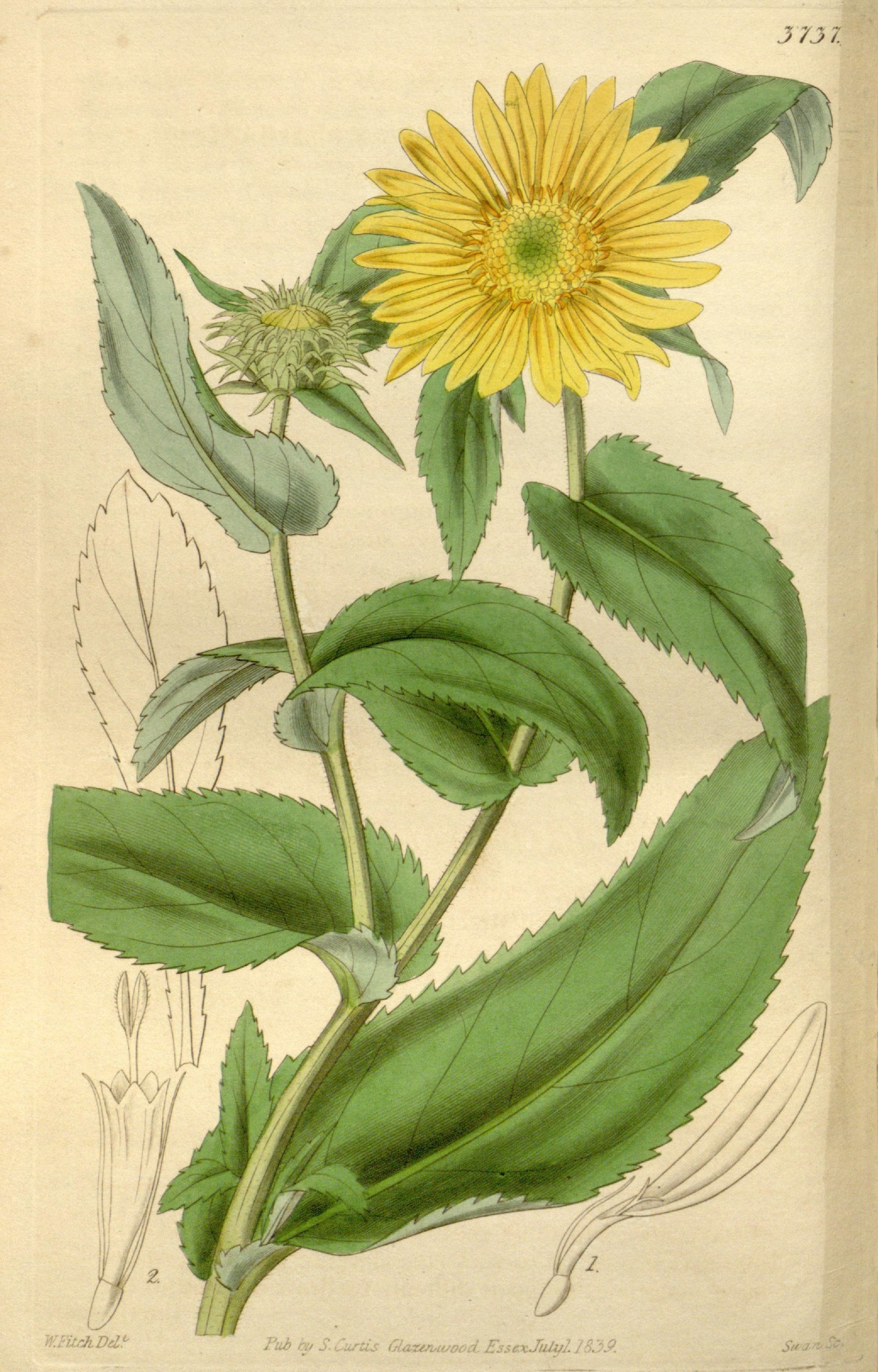

Scientific classification
- Kingdom: Plantae
- Clade: Tracheophytes
- Clade: Angiosperms
- Clade: Eudicots
- Clade: Asterids
- Order: Asterales
- Family: Asteraceae
- Genus: Grindelia
- Species: G. inuloides

Binomial name
- Grindelia inuloides Willd. 1807

Synonyms
- Synonymy: Aster serratus Lag. ex DC.; Aster spathularis Brouss. ex DC.; Aster spathularis Lag. ex Nees; Aster squarrosus Sessé & Moc. 1890 not All. 175; Demetria spathulata Lag.; Donia inuloides Hook.; Grindelia angustifolia Kunth; Grindelia arguta Schrad. ex DC.; Grindelia spathulata Biv. ex Link; Grindelia glandulosa Greenm.

= Grindelia inuloides =

Species of flowering plant

Grindelia inuloides is a North American species of flowering plants in the family Asteraceae. It is widespread across much of Mexico, from Nuevo León to Oaxaca.
