= Dondo Dam =

Dam in Hyōgo Prefecture, Japan

Coordinates: 34°46′24.0″N 135°04′18.0″E

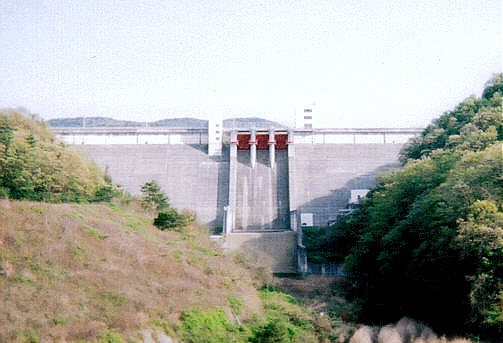
- Interactive map of Dondo Dam
- Location: Hyōgo Prefecture, Japan.
- Construction began: 1968
- Opening date: 1989

Dam and spillways
- Impounds: Shijimi River
- Height: 71.5 m
- Length: 260 m

Reservoir
- Total capacity: 18,860,000 m^{3}
- Catchment area: 329.5 km^{2}
- Surface area: 105 hectares

Dondo Dam (呑吐ダム) is a dam in Miki, Hyōgo Prefecture, Japan. Catching the waters of the Sijimi and Yamada rivers, the catchment becomes known as Tsukuhara Lake.

== Uses ==
Other than just creating hydro electricity the catchment area of 328.8km2 provides drinking water supply and industrial supply to nearby Kobe; as well as irrigation, flood control, removal of melting snow and recreational uses.
