= Khawla Dunia =

Khawla Dunia خولة دُنْيا
- Born: August 2, 1968 (age 58); Damascus, Syria
- Education: Economics, Damascus University
- Occupations: Poet, Humanitarian Aid Worker, Journalist, Researcher
- Website: facebook.com/kh.m.dunia

Khawla Dunia (Arabic: خولة دنيا) is a Syrian poet, journalist, researcher and humanitarian aid and relief organizer from Damascus, Syria, although her family is originally from the Hama Province of Syria. A self-proclaimed atheist, she is of Alawite background.

She is a recipient of the Human Rights and Humanitarian work award from the Lew Kopelew Organization in Germany. From 2000 to 2002, she was a member of the Committee of Defending Human Rights- Amarji Magazine. She has published several studies, including "Syrian Women between Reality and Ambition, Report on the Damascus Declaration Detainees" (2008), and reports on elections and political issues. In 2009, she wrote a report about the detainees of Damascus Spring.

She is President of the Board of Directors of The Syrian Humanitarian Relief and Development Institute Najda Now in Syria. She wrote a chapter about Syrian women and the revolution in Larissa Bender (Hg.), Syrien, Der Schwierige Weg in die Freiheit (Syria, The Difficult Path to Freedom). In 2012, during the revolution, she published a collection of poems entitled, "Overhasty Poems Before the Missile Falls," Amarji Magazine.

In 2013, she wrote a chapter about Syria in a book called "Writing Revolution, Voices From Tunis to Damascus," a PEN translation award winner. She is one of the founders of Najda Now, a relief organization that provides shelter and humanitarian aid to displaced people in the Syrian civil war.

Dunia and her husband, Jalal Nawfal, a psychiatrist, have been arrested twice by Syrian security. Under pursuit by the Syrian government since October 2011, because of her writings, research, participation in demonstrations, and relief work, she fled illegally to Lebanon in April 2013. She is currently working with refugees in Lebanon, in the Bekaa camps, trying to improve the lives of the refugees. Her husband is still being detained in Syria.

Dunia has spoken about women's goals in the Syrian revolution, and how it "is a revolution against all taboos." She has also spoken about the changing nature of the conflict, and how women have been marginalized as the conflict has changed from civic, peaceful protests to militarized conflict. In her words, "women are like spices for men in the political opposition. They use us to add some flavor, but we do not affect the main ingredients. I refuse to take part in this cooking, as long as I am not considered an active participant."
