= Dunya al-Amal Ismail =

Palestinian poet, journalist and researcher

- دنيا الأمل إسماعيل
- Born: 1971 (age 54–55); Gaza Strip
- Education: Hebrew University of Jerusalem; Cairo University; Al-Azhar University – Gaza
- Occupations: Poet, journalist
- Children: 4

Dunya al-Amal Ismail (Arabic: دنيا الأمل إسماعيل; also transliterated as Dunyā, Donia, and Dunia; born 1971 in Gaza) is a Palestinian poet, journalist, researcher, and feminist.

== Early life and education ==
Al-Amal Ismail was born in the Gaza Strip, but her family relocated to Egypt in 1981. She attended Al-Arish Girls’ School, where she began her political activism by organizing a photo exhibition at her school at the inception of the First Intifada in 1987. Her father, who was politically involved, encouraged her activism.

Al-Amal Ismail holds a degree in journalism and communication from the University of Jerusalem, a degree in Arabic from Egypt's Cairo University, and a master's degree in political science from Gaza's Al-Azhar University.

== Career ==
Al-Amal Ismail began her journalism career in Egypt. She worked for Al-Haqiqa newspaper, where she became their first female editor-in-chief. She later worked for Al-Ghaida magazine. She was also a cultural writer for the newspapers Al-Hayat and Al-Ayyam, publishing interviews with authors and analysis of published works.

She has lived in the Gaza Strip since 1994. After her return, she published the book I Saw in Gaza, which was later censored by the Palestinian Authority in 1999.

She has written on women's issues and feminism since 2000, and has spoken on women's issues at events as well. Al-Amal Ismail has encouraged Palestinian solidarity with Kurdish women. However, Al-Amal Ismail has also said she sometimes feels pigeonholed by the media, and has received pushback from news agencies for wanting to discuss politics more generally, rather than with an emphasis on women. She has published some of her more general political analysis through the Center for Arab Unity Studies.

She has worked and written for the Institute for Palestine Studies, the Palestinian Centre for Human Rights, Press House, and the United Nations Population Fund.

She is the director of the Gaza-based Creative Women's Association, which aims to support female creatives and cultural events.

=== Writing ===
Al-Amal Ismail has published three poetry collections: Each Separately (Arabic: كل على حدة) in 1996, The Ringing of Isolation (Arabic: رنين العزلة) in 1999, and Not Him in 2010.

Her poem "A Moment of Mourning" was published in the 2001 anthology The Poetry of Arab Women: A Contemporary Anthology. She has also been published in Magazine 28. In 2014, she was invited to read at the Poetic Interludes of Palestine, hosted by the Franco-Palestinian Cultural Institute in Paris.

Al-Amal Ismail is also the author of a short story anthology about the 2008-2009 Gaza War. Her fiction works have also been translated into English for Anthology of the Palestinian Story, which was published in Britain.

== Awards and honours ==
In 2016, Al-Amal Ismail won the French Mediterranean Women’s Forum Award for her story "My Mother and the Olive Tree". The story was subsequently translated into French. She was unable to attend the award ceremony in person after being turned away from the Rafah crossing from the Gaza Strip into Egypt.

In 2023, she shared second place in the National Library of Palestine's Research and Studies Award for her research project "Theater in Palestine: Hope and Challenges".

In 2024, al-Amal Ismail and fellow Gazan poet Elham Hamedi received the international and jury prize from the Spoltore Awards at its Festival scrittura d’amore.

== Personal life ==
Al-Amal Ismail was married to Bassam Al-Aqraa, an employee of the Palestinian Center for Human Rights. Al-Aqraa died of a heart attack in Jabalia in 2018, while Al-Amal Ismail was in Cairo; authorities refused to allow her to return to Gaza in time to see him. She has four children. In September 2024, she published a piece in The New Arab about her experiences of living in the Gaza Strip during the Gaza war.
