= Dunja (disambiguation) =

Dunja is a Serbian and Croatian feminine given name.

Dunja may also refer to:

- Dunja (film), a 1955 Austrian film
- Dunja, the Slovene name of Dogna, a municipality in Italy
- Lancia Fulvia Dunja, a concept car

== See also ==
- Dunja, du, a West German schlager song
- Dunya (disambiguation)
- Dunia (disambiguation)
