= Donya Aziz =

Pakistani politician

Member of the National Assembly of Pakistan
- In office 2002–2013

Donya Aziz is a Pakistani politician who has been a member of the National Assembly of Pakistan from 2002 to 2013.

== Political career ==
She was elected to the National Assembly of Pakistan as a candidate of Pakistan Muslim League (Q) on a seat reserved for women from Punjab in the 2002 Pakistani general election. During her tenure as Member of the National Assembly, she served as the federal Parliamentary Secretary for Population Welfare.

She was re-elected to the National Assembly of Pakistan as a candidate of Pakistan Muslim League (Q) on a seat reserved for women from Punjab in the 2008 Pakistani general election.
