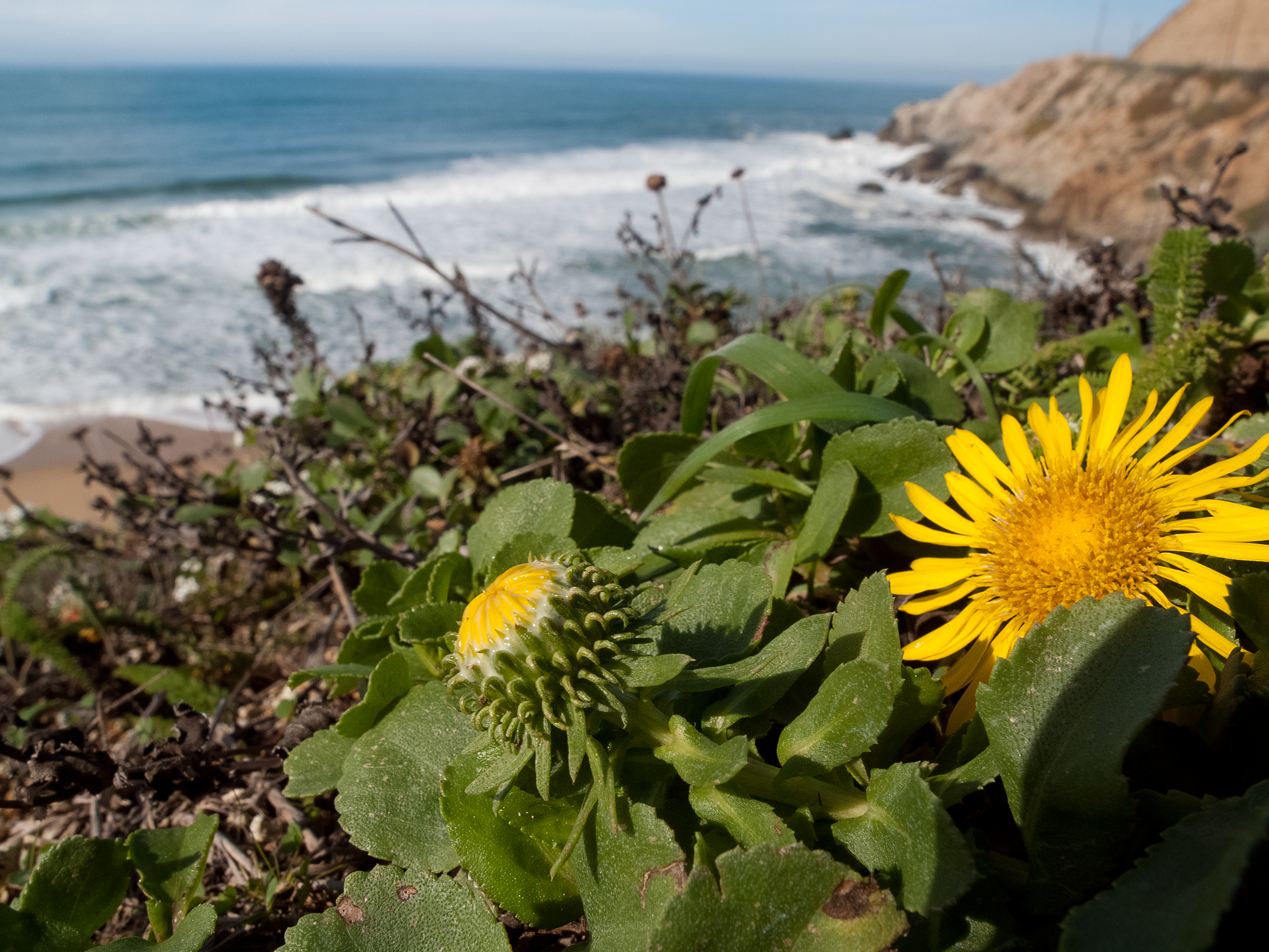

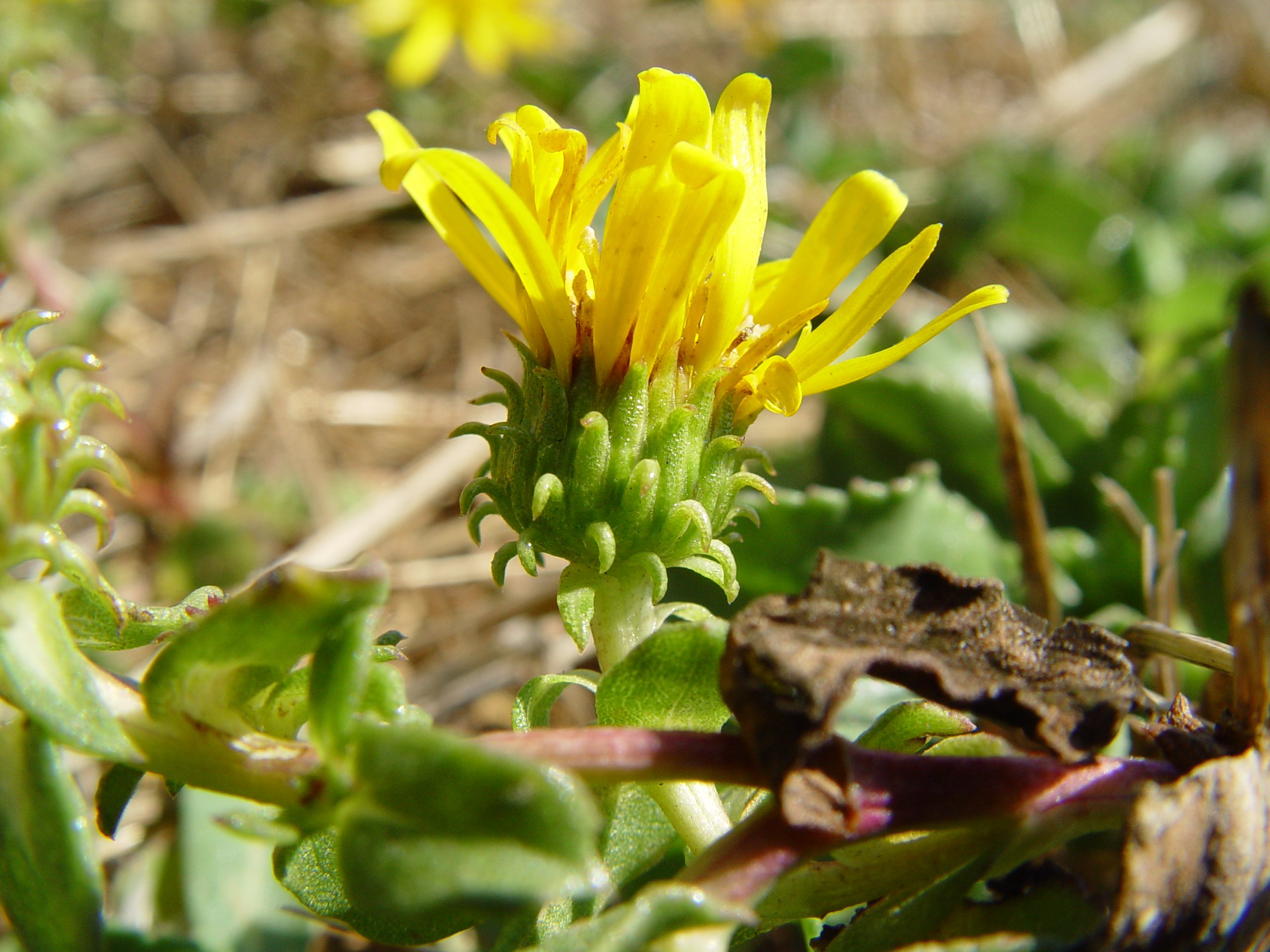

Conservation status
- Secure (NatureServe)

Scientific classification
- Kingdom: Plantae
- Clade: Tracheophytes
- Clade: Angiosperms
- Clade: Eudicots
- Clade: Asterids
- Order: Asterales
- Family: Asteraceae
- Genus: Grindelia
- Species: G. hirsutula

Binomial name
- Grindelia hirsutula Hook. & Arn. 1833

Synonyms
- Synonymy: Donia glutinosa Hook.; Grindelia acutifolia Steyerm.; Grindelia arenicola Steyerm.; Grindelia blakei Steyerm.; Grindelia bracteosa J.T.Howell; Grindelia brownii A.Heller; Grindelia camporum Greene; Grindelia collina J.K.Henry; Grindelia columbiana (Piper) Rydb.; Grindelia discoidea Nutt. 1840 not Hook. & Arn. 1836; Grindelia fastigiata Greene; Grindelia hallii Steyerm.; Grindelia hendersonii Greene; Grindelia humilis Hook. & Arn.; Grindelia inornata Greene; Grindelia integerrima Rydb.; Grindelia lanata Greene; Grindelia latifolia Kellogg; Grindelia macrophylla Greene; Grindelia maritima (Greene) Steyerm.; Grindelia nana Nutt.; Grindelia oregana A.Gray; Grindelia pacifica M.E.Jones; Grindelia paludosa Greene; Grindelia patens Greene; Grindelia paysonorum H.St.John; Grindelia perennis A.Nelson; Grindelia procera Greene; Grindelia revoluta Steyerm.; Grindelia rubricaulis DC.; Grindelia stricta DC.; Grindelia venulosa Jeps.; plus many more names at level of variety or form

= Grindelia hirsutula =

Species of flowering plant

Grindelia hirsutula is a North American species of flowering plant in the family Asteraceae known by the common names hairy gumplant and hairy gumweed.

== Distribution ==
Grindelia hirsutula is native to North America, widespread across Canada and in California and Oregon. The species is highly variable, and many local populations have been named as varieties or as distinct species. All these taxa do, however, intergrade with one another.

== Description ==
Grindelia hirsutula is an erect perennial herb or subshrub sometimes as much as 2.5 m (8 ft) tall but usually much shorter. The plant is usually green but the stems are often red or purplish-brown and the leaves can be somewhat yellowish to reddish.

The plant can produce numerous flower heads in branching arrays at the top of the plant. Each head is 2–3 cm (3/4–1 1/4 in) wide with hemispheric cups of greenish phyllaries around the base, the bracts claw-like and bent away from the flowers. The center of the head is filled with many small yellow disc florets surround by numerous golden ray florets. The head produces a thick white exudate, especially in new flower heads.

=== Varieties ===
- Grindelia hirsutula var. maritima — San Francisco Gum Plant, San Francisco gumplant, coastal gumweed; endemic to coastal California in the San Francisco Bay Area.
