= Donya Dadrasan =

Iranian singer (born 2001)

Donya Dadrasan دنیا دادرسان
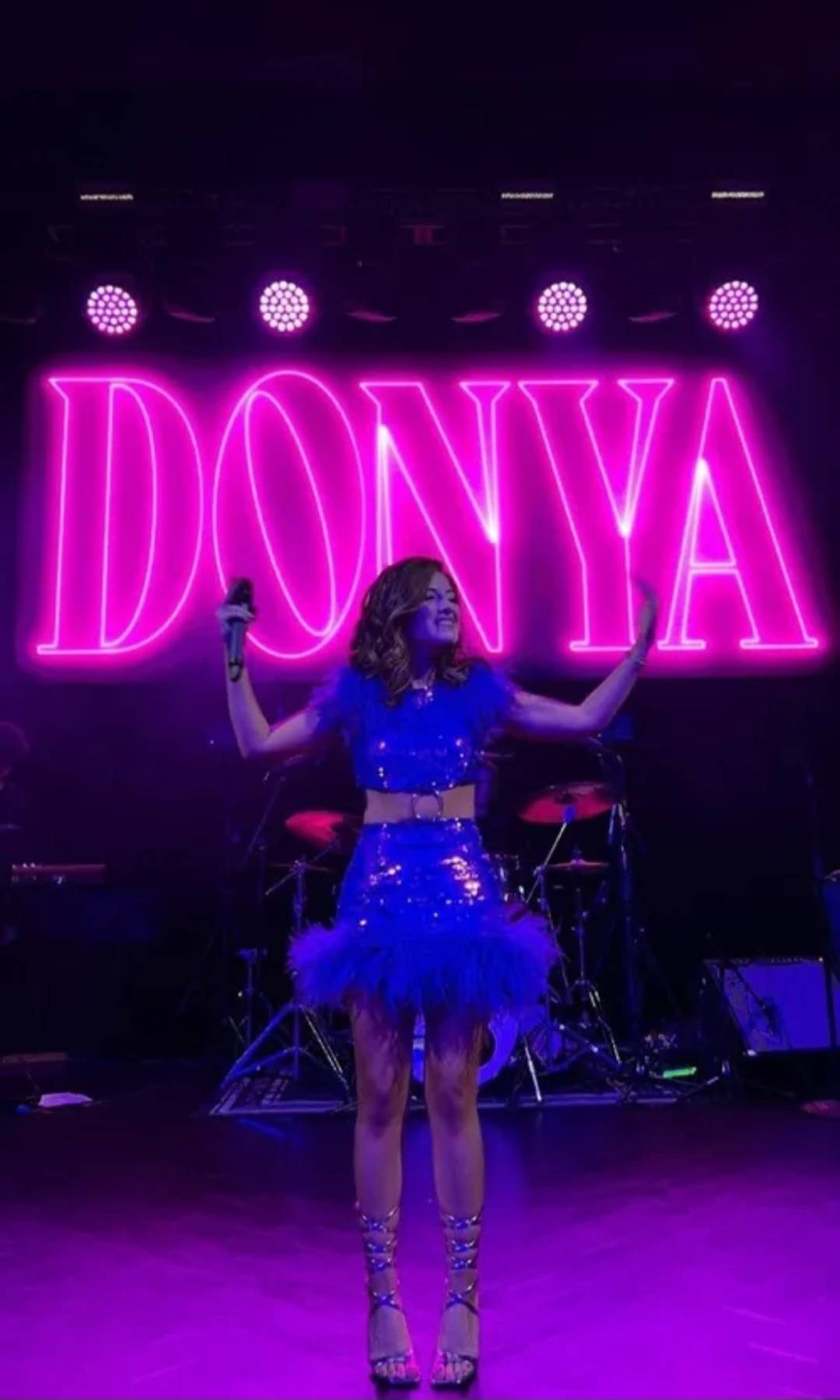
- Dadrasan in 2023

Background information
- Born: 15 March 1998 (age 28); Tehran, Iran
- Genre: Pop
- Instrument: Piano
- Years active: 2014–present
- Label: Radio Javan ( 2017 - 2024 )
- Partner: Bardia Zadeh ( 2024- present )
- Website: donyadadrasan.com

Donya Dadrasan (born 15 March 1998) is an Iranian singer. Donya currently resides in Melbourne, Australia. She lives in a family of 4 and is currently married to "Bardia Zadeh". She has a mother named Noushin and a younger brother named Danial.

== Early life ==
Donya was born on 15 March 2001 in Punak, Tehran. At the age of 7, she appeared in the series Khat Sefid, a work by the Iranian Children and Youth Group, and in a short film called Paul. Between the ages of 8 and 12, she began learning piano from Farah Asanloo, one of Anoushiravan Rohani's students, and began playing professionally at the age of 15. One of Dadrasan's advantages for progressing in music was her family, for whom music was one of their daily and main activities.

Dadrasan immigrated to Kuala Lumpur, Malaysia, with her family in 2010 at the age of 12, and two years later, at the age of 14, she moved to Melbourne, Australia, and began singing there at the age of 16. In 2015, as Instagram became more popular among Iranians, she quickly became famous by posting dubs of Iranian and foreign songs on her Instagram page.

== Career ==
Dadrasan's career started in the Australian Academy and she began her first singing career in the group Senik. Her first song recorded in Australia was with the group Senik, which was called "Golden Dreams". Dadrasan's second song was an anthem for the national team, which attracted the attention of a number of Iranian singers and presenters, including Sina Valiollah, Max Amini, and the Voice of America network. She left the group after 9 months due to differences of opinion.

In August 2017, she released her first independent song, "Midoni Douset Daram." In April 2018, a few days after her 20th birthday, she released a song titled "Az In Shahr Boro," which was well received and marked the official beginning of her professional career.

Dadrasan's songs "Koo Ta Biad" received over 43 million plays on Radio Javan and 6 million views on YouTube, and "Amo Hassan" received over 60 million plays on Radio Javan.

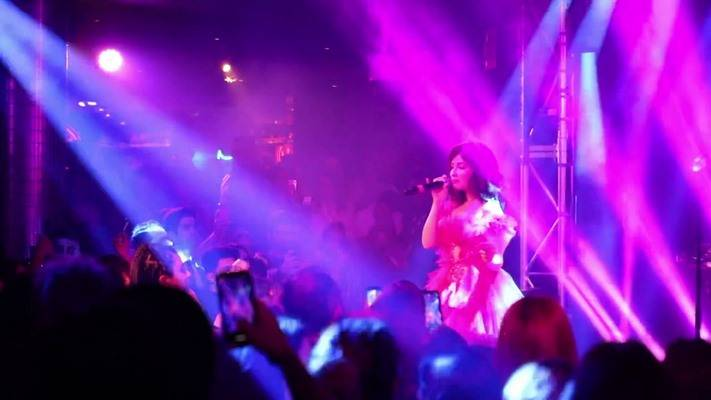
Dadrasan performing in Los Angeles (2023)

During the Iranian uprising of 2022, Dadrasan cut her hair short to show solidarity and protest against the repression of the people and protesters in Iran and the death of Mahsa Amini, which received widespread media coverage.
