= Donia, Guinea =

Human settlement in Guinea

Coordinates: 09°56′00″N 12°20′00″W

Donia is a town in southwestern Guinea. It is near the border with Sierra Leone.

== Transport ==
- Railway stations in Guinea
