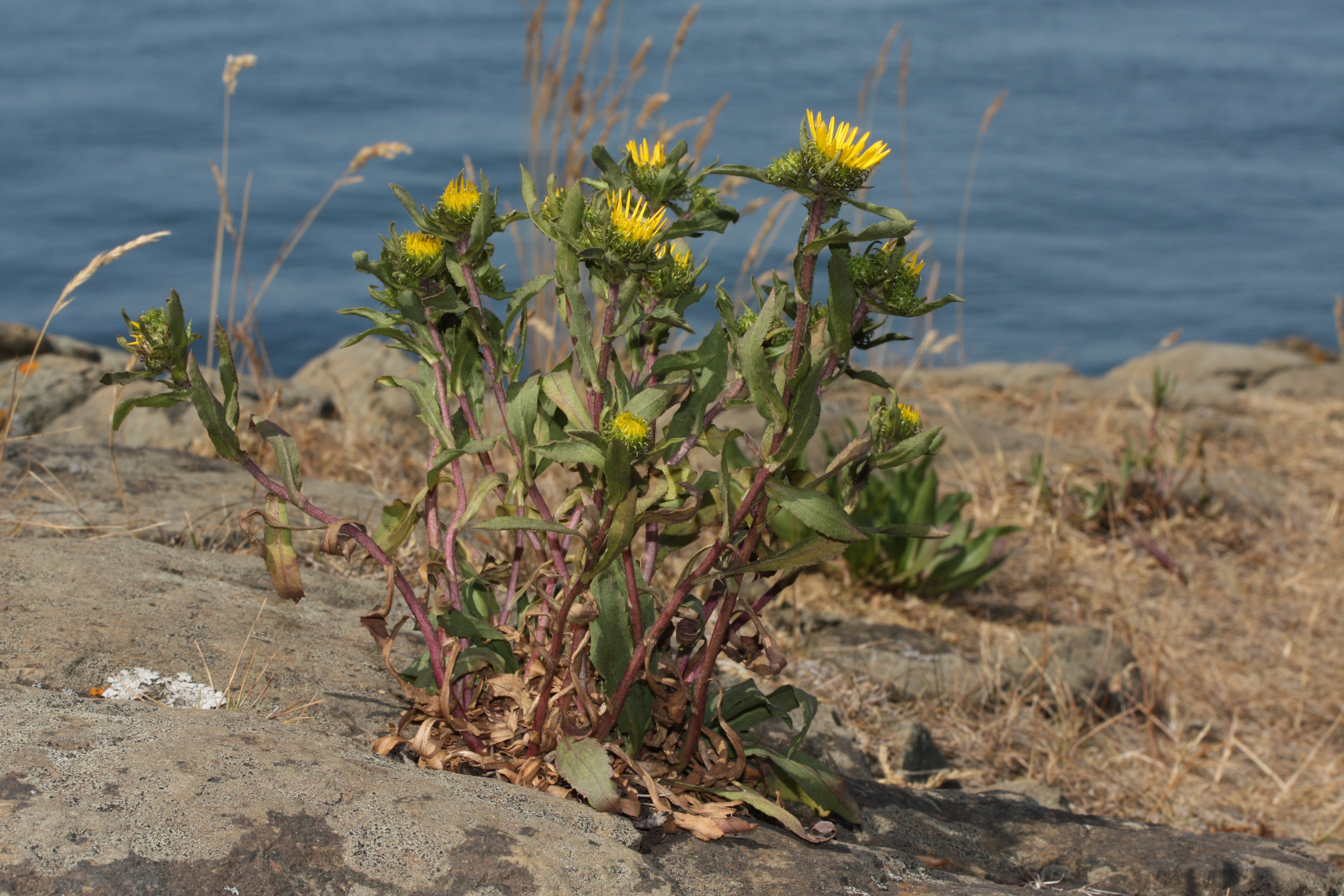
- Puget Sound gumweed (Grindelia integrifolia)

Scientific classification
- Kingdom: Plantae
- Clade: Embryophytes
- Clade: Tracheophytes
- Clade: Spermatophytes
- Clade: Angiosperms
- Clade: Eudicots
- Clade: Asterids
- Order: Asterales
- Family: Asteraceae
- Subfamily: Asteroideae
- Tribe: Astereae
- Subtribe: Machaerantherinae
- Genus: Grindelia; Willd. (1807)

Type species
- Grindelia inuloides Willd. (1807)

Synonyms
- Aurelia Cass.; Demetria Lag.; Donia R.Br.; Doniana Raf., nom. superfl.; Golionema S.Watson; Hoorebekia Cornel.; Oligonema S.Watson, nom. illeg.; Olivaea Sch.Bip. ex Benth.; Prionopsis Nutt.; Thuraria Nutt. in J.Fraser, nom. illeg.

= Grindelia =

Gumweeds

Genus of flowering plants

Grindelia (gumweed) is a genus of plants native to the Americas belonging to the family Asteraceae. The genus was named for Latvian botanist David Hieronymus Grindel, 1776–1836.

They are herbaceous plants or subshrubs with annual, biennial, or perennial life cycles. The flowerheads are composed of numerous yellow disc florets (usually between 100–200) and from zero to sixty or more yellow or orange ray florets. Grindelia squarrosa, a plant with bright yellow flowers indigenous to much of the United States, is commonly called curlycup gumweed. Grindelia robusta, found in the western states, is a coastal scrub bush that is reputed to have several medicinal uses. Hairy gumweed, Grindelia cuneifolia, occurs in brackish coastal marshes of western North America, such as in some portions of the San Francisco Bay perimeter. The genus is native to South America, Mexico, and western North America, though some species have been introduced and naturalized in eastern North America and the Old World.

Grindelia species are used as food plants by the larvae of some Lepidoptera species including Schinia mortua.

== Species ==
There are many species, including:

- Grindelia adenodonta - Texas
- Grindelia aegialitis - Buenos Aires
- Grindelia aggregata - British Columbia
- Grindelia andina - Chile
- Grindelia anethifolia - Chile, Argentina
- Grindelia arizonica - USA (Arizona New Mexico Utah Colorado), Coahuila, Chihuahua, western Texas
- Grindelia boliviana - Bolivia, Peru, Argentina
- Grindelia brachystephana - Peru, Argentina
- Grindelia buphthalmoides - Uruguay, Rio Grande do Sul, Buenos Aires
- Grindelia cabrerae - northern Argentina
- Grindelia chacoensis - northern Argentina, Paraguay
- Grindelia chiloensis - Chile, Argentina
- Grindelia ciliata - western + central USA
- Grindelia confusa - Chihuahua
- Grindelia coronensis - southern Argentina
- Grindelia covasii - northern Argentina
- Grindelia decumbens - Colorado, New Mexico
- Grindelia eligulata - Nuevo León, Coahuila, Chihuahua
- Grindelia fraxinipratensis - California, Nevada
- Grindelia globularifolia - northern Argentina
- Grindelia glutinosa - Tarapacá, Peru
- Grindelia grandiflora - Coahuila, Texas
- Grindelia greenmanii - Nuevo León, Coahuila, San Luis Potosí
- Grindelia havardii - Texas, New Mexico
- Grindelia hintoniorum - Nuevo León
- Grindelia hirsutula - California
- Grindelia howellii - Idaho
- Grindelia integrifolia - Oregon Washington British Columbia
- Grindelia inuloides - from Coahuila to Oaxaca
- Grindelia lanceolata - USA (mostly southern Plains), Nuevo León
- Grindelia linearifolia - Uruguay
- Grindelia macvaughii - Jalisco
- Grindelia mendocina - northern Argentina
- Grindelia microcephala - Texas
- Grindelia mutabilis - Brazil
- Grindelia nelsonii - Jalisco, Colima, Michoacán
- Grindelia nuda - Colorado, New Mexico, Texas, Oklahoma
- Grindelia oaxacana - Oaxaca
- Grindelia obovatifolia - Nuevo León
- Grindelia oolepis - Texas
- Grindelia orientalis - Uruguay
- Grindelia oxylepis - New Mexico, Chihuahua, Coahuila, Durango, San Luis Potosí, Colima
- Grindelia palmeri - San Luis Potosí
- Grindelia patagonica - Argentina
- Grindelia prostrata - northern Argentina
- Grindelia prunelloides - Chile, southern Argentina
- Grindelia puberula - Rio Grande do Sul, Argentina, Paraguay
- Grindelia pusilla - Texas, Coahuila
- Grindelia pygmaea - southern Argentina
- Grindelia ragonesei - northern Argentina
- Grindelia robinsonii - San Luis Potosí, Hidalgo
- Grindelia robusta - California, Baja California, Baja California Sur
- Grindelia rupestris - Rio Grande do Sul, Uruguay
- Grindelia scabra - Texas, New Mexico, Coahuila
- Grindelia scorzonerifolia - Argentina, Paraguay, Brazil, Uruguay
- Grindelia squarrosa - much of USA + Canada
- Grindelia stricta - west coast of North America (California to Alaska)
- Grindelia subalpina - Colorado, New Mexico, Wyoming
- Grindelia subdecurrens - San Luis Potosí, Zacatecas, Aguascalientes
- Grindelia sublanuginosa - Jalisco
- Grindelia tarapacana - Tarapacá, Peru
- Grindelia tehuelches - Argentina
- Grindelia tenella - Nuevo León, San Luis Potosí, Tamaulipas
- Grindelia turneri - Nuevo León
- Grindelia ventanensis Buenos Aires
- Grindelia vetimontis - Nuevo León
- Grindelia villarrealii - Nuevo León
