= Rare, endangered and threatened plants of Kerala =

The Database on Rare, Endangered and Threatened plants of Kerala is a red list compiled by The Kerala Forest Research Institute (KFRI), Peechi, Kerala, with information from various institutions and scientists. It is a list of plants that are presently threatened present in Kerala.

Serial Number	Name of the Species	Common name	Family	Conservation status
1	Acampe congesta (Lindl.) Lindl.		Orchidaceae	
2	Acranthera grandiflora Bedd.		Rubiaceae	
3	Actinodaphne campanulata Hook. f. var. campanulata		Lauraceae	
4	Actinodaphne campanulata Hook. f. var. obtusa Gamble		Lauraceae	
5	Actinodaphne lawsonii Gamble		Lauraceae	VU
6	Actinodaphne malabarica Balakr.		Lauraceae	
7	Actinodaphne salicina Meisner in DC.		Lauraceae	EN
8	Aglaia apiocarpa (Thw.) Hiern in Hook. f.		Meliaceae	VU
9	Aglaia barberi Gamble		Meliaceae	
10	Aglaia bourdillonii Gamble		Meliaceae	VU
11	Aglaia edulis (Roxb.) Wall.		Meliaceae	NT
12	Aglaia lawii (Wight) Sald. in Sald. & Nicols.		Meliaceae	LC
13	Aglaia malabarica Sasidh.		Meliaceae	cr
14	Aglaia perviridis Hiern in Hook. f.		Meliaceae	vu
15	Aglaia simplicifolia (Bedd.) Harms		Meliaceae	NT
16	Albizia lathamii Hole		Mimosaceae	
17	Allophylus concanicus Radlk.		Sapindaceae	
18	Amomum pterocarpum Thw.		Zingiberaceae	
19	Amorphophallus hohenackeri (Schott) Engl. & Gehrm.		Araceae	
20	Ampelocissus indica (L.) Planch.		Vitaceae	
21	Anacolosa densiflora Bedd.		Olacaceae	EN
22	Anaphalis barnesii Fischer		Asteraceae	
23	Anaphalis beddomei Hook. f.		Asteraceae	
24	Anaphalis neelgerryana (Sch.-Bip. exDC.) DC.		Asteraceae	
25	Anaphalis notoniana (DC.) DC.		Asteraceae	
26	Anaphalis travancorica W. W. Smith		Asteraceae	
27	Anaphyllum beddomei Engl.		Araceae	
28	Anaphyllum wightii Schott.		Araceae	
29	Andrographis explicata (Clarke) Gamble		Acanthaceae	
30	Aneilema ovalifolia (Wight) Hook. f. ex Clarke in A. & C. DC.		Commelinaceae	
31	Anisochilus argenteus Gamble		Lamiaceae	
32	Anisochilus wightii Hook. f.		Lamiaceae	
33	Antistrophe serratifolia (Bedd.) Hook. f. in Benth. & Hook. f.		Primulaceae	
34	Aporosa bourdillonii Stapf		Euphorbiaceae	EN
35	Aralia malabarica Bedd.		Araliaceae	VU
36	Ardisia amplexicaulis Bedd.		Primulaceae	EN
37	Ardisia blatteri Gamble		Primulaceae	EN
38	Ardisia sonchifolia Mez. in Engl.		Primulaceae	EN
39	Arenga wightii Griff.		Arecaceae	VU
40	Arisaema attenuatum Barnes & Fischer		Araceae	
41	Arisaema barnesii Fischer		Araceae	
42	Arisaema murrayi (Graham) Hook.		Araceae	
43	Arisaema psittacus Barnes in Hook		Araceae	
44	Arisaema sarracenioides Barnes & Fischer in Hook.		Araceae	
45	Arisaema translucens Fischer		Araceae	
46	Arisaema tuberculatum Fischer		Araceae	
47	Arisaema tylophorum Fischer		Araceae	
48	Aspidopterys canarensis Dalz.		Malpighiaceae	
49	Atuna indica (Bedd.) Kosterm.		Chrysobalanaceae	EN
50	Atuna travancorica (Bedd.) Kosterm.		Chrysobalanaceae	EN
51	Begonia albo-coccinea Hook.		Begoniaceae	
52	Begonia aliciae Fischer		Begoniaceae	
53	Begonia canarana Miq.		Begoniaceae	
54	Begonia cordifolia (Wight) Thw.		Begoniaceae	
55	Begonia subpeltata Wight		Begoniaceae	
56	Begonia trichocarpa Dalz.		Begoniaceae	
57	Beilschmiedia wightii (Nees) Benth. ex Hook. f.		Lauraceae	
58	Belosynapsis kewensis Hassk.		Commelinaceae	
59	Belosynapsis vivipara (Dalz.) Fischer		Commelinaceae	
60	Bentinckia condapanna Berry & Roxb.		Arecaceae	VU
61	Bhidea burnsiana Bor		Poaceae	
62	Biophytum insigne Gamble		Oxalidaceae	
63	Biophytum longipedunculatum Govind.		Oxalidaceae	
64	Blachia reflexa Benth.		Euphorbiaceae	
65	Blepharistemma serratum (Dennst.) Suresh in Nicols. et al.		Rhizophoraceae	
66	Boesenbergia pulcherrima (Wall.) O. Ktze.		Zingiberaceae	
67	Buchanania barberi Gamble		Anacardiaceae	CR
68	Buchanania lanceolata Wight		Anacardiaceae	VU
69	Bulbophyllum albidum (Wight) Hook. f.		Orchidaceae	
70	Bulbophyllum aureum (Hook. f.) J. J. Smith		Orchidaceae	
71	Bulbophyllum elegantulum (Rolfe) J. J. Smith		Orchidaceae	
72	Bulbophyllum fuscopurpureum Wight		Orchidaceae	
73	Bulbophyllum mysorense (Rolfe) J. J. Smith		Orchidaceae	
74	Bunium nothum (Clarke) Mukherjee		Apiaceae	
75	Byrsophyllum tetrandrum (Bedd.) Hook. f. ex Bedd.		Rubiaceae	
76	Calamus brandisii Becc. ex Becc. & Hook. f. in Hook. f.		Arecaceae	
77	Calamus huegelianus Mart.		Arecaceae	
78	Calamus nagbettai Fernandez Dey		Arecaceae	
79	Campanula alphonsii Wall. ex A. DC.		Companulaceae	
80	Canthium neilgherrense Wight		Rubiaceae	
81	Capparis diversifolia Wight & Arn.		Capparaceae	
82	Capparis fusifera Dunn		Capparaceae	
83	Capparis rheedei DC.		Capparaceae	
84	Capparis shevaroyensis Sundara Raghavan		Capparaceae	
85	Caralluma procumbens Grav. & Mayur.		Asclepiadaceae	
86	Carex wightiana Nees in Wight		Cyperaceae	
87	Casearia rubescens Dalz. var. gamblei Mukherjee		Flacourtiaceae	
88	Casearia wynadensis Bedd.		Flacourtiaceae	VU
89	Cayratia pedata (Lam.) A. Juss. ex Gagnep. var. glabra Gamble		Vitaceae	
90	Ceropegia beddomei Hook. f.		Asclepiadaceae	
91	Ceropegia decaisneana Wight		Asclepiadaceae	
92	Ceropegia fimbriifera Bedd.		Asclepiadaceae	
93	Ceropegia maculata Bedd.		Asclepiadaceae	
94	Ceropegia metziana Miq.		Asclepiadaceae	
95	Ceropegia omissa H. Huber		Asclepiadaceae	
96	Ceropegia pusilla Wight & Arn. in Wight		Asclepiadaceae	
97	Ceropegia spiralis Wight		Asclepiadaceae	
98	Ceropegia thwaitesii Hook.		Asclepiadaceae	
99	Ceropegia vincifolia Hook.		Asclepiadaceae	
100	Chionanthus linocieroides (Wight) Bennet & Raizada		Oleaceae	
101	Chloroxylon swietenia DC.		Flindersiaceae	VU
102	Chrysopogon tadulingamii Sreekumar et al.		Poaceae	
103	Chrysopogon velutinus (Hook. f.) Bor		Poaceae	
104	Cinnamomum chemungianum Mohanan & Henry		Lauraceae	
105	Cinnamomum filipedicellatum Kosterm.		Lauraceae	
106	Cinnamomum perrottetii Meisner in DC.		Lauraceae	
107	Cinnamomum riparium Gamble		Lauraceae	
108	Cinnamomum travancoricum Gamble		Lauraceae	
109	Cirrhopetalum neilgherrense Wight		Orchidaceae	
110	Claoxylon anomalum Hook. f.		Euphorbiaceae	
111	Cleistanthus travancorensis Jablonszky		Euphorbiaceae	
112	Clematis bourdillonii Dunn		Ranunculaceae	
113	Coelogyne mossiae Rolfe		Orchidaceae	
114	Colubrina travancorica Bedd.		Rhamnaceae	
115	Commelina indehiscens Barnes		Commelinaceae	
116	Commelina wightii Rao		Commelinaceae	
117	Corymborkis veratrifolia (Reinw.) Blume		Orchidaceae	
118	Crotalaria barbata Graham ex Wight & Arn.		Fabaceae	
119	Crotalaria bidiei Gamble		Fabaceae	
120	Crotalaria clarkei Gamble		Fabaceae	
121	Crotalaria fysonii Dunn var. glabra Gamble		Fabaceae	
122	Crotalaria grahamiana Wight & Arn.		Fabaceae	
123	Crotalaria longipes Wight & Arn.		Fabaceae	
124	Crotalaria scabra Gamble		Fabaceae	
125	Crotalaria willdenowiana DC.		Fabaceae	
126	Cryptocarya anamalayana Gamble		Lauraceae	EN
127	Cryptocarya beddomei Gamble		Lauraceae	
128	Cryptocoryne consobrina Schott		Araceae	
129	Curcuma decipiens Dalz.		Zingiberaceae	
130	Cyanotis burmanniana Wight		Commelinaceae	
131	Cyathocline lutea Lawson ex Wight		Asteraceae	
132	Cyclea fissicalyx Dunn in Gamble		Menispermaceae	
133	Cynanchum alatum Wight & Arn. in Wight		Asclepiadaceae	
134	Cynometra beddomei Prain		Caesalpiniaceae	EN
135	Cynometra travancorica Bedd.		Caesalpiniaceae	EN
136	Dalbergia beddomei Thoth.		Fabaceae	
137	Dalbergia congesta Graham ex Wight & Arn.		Fabaceae	
138	Dalbergia horrida (Dennst.) Mabb. var. glabrescens (Prain) Thoth. & Nair		Fabaceae	
139	Dalbergia latifolia Roxb.		Fabaceae	VU
140	Dalbergia malabarica Prain		Fabaceae	
141	Dalbergia travancorica Thoth.		Fabaceae	
142	Dendrobium jerdonianum Wight		Orchidaceae	
143	Dendrobium microbulbon A. Rich.		Orchidaceae	
144	Derris benthamii (Thw.) Thw.		Fabaceae	
145	Derris brevipes (Benth.) Baker var. travancorica Thoth.		Fabaceae	
146	Derris thothathrii Bennet		Fabaceae	
147	Desmodium ferrugineum Wall. ex Thw. ssp. Wynaadense (Bedd ex Gamble) Ohashi		Fabaceae	
148	Desmos viridiflorus (Bedd.) Safford		Annonaceae	
149	Dialium travancoricum Bourd.		Caesalpiniaceae	VU
150	Didymocarpus fischeri Gamble		Gesneriaceae	
151	Didymocarpus ovalifolia Wight		Gesneriaceae	
152	Didymocarpus repens Bedd.		Gesneriaceae	
153	Dimeria borii Sreekumar et al.		Poaceae	
154	Dimeria kanjirapallilana Jacob		Poaceae	
155	Dimeria kurumthotticalana Jacob		Poaceae	
156	Dioscorea wightii Hook. f.		Dioscoreaceae	
157	Diospyros barberi Ramas.		Ebenaceae	
158	Diospyros sulcata Bourd.		Ebenaceae	
159	Diospyros trichophylla Alston in Trimen		Ebenaceae	
160	Dipterocarpus bourdillonii Brandis in Hook.		Dipterocarpaceae	CR
161	Dimorphocalyx beddomei (Benth.) Airy Shaw		Euphorbiaceae	
162	Drypetes confertiflora (Hook. f.) Pax & Hoffm.		Euphorbiaceae	
163	Drypetes gardneri (Thw.) Pax & Hoffmann		Euphorbiaceae	
164	Drypetes malabarica (Bedd.) Airy Shaw		Euphorbiaceae	
165	Drypetes wightii (Hook. f. ) Pax & Hoffm.		Euphorbiaceae	VU
166	Dysoxylum beddomei Hiern in Hook. f.		Meliaceae	
167	Ehretia wightiana Wall. ex G. Don		Boraginaceae	
168	Elaeocarpus munroi (Wight) Mast. in Hook. f.		Elaeocarpaceae	NT
169	Elaeocarpus recurvatus Corner		Elaeocarpaceae	VU
170	Elaeocarpus venustus Bedd.		Elaeocarpaceae	VU
171	Embelia gardneriana Wight		Primulaceae	
172	Epithema carnosum (G. Don) Benth. var. hispida Clarke in A. & C. DC.		Gesneriaceae	
173	Eria albiflora Rolfe		Orchidaceae	
174	Eriocaulon cuspidatum Dalz.		Eriocaulaceae	
175	Eriolaena lushingtonii Dunn		Sterculiaceae	VU
176	Eugenia argentea Bedd.		Myrtaceae	
177	Syzygium calcadense (Bedd.) Chandrash.		Myrtaceae	VU
178	Eugenia discifera Gamble		Myrtaceae	EN
179	Eugenia indica (Wight) Chithra in Nair & Henry		Myrtaceae	EN
180	Eugenia rottleriana Wight & Arn.		Myrtaceae	VU
181	Eugenia singampattiana Bedd.		Myrtaceae	EN
182	Eulophia cullenii (Wight) Blume		Orchidaceae	
183	Euonymus angulatus Wight		Celastraceae	VU
184	Euonymus laxiflorus Champ. ex Benth.		Celastraceae	LC
185	Euonymus serratifolius Bedd.		Celastraceae	EN
186	Euphorbia santapaui Henry		Euphorbiaceae	
187	Euphorbia vajravelui Binoj. & Balakr.		Euphorbiaceae	VU
188	Exacum anamallayanum Bedd.		Gentianaceae	
189	Exacum courtallense Arn.		Gentianaceae	
190	Exacum travancoricum Bedd.		Gentianaceae	
191	Fimbristylis arnottiana Boeck.		Cyperaceae	
192	Garcinia imberti Bourd.		Clusiaceae	CR
193	Garcinia rubroechinata Kosterm.		Clusiaceae	EN
194	Garcinia travancorica Bedd.		Clusiaceae	CR
195	Garcinia wightii Anders. in Hook. f.		Clusiaceae	EN
196	Garnotia puchiparensis Bor		Poaceae	
197	Garnotia schmidii Hook. f.		Poaceae	
198	Glochidion bourdillonii Gamble		Euphorbiaceae	VU
199	Glochidion hohenackeri (Muell.-Arg) Bedd. var. johnstonei (Hook. f.) Chakrab. & Gangop.		Euphorbiaceae	
200	Glochidion zeylanicum (Gaertn.) A. Juss. var. tomentosum (Dalz.) Chakrab. & Gangop.		Euphorbiaceae	
201	Gluta travancorica Bedd.		Anacardiaceae	NT
202	Glycosmis macrocarpa Wight		Rutaceae	
203	Glyphochloa divergens (Hack.) W.D. Clayton		Poaceae	
204	Glyptopetalum lawsonii Gamble		Celastraceae	VU
205	Gnaphalium coarctatum Willd.		Asteraceae	
206	Goniothalamus rhynchantherus Dunn		Annonaceae	EN
207	Goniothalamus wynaadensis (Bedd.) Bedd.		Annonaceae	NT
208	Grewia gamblei Drumm. ex Dunn in Gamble		Tiliaceae	
209	Grewia heterotricha Mast. in Hook. f.		Tiliaceae	
210	Grewia pandaica Drumm. ex Dunn in Gamble		Tiliaceae	
211	Gymnema khandalense Sant.		Asclepiadaceae	
212	Habenaria barnesii Summerh. ex Fischer in Gamble		Orchidaceae	
213	Habenaria richardiana Wight		Orchidaceae	
214	Haplothismia exannulata Airy Shaw		Burmanniaceae	
215	Hedyotis albo-nervia Bedd.		Rubiaceae	
216	Hedyotis articularis R. Br. exWight & Arn. ssp. santapaui (Shetty & Vivek.) Deb & Dutta		Rubiaceae	
217	Hedyotis beddomei Hook. f.		Rubiaceae	
218	Hedyotis bourdillonii (Gamble) Rao & Hemadri		Rubiaceae	
219	Hedyotis buxifolia Bedd.		Rubiaceae	
220	Hedyotis eualata (Gamble) Henry & Subram., var. agastyamalayana Henry & Subram.		Rubiaceae	
221	Hedyotis eualata (Gamble) Henry & Subram., var. eualata		Rubiaceae	
222	Hedyotis hirsutissima Bedd.		Rubiaceae	
223	Hedyotis pruinosa Wight & Arn.		Rubiaceae	
224	Hedyotis ramarowii (Gamble) Rao & Hemadri		Rubiaceae	
225	Hedyotis swertioides Hook. f.		Rubiaceae	
226	Hedyotis travancorica Bedd.		Rubiaceae	
227	Hedyotis wynaadensis (Gamble) Rao & Hemadri		Rubiaceae	
228	Heterostemma beddomei (Hook. f.) Swarup. & Mangaly		Asclepiadaceae	
229	Holigarna beddomei Hook. f.		Anacardiaceae	
230	Holigarna grahamii (Wight) Kurz		Anacardiaceae	
231	Homalium jainii Henry & Swamin.		Flacourtiaceae	
232	Homalium travancoricum Bedd.		Flacourtiaceae	
233	Hopea erosa (Bedd.) van Sloot.		Dipterocarpaceae	
234	Hopea glabra Wight & Arn.		Dipterocarpaceae	
235	Hopea jacobi Fischer		Dipterocarpaceae	
236	Hopea ponga (Dennst.) Mabb.		Dipterocarpaceae	
237	Hopea racophloea Dyer in Hook. f.		Dipterocarpaceae	
238	Hopea utilis (Bedd.) Bole		Dipterocarpaceae	
239	Humboldtia bourdillonii Prain		Caesalpiniaceae	
240	Humboldtia decurrens Bedd. ex Oliver in Hook.		Caesalpiniaceae	
241	Humboldtia laurifolia Vahl		Caesalpiniaceae	
242	Humboldtia unijuga Bedd. var. trijuga (Joseph & Chandras.)		Caesalpiniaceae	
243	Humboldtia unijuga Bedd. var. unijuga		Caesalpiniaceae	
244	Hybanthus travancoricus (Bedd.) Melch. in Engl. & Prantl		Violaceae	
245	Hydnocarpus macrocarpa (Bedd.) Warb.		Flacourtiaceae	
246	Hydrocotyle conferta Wight		Apiaceae	
247	Ilex gardneriana Wight		Aquifoliaceae	
248	Impatiens acaulis Arn.		Balsaminaceae	
249	Impatiens anaimudica Fischer		Balsaminaceae	
250	Impatiens auriculata Wight		Balsaminaceae	
251	Impatiens cochinica Hook. f.		Balsaminaceae	
252	Impatiens coelotropis Fischer		Balsaminaceae	
253	Impatiens concinna Hook. f.		Balsaminaceae	
254	Impatiens crenata Bedd.		Balsaminaceae	
255	Impatiens dasysperma Wight		Balsaminaceae	
256	Impatiens denisonii Bedd.		Balsaminaceae	
257	Impatiens elegans Bedd.		Balsaminaceae	
258	Impatiens floribunda Wight		Balsaminaceae	
259	Impatiens herbicola Hook. f.		Balsaminaceae	
260	Impatiens johnii Barnes		Balsaminaceae	
261	Impatiens laticornis Fischer		Balsaminaceae	
262	Impatiens lucida Heyne ex Hook.f.		Balsaminaceae	
263	Impatiens macrocarpa Hook. f.		Balsaminaceae	
264	Impatiens orchioides Bedd.		Balsaminaceae	
265	Impatiens pallidiflora Hook.f.		Balsaminaceae	
266	Impatiens pandata Barnes.		Balsaminaceae	
267	Impatiens phoenicea Bedd.		Balsaminaceae	
268	Impatiens platyadena Fischer		Balsaminaceae	
269	Impatiens rufescens Benth. ex Wight & Arn.		Balsaminaceae	
270	Impatiens rupicola Hook. f.		Balsaminaceae	
271	Impatiens tenella Heyne ex Hook. f.		Balsaminaceae	
272	Impatiens travancorica Bedd.		Balsaminaceae	
273	Impatiens umbellata Heyne ex Roxb.		Balsaminaceae	
274	Impatiens viridiflora Wight		Balsaminaceae	
275	Impatiens viscida Wight		Balsaminaceae	
276	Impatiens viscosa Bedd.		Balsaminaceae	
277	Impatiens wightiana Bedd.		Balsaminaceae	
278	Indigofera barberi Gamble		Fabaceae	
279	Indigofera constricta (Thw.) Trimen		Fabaceae	
280	Inga cynometroides (Bedd.) Bedd. ex Barker in Hook. f.		Mimosaceae	
281	Ipsea malabarica (Reichb.f.) Hook. f.		Orchidaceae	
282	Isachne fischeri Bor		Poaceae	
283	Isachne setosa Fischer		Poaceae	
284	Ischaemum agastyamalayanum Sreekumar et al.		Poaceae	
285	Ischaemum copeanum Sreekumar et al.		Poaceae	
286	Isonandra stocksii Clarke in Hook. f.		Sapotaceae	
287	Ixora johnsonii Hook. f.		Rubiaceae	
288	Ixora lawsonii Gamble		Rubiaceae	
289	Ixora malabarica (Dennst.) Mabb.		Rubiaceae	
290	Ixora monticola Gamble		Rubiaceae	
291	Julostylis polyandra Ravi & Anil Kumar		Malvaceae	
292	Kalanchoe olivacea Dalz. & Gibs.		Chrysobalanaceae	
293	Kingiodendron pinnatum (Roxb. exDC.)		Caesalpiniaceae	
294	Knoxia sumatrensis (Retz.) DC. var. linearis (Gamble) Bhattacharjee & Deb		Rubiaceae	
295	Kunstleria keralensis Mohanan & Nair		Fabaceae	
296	Lasianthus blumeanus Wight		Rubiaceae	
297	Lasianthus capitulatus Wight		Rubiaceae	
298	Lasianthus ciliatus Wight		Rubiaceae	
299	Lasianthus cinereus Gamble		Rubiaceae	
300	Lasianthus dichotomous Wight		Rubiaceae	
301	Lasianthus jackianus Wight		Rubiaceae	
302	Lasianthus oblongifolius Bedd.		Rubiaceae	
303	Lasianthus obovatus Bedd.		Rubiaceae	
304	Lasianthus rostratus Wight		Rubiaceae	
305	Lasianthus strigillosus Hook. f.		Rubiaceae	
306	Lasianthus truncatus Bedd.		Rubiaceae	
307	Leucas pubescens Benth.		Lamiaceae	
308	Limnopoa meeboldii (Fischer) C. E. Hubb. in Hook.		Poaceae	
309	Litsea beddomei Hook. f.		Lauraceae	
310	Litsea mysorensis Gamble		Lauraceae	
311	Litsea nigrescens Gamble		Lauraceae	
312	Litsea travancorica Gamble		Lauraceae	
313	Luffa umbellata (Klein ) Roem.		Cucurbitaceae	
314	Madhuca bourdillonii (Gamble) H. J. Lam		Sapotaceae	
315	Maesa velutina Mez		Primulaceae	
316	Mallotus atrovirens Muell.-Arg.		Euphorbiaceae	
317	Marsdenia raziana Yoga. & Subram.		Asclepiadaceae	
318	Marsdenia tirunelvelica Henry & Subram.		Asclepiadaceae	
319	Medinilla malabarica (Bedd.) Bedd.		Melastomataceae	
320	Melicope indica Wight		Rutaceae	
321	Memecylon flavescens Gamble		Melastomataceae	
322	Memecylon gracile Bedd.		Melastomataceae	
323	Memecylon lawsonii Gamble		Melastomataceae	
324	Memecylon sisparense Gamble		Melastomataceae	
325	Memecylon subramanii Henry		Melastomataceae	
326	Mesua ferrea L. var. coromandeliana (Wight) Singh		Clusiaceae	
327	Meteoromyrtus wynaadensis (Bedd.) Gamble		Myrtaceae	
328	Miliusa nilagirica Bedd.		Annonaceae	
329	Miquelia dentata Bedd.		Icacinaceae	
330	Mitrephora grandiflora Bedd.		Annonaceae	
331	Morinda reticulata Gamble		Rubiaceae	
332	Murdannia crocea (Griff.) Faden ssp. ochracea (Dalz.) Faden		Commelinaceae	
333	Murdannia lanceolata (Wight) Kammathy		Commelinaceae	
334	Murdannia lanuginosa (Wall. ex Clarke) Brueck.		Commelinaceae	
335	Mycetia acuminata (Wight) O. Kitze.		Rubiaceae	
336	Myriactis wightii DC. in Wight var. bellidioides Hook. f.		Asteraceae	
337	Myristica fatua Houtt. var. magnifica (Bedd.) Sinclair		Myristicaceae	
338	Myristica malabarica Lam.		Myristicaceae	
339	Neanotis rheedei (Wall. exWight & Arn.) Lewis		Rubiaceae	
340	Neolitsea fischeri Gamble		Lauraceae	
341	Nostolachma crassifolia (Gamble) Deb & Lahiri		Rubiaceae	
342	Nothopegia aureo-fulva Bedd. ex Hook. f.		Anacardiaceae	
343	Nothopegia beddomei Gamble var. wynaadica Ellis & Chandra.		Anacardiaceae	
344	Nothopegia heyneana (Hook. f.) Gamble		Anacardiaceae	
345	Oberonia brachyphylla Blatt. & McCann		Orchidaceae	
346	Ochlandra beddomei Gamble		Poaceae	
347	Ochlandra ebracteata Raizada & Chatterjee		Poaceae	
348	Ochlandra setigera Gamble		Poaceae	
349	Ochreinauclea missionis (Wall. ex G. Don) Ridsle		Rubiaceae	
350	Octotropis travancorica Bedd.		Rubiaceae	
351	Ophiorrhiza barberi Gamble		Rubiaceae	
352	Ophiorrhiza burnonis Wight & Arn. var. burnonis		Rubiaceae	
353	Ophiorrhiza caudata Fischer		Rubiaceae	
354	Ophiorrhiza roxburghiana Wight		Rubiaceae	
355	Orophea thomsonii Bedd.		Annonaceae	
356	Orophea uniflora Hook. f. & Thoms.		Annonaceae	
357	Osbeckia aspera (L.) Blume var. travancorica (Bedd. ex Gamble) Hansen		Melastomataceae	
358	Oxytenanthera bourdillonii Gamble		Poaceae	
359	Palaquium bourdillonii Brandis		Sapotaceae	
360	Palaquium ravii Sasidh. & Vink		Sapotaceae	
361	Paphiopedilum druryi (Bedd.) Pfitz.		Orchidaceae	
362	Pavetta calophylla Bremek.		Rubiaceae	
363	Pavetta laeta Bremek.		Rubiaceae	
364	Pavetta nemoralis Bremek.		Rubiaceae	
365	Pavetta oblanceolata Bremek.		Rubiaceae	
366	Pavetta praeterita Bremek.		Rubiaceae	
367	Pavetta travancorica Bremek.		Rubiaceae	
368	Peucedanum anamallayense Clarke in Hook. f.		Apiaceae	
369	Phaeanthus malabaricus Bedd.		Annonaceae	
370	Phyllanthus beddomei (Gamble) Mohanan		Euphorbiaceae	
371	Phyllanthus chandrabosei Govaerts & Radcl.-Sm.		Euphorbiaceae	
372	Phyllanthus gageanus (Gamble) Mohanan		Euphorbiaceae	
373	Phyllanthus megacarpa (Gamble) Kumari & Chadrab. in Henry et al.		Euphorbiaceae	
374	Phyllanthus narayanaswamii Gamble		Euphorbiaceae	
375	Phyllocephalum sengaltherianum (Narayana) Narayana		Asteraceae	
376	Pimpinella pulneyensis Gamble		Apiaceae	
377	Piper barberi Gamble		Piperaceae	
378	Piper hapnium Buch.-Ham. ex Hook. f.		Piperaceae	
379	Pittosporum dasycaulon Miq.		Pittosporaceae	
380	Poeciloneuron pauciflorum Bedd.		Bonnetiaceae	
381	Pogostemon atropurpureus Benth. in DC.		Lamiaceae	
382	Pogostemon gardneri Hook. f.		Lamiaceae	
383	Pogostemon travancoricus Bedd. var. travancoricus		Lamiaceae	
384	Pogostemon vestitus Benth. in Wall.		Lamiaceae	
385	Polyalthia rufescens Hook. f. & Thoms. in Hook. f.		Annonaceae	
386	Polyalthia shendurunii Basha & Sasidh.		Annonaceae	
387	Polypleurum filifolium (Ramam. & Joseph) Nagendran et al.		Podostemaceae	
388	Polyzygus tuberosus Dalz.		Apiaceae	
389	Popowia beddomeana Hook. f. & Thoms. In Hook. f.		Annonaceae	
390	Pothos armatus Fischer		Araceae	
391	Pothos thomsonianus Schott		Araceae	
392	Premna glaberrima Wight		Verbenaceae	
393	Premna paucinervis (Clarke) Gamble		Verbenaceae	
394	Premna villosa Clarke in Hook. f.		Verbenaceae	
395	Protasparagus fysonii (Macbr.) Kamble		Liliaceae	
396	Psychotria barberi Gamble		Rubiaceae	
397	Psychotria beddomei Deb & Gangop.		Rubiaceae	
398	Psychotria globicephala Gamble		Rubiaceae	
399	Psychotria johnsonii Hook. f.		Rubiaceae	
400	Psychotria macrocarpa Hook. f.		Rubiaceae	
401	Psydrax ficiformis (Hook. f.) Bridson		Rubiaceae	
402	Psydrax pergracile (Bourd.) Ridsid.		Rubiaceae	
403	Pterospermum reticulatum Wight & Arn.		Sterculiaceae	
404	Rapanea thwaitesii Mez		Primulaceae	
405	Rauvolfia hookeri Sreenivas. & Chithra in Henry et al.		Apocynaceae	
406	Rauvolfia micrantha Hook. f.		Apocynaceae	
407	Rhododendron arboreum J. E. Smith ssp. nilagiricum (Zenk.) Tagg.		Ericaceae	
408	Rotala ritchiei (Clarke) Koehne		Lythraceae	
409	Sageraea grandiflora Dunn		Annonaceae	
410	Sageraea laurifolia (Graham) Blatt.		Annonaceae	
411	Salacia beddomei Gamble		Hippocrateaceae	
412	Salacia macrosperma Wight		Hippocrateaceae	
413	Salacia malabarica Gamble		Hippocrateaceae	
414	Santalum album L.		Santalaceae	
415	Saprosma corymbosum (Bedd.) Bedd.		Rubiaceae	
416	Saprosma fragrans Bedd.		Rubiaceae	
417	Saraca asoca (Roxb.) de Wilde		Caesalpiniaceae	
418	Heptapleurum bourdillonii (Gamble) Lowry & G.M.Plunkett		Araliaceae	
419	Semecarpus auriculata Bedd.		Anacardiaceae	
420	Semecarpus travancorica Bedd.		Anacardiaceae	
421	Senecio multiceps Balakr.		Asteraceae	
422	Smilax wightii A. DC. in A. & C. DC.		Smilacaceae	
423	Smithia venkobarowii Gamble		Fabaceae	
424	Solenocarpus indicus Wight & Arn.		Anacardiaceae	
425	Sonerila devicolamensis Nayar		Melastomataceae	
426	Sonerila elegans Wight var. beddomei Giri & Nayar		Melastomataceae	
427	Sonerila grandiflora R. Br. ex Wight & Arn.		Melastomataceae	
428	Sonerila nemakadensis Fischer		Melastomataceae	
429	Sonerila pulneyensis Gamble		Melastomataceae	
430	Sonerila sahyadrica Giri & Nayar		Melastomataceae	
431	Sonerila speciosa Zenk.		Melastomataceae	
432	Sonerila versicolor Wight var. axillaris (Wight) Gamble		Melastomataceae	
433	Sophora wightii Baker in Hook. f.		Fabaceae	
434	Strobilanthes dupenii Bedd. ex Clarke in Hook. f.		Acanthaceae	
435	Swertia beddomei Clarke in Hook. f.		Gentianaceae	
436	Symplocos anamallayana Bedd.		Symplocaceae	
437	Symplocos macrocarpa Wight ex Clarke ssp. Kanarana (Talbot) Nooteb.		Symplocaceae	
438	Symplocos macrocarpa Wight exClarke in Hook. f. ssp. macrocarpa		Symplocaceae	
439	Symplocos monantha Wight		Symplocaceae	
440	Symplocos nairii Henry et al.		Symplocaceae	
441	Symplocos oligandra Bedd.		Symplocaceae	
442	Syzygium benthamianum (Wight ex Duthie) Gamble		Myrtaceae	
443	Syzygium bourdillonii (Gamble) Rathkr. & Nair		Myrtaceae	
444	Syzygium chavaran (Bourd.) Gamble		Myrtaceae	
445	Syzygium courtallensis (Gamble) Alston in Trimen		Myrtaceae	
446	Syzygium densiflorum Wall. ex Wight & Arn.		Myrtaceae	
447	Syzygium gambleanum Rathakr. & Chithra. in Henry & Nair		Myrtaceae	
448	Syzygium myhendrae (Bedd. ex Brandis) Gamble		Myrtaceae	
449	Syzygium occidentalis (Bourd.) Gandhi in Sald.		Myrtaceae	
450	Syzygium palghatense Gamble		Myrtaceae	
451	Syzygium parameswaranii Mohanan & Henry		Myrtaceae	
452	Syzygium rama-varmae (Bourd.) Chithra in Nair & Henry		Myrtaceae	
453	Syzygium stocksii (Duthie) Gamble		Myrtaceae	
454	Syzygium travancoricum Gamble		Myrtaceae	
455	Tabernaemontana gamblei Subram. & Henry		Apocynaceae	
456	Tabernaemontana heyneana Wall.		Apocynaceae	
457	Taeniophyllum scaberulum Hook. f.		Orchidaceae	
458	Tarenna canarica (Bedd.) Bremek.		Rubiaceae	
459	Tarenna monosperma (Wight & Arn.) Raju		Rubiaceae	
460	Tarenna nilagirica (Bedd.) Bremek.		Rubiaceae	
461	Teinostachyum wightii Bedd.		Poaceae	
462	Tephrosia wynaadensis Drum. in Gamble		Fabaceae	
463	Theriophonum sivaganganum (Ramam. & Sebastine) Bogner		Araceae	
464	Thottea barberi (Gamble) Ding Hou		Aristolochiaceae	
465	Toxocarpus beddomei Gamble		Asclepiadaceae	
466	Toxocarpus palghatensis Gamble		Asclepiadaceae	
467	Tricholepis glaberrima DC. var. angustifolia (DC.) Chaudhary & Pandey		Asteraceae	
468	Trichosanthes anamalaiensis Bedd.		Cucurbitaceae	
469	Typhonium bulbiferum Dalz.		Araceae	
470	Utleria salicifolia Bedd. ex Hook. f.		Periplocaceae	
471	Valeriana hookeriana Wight & Arn.		Valerianaceae	
472	Vanasushava pedata (Wight) Mukherjee & Const.		Apiaceae	
473	Vanilla wightiana Lindl. ex Hook. f.		Orchidaceae	
474	Vateria macrocarpa Gupta		Dipterocarpaceae	
475	Vatica chinensis L.		Dipterocarpaceae	
476	Vepris bilocularis (Wight & Arn.) Engl. in Engl. & Prantl		Rutaceae	
477	Vernonia anaimudica Shetty & Vivek.		Asteraceae	
478	Vernonia anamallica Bedd. ex Gamble		Asteraceae	
479	Vernonia beddomei Hook. f.		Asteraceae	
480	Vernonia bourdillonii Gamble		Asteraceae	
481	Vernonia fisonii Calder		Asteraceae	
482	Vernonia gossypina Gamble		Asteraceae	
483	Vernonia heynei Bedd. ex Gamble		Asteraceae	
484	Vernonia malabarica Hook. f.		Asteraceae	
485	Vernonia multibracteata Gamble		Asteraceae	
486	Vernonia peninsularis (Clarke) Clarke ex Hook.f var. peninsularis		Asteraceae	
487	Vernonia rauii Umiyal		Asteraceae	
488	Vernonia saligna DC. var. nilghirensis Hook.f.		Asteraceae	
489	Vernonia salvifolia Wight		Asteraceae	
490	Willisia selaginoides (Bedd.)Warming exWillis		Podostemaceae	
491	Xylosma latifolia Hook. f. & Thoms. in Hook. f., synonym of Flacourtia latifolia		Salicaceae	
492	Youngia nilgiriensis Babcock		Asteraceae	
493	Zehneria maysorensis Wight & Arn.		Cucurbitaceae	
494	Acorus calamus L.		Araceae	
495	Adenia hondala (Gaertn.) W. J. de Wilde		Passifloraceae	
496	Amorphophallus commutatus (Schott) Engl.		Araceae	
497	Ampelocissus araneosa (Dalz. & Gibson) Lawson		Vitaceae	
498	Aphanamixis polystachya (Wall.) Parker		Meliaceae	
499	Aristolochia tagala Cham.		Aristolochiaceae	
500	Artocarpus hirsutus Lam.		Moraceae	
501	Baliospermum solanifolium (Burm.) Suresh, syn. Baliospermum montanum (Willd.) Mull. Arg.		Euphorbiaceae	
502	Calophyllum apetalum Willd.		Clusiaceae	
503	Canarium strictum Roxb.		Burseraceae	
504	Celastrus paniculatus Willd.		Celastraceae	
505	Chonemorpha fragrans (Moon) Alston		Apocynaceae	
506	Cinnamomum macrocarpum Hook. f.		Lauraceae	
507	Cinnamomum sulphuratum Nees		Lauraceae	
508	Cinnamomum wightii Meisn.		Lauraceae	
509	Coscinium fenestratum (Gaertn.) Coleb.		Menispermaceae	
510	Curcuma pseudomontana Graham		Zingiberaceae	
511	Cycas circinalis L.		Cycadaceae	
512	Decalepis hamiltonii Wight & Arn.		Periplocaceae	
513	Diospyros candolleana Wight		Ebenaceae	
514	Diospyros paniculata Dalz.		Ebenaceae	
515	Dipterocarpus indicus Bedd.		Dipterocarpaceae	
516	Drosera indica L.		Droseraceae	
517	Drosera peltata J. E. Sm. ex Willd.		Droseraceae	
518	Dysoxylum malabaricum Bedd. ex Hiern		Meliaceae	
519	Embelia ribes Burm. f.		Primulaceae	
520	Embelia tsjeriam-cottam (Roem. & Schult.) DC.		Primulaceae	
521	Garcinia gummi-gutta (L.) Robson		Clusiaceae	
522	Garcinia indica (Thouars) Choisy		Clusiaceae	
523	Garcinia morella (Gaertn.) Desr.		Clusiaceae	
524	Gardenia gummifera L.f.		Rubiaceae	
525	Gloriosa superba L.		Colchicaceae	
526	Hedychium coronarium Koenig		Zingiberaceae	
527	Heliotropium keralense Sivar. & Manilal		Boraginaceae	
528	Helminthostachys zeylanica (L.) Hook.		Ophioglossaceae	
529	Heracleum candolleanum (Wight & Arn.) Gamble		Apiaceae	
530	Holostemma ada-kodien Schult.		Asclepiadaceae	
531	Humboldtia vahliana Wight		Caesalpiniaceae	
532	Hydnocarpus alpina Wight		Flacourtiaceae	
533	Hydnocarpus pentandra (Buch. -Ham.) Oken		Flacourtiaceae	
534	Janakia arayalpathra Joseph & Chandrasekharan		Periplocaceae	
535	Knema attenuata (Wall. ex Hook. f. & Thoms.) Warb.		Myristicaceae	
536	Madhuca neriifolia (Moon) H. J. Lam		Sapotaceae	
537	Michelia champaca L.		Magnoliaceae	
538	Michelia nilagirica Zenk.		Magnoliaceae	
539	Myristica dactyloides Gaertn.		Myristicaceae	
540	Nervilia aragoana Gaud.		Orchidaceae	
541	Nilgirianthus ciliatus (Nees) Bremek.		Acanthaceae	
542	Nothapodytes nimmoniana (Graham) Mabb.		Icacinaceae	
543	Operculina turpethum (L.) Silva manso		Convolvulaceae	
544	Oroxylum indicum (L.) Benth. ex Kurz	പലകപയ്യാനി,വെള്ളപ്പാതിരി	Bignoniaceae	
545	Persea macrantha (Nees) Kosterm.		Lauraceae	
546	Piper longum L.		Piperaceae	
547	Piper mullesua Buch.-Ham. ex D. Don		Piperaceae	
548	Piper nigrum L.		Piperaceae	
549	Plectranthus nilgherricus Benth.		Lamiaceae	
550	Pseudarthria viscida (L.) Wight & Arn.		Fabaceae	
551	Pterocarpus santalinus L. f.		Fabaceae	
552	Pueraria tuberosa (Roxb. Ex Willd.) DC.		Fabaceae	
553	Rauvolfia serpentina (L.) Benth. ex Kurz		Apocynaceae	
554	Raphidophora pertusa (Roxb.) Schott		Araceae	
555	Salacia oblonga Wall. ex Wight & Arn.		Hippocrateaceae	
556	Shorea tumbugaia Roxb.		Dipterocarpaceae	EN
557	Smilax zeylanica L.		Smilacaceae	
558	Swertia corymbosa (Griseb.) Wight ex C. B. Clarke		Gentianaceae	
559	Swertia lawii (Wight ex C. B. Clarke) Burkill		Gentianaceae	
560	Symplocos cochinchinensis (Lour.) S. Moore subsp. Laurina (Retz.) Noot.		Symplocaceae	
561	Terminalia arjuna (Roxb. ex DC.) Wight & Arn.		Combretaceae	
562	Tinospora sinensis (Lour.) Merr.		Menispermaceae	
563	Tragia bicolor Miq.		Euphorbiaceae	
564	Trichopus zeylanicus Gaertn. Subsp. travancoricus (Bedd.) Burkill		Trichopodaceae	
565	Valeriana leschenaultii DC.		Valerianaceae	
566	Vateria indica L.		Dipterocarpaceae	
567	Adhatoda beddomei C. B. Clarke		Acanthaceae	
568	Cinnamomum beddomei Gamble		Lauraceae	
569	Cleistanthus malabaricus Muell.-Arg.		Euphorbiaceae	
570	Diospyros humilis Bourd.		Ebenaceae	
571	Dysoxylum ficiforme (Wight) Gamble		Meliaceae	
572	Hopea parviflora Bedd.		Dipterocarpaceae	
573	Ixora agasthyamalayana Sivadasan & Mohanan		Rubiaceae	
574	Salacia lanceolata Wight		Anacardiaceae	
575	Symplocos macrophylla Wall ex A. DC.ssp. rosea (Bedd.) Nooteb.		Symplocaceae	
576	Symplocos pendula Wight		Symplocaceae	
577	Woodfordia fruticosa (L). Kurz.		Lythraceae	
578	Acranthera anamallica Bedd.		Rubiaceae	
579	Psychotria anamalayana Bedd.		Rubiaceae	
580	Sauropus saksenianeus Manilal et al.		Euphorbiaceae	
581	Schizostachyum beddomei Fischer		Poaceae	
582	Litsea quinqueflora (Dennst.) Suresh ( L.lingustrina(Nees) Hook.f.)		Lauraceae	
583	Pseudoxytenanthera bourdillonii (Gamble) Naithani		Poaceae	
584	Psychotria keralensis Deb &Gangop.		Rubiaceae	
585	Shorea roxburghii G.Don		Dipterocarpaceae	
586	Cissampelos pareira Linn.		Menispermaceae	
587	Curcuma Zeodaria Rosc.		Zingiberaceae	
588	Pavetta Wightii Hook.f.		Rubiaceae	
589	Goniothalamus wightii Hook.f.& Thoms.		Annonaceae	

== See also ==
- List of endemic and threatened plants of India
