= Actinodaphne lawsonii =

Conservation status
- Vulnerable (IUCN 3.1)

Scientific classification
- Kingdom: Plantae
- Clade: Embryophytes
- Clade: Tracheophytes
- Clade: Angiosperms
- Clade: Magnoliids
- Order: Laurales
- Family: Lauraceae
- Genus: Actinodaphne
- Species: A. lawsonii

Binomial name
- Actinodaphne lawsonii Gamble

Species of flowering plant

Actinodaphne lawsonii is a species of plant in the family Lauraceae. It is endemic to the Western Ghats of southern India. It is threatened by habitat loss.

== Description ==
Actinodaphne lawsonii is small tree, growing up to 10 m tall.

== Range and habitat ==
Actinodaphne lawsonii is known from about six scattered locations in the Western Ghats, within the Nilgiri Biosphere Reserve in Karnataka, Kerala, and Tamil Nadu states. It has an estimated extent of occurrence (EOO) of 8,173 km^{2} and an estimated area of occupancy (AOO) of 28 km^{2}. The area of occupancy is estimated from collections only, and may be an under-estimate.

It grows in montane evergreen rain forest between 1,500 and 2,100 metres elevation.

== Conservation ==
Much of the species' range is within protected areas. It is threatened by habitat loss and fragmentation from forest clearance for agriculture.

== See also ==
- Rare, endangered and threatened plants of Kerala
