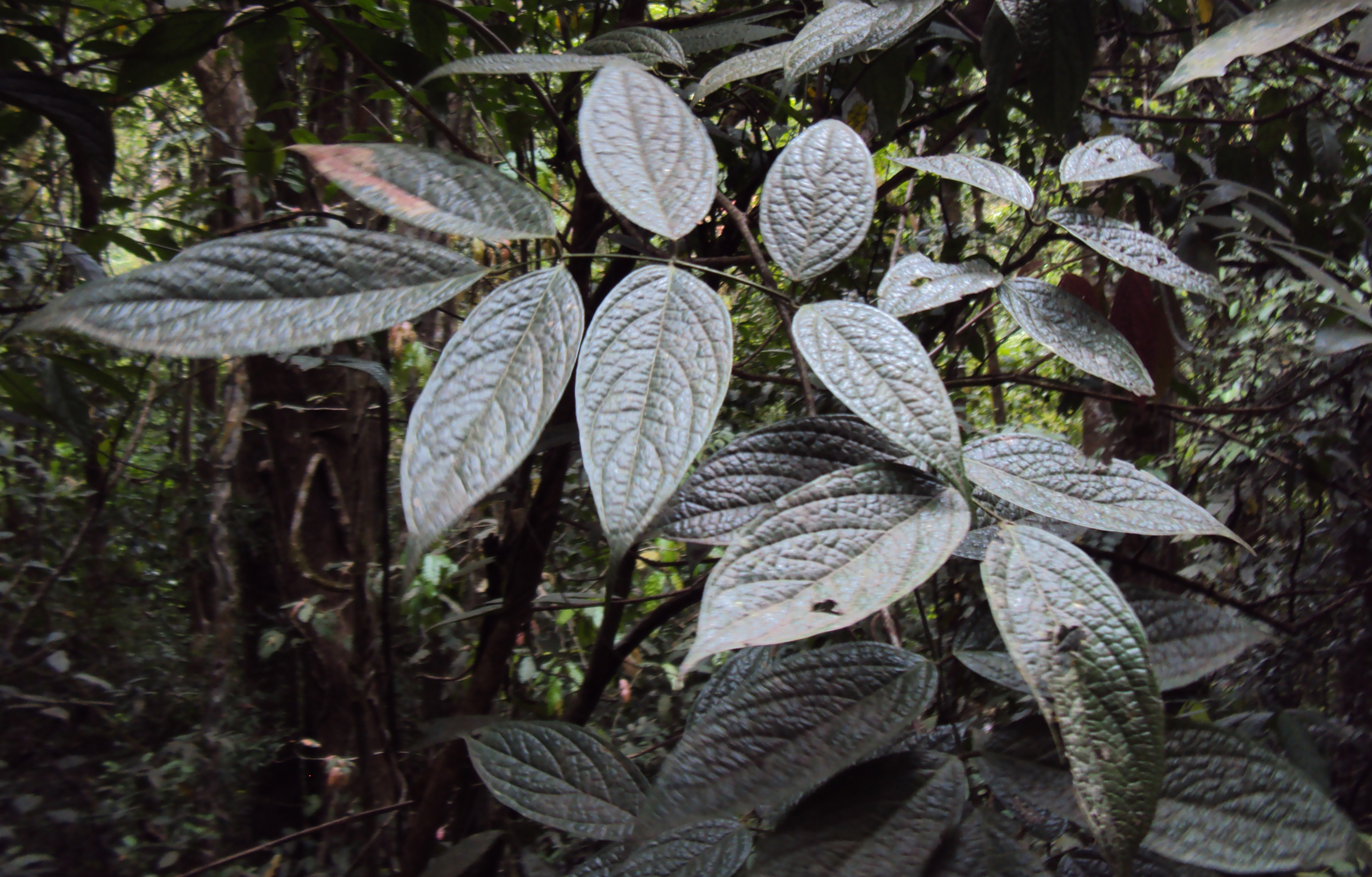
- Kunstleria keralensis

Scientific classification
- Kingdom: Plantae
- Clade: Tracheophytes
- Clade: Angiosperms
- Clade: Eudicots
- Clade: Rosids
- Order: Fabales
- Family: Fabaceae
- Subfamily: Faboideae
- Tribe: Millettieae
- Genus: Kunstleria; Prain (1897)

Species
- 8; see text

= Kunstleria =

Genus of legumes

Kunstleria is a genus of flowering plants in the family Fabaceae. It belongs to the subfamily Faboideae. It grows as a woody climber or liana. It includes eight species native to India, Thailand, Peninsular Malaysia, Sumatra, Borneo, and the Philippines. Species Kunstleria keralensis is found in the southern Western Ghats of India.

- Kunstleria curtisii Prain
- Kunstleria forbesii Prain
- Kunstleria geesinkii Ridd.-Num. & Kornet
- Kunstleria keralensis C.N.Mohanan & N.C.Nair
- Kunstleria kingii Prain
- Kunstleria philippinensis Merr.
- Kunstleria ridleyi Prain
- Kunstleria sarawakensis Ridd.-Num. & Kornet
