= Syzygium myhendrae =

Conservation status
- Endangered (IUCN 2.3)

Scientific classification
- Kingdom: Plantae
- Clade: Tracheophytes
- Clade: Angiosperms
- Clade: Eudicots
- Clade: Rosids
- Order: Myrtales
- Family: Myrtaceae
- Genus: Syzygium
- Species: S. myhendrae

Binomial name
- Syzygium myhendrae (Bedd. ex Brandis) Gamble

Synonyms
- Eugenia myhendrae Bedd. ex Brandis

Species of flowering plant

Syzygium myhendrae is a species of flowering plant in the family Myrtaceae. It is a tree native to Kerala and Tamil Nadu in southern India. It is known from the Travancore Range and Agasthyamalai Hills in the southern Western Ghats, where it grows in submontane forest.
