= Syzygium microphyllum =

Conservation status
- Endangered (IUCN 2.3)

Scientific classification
- Kingdom: Plantae
- Clade: Tracheophytes
- Clade: Angiosperms
- Clade: Eudicots
- Clade: Rosids
- Order: Myrtales
- Family: Myrtaceae
- Genus: Syzygium
- Species: S. microphyllum

Binomial name
- Syzygium microphyllum Gamble

Synonyms
- Eugenia microphylla Bedd., nom. illeg. homonym. post.; Syzygium gambleanum Rathakr. & V.Chithra, nom illeg.

Species of flowering plant

Syzygium microphyllum is a species of flowering plant in the family Myrtaceae. It is a tree endemic to Kerala and Tamil Nadu in southwestern India. It is known from the Agasthyamalai Hills, where it grows at the margins of montane rain forest. It is threatened by habitat loss.

In 1998 the now disputed taxon Syzygium gambleanum was listed as extinct in the IUCN Red List. However, after research work by the Royal Botanic Gardens Kew this plant was revealed as identical with Syzygium microphyllum and so the name Syzygium gambleanum became an illegitimate synonym.
