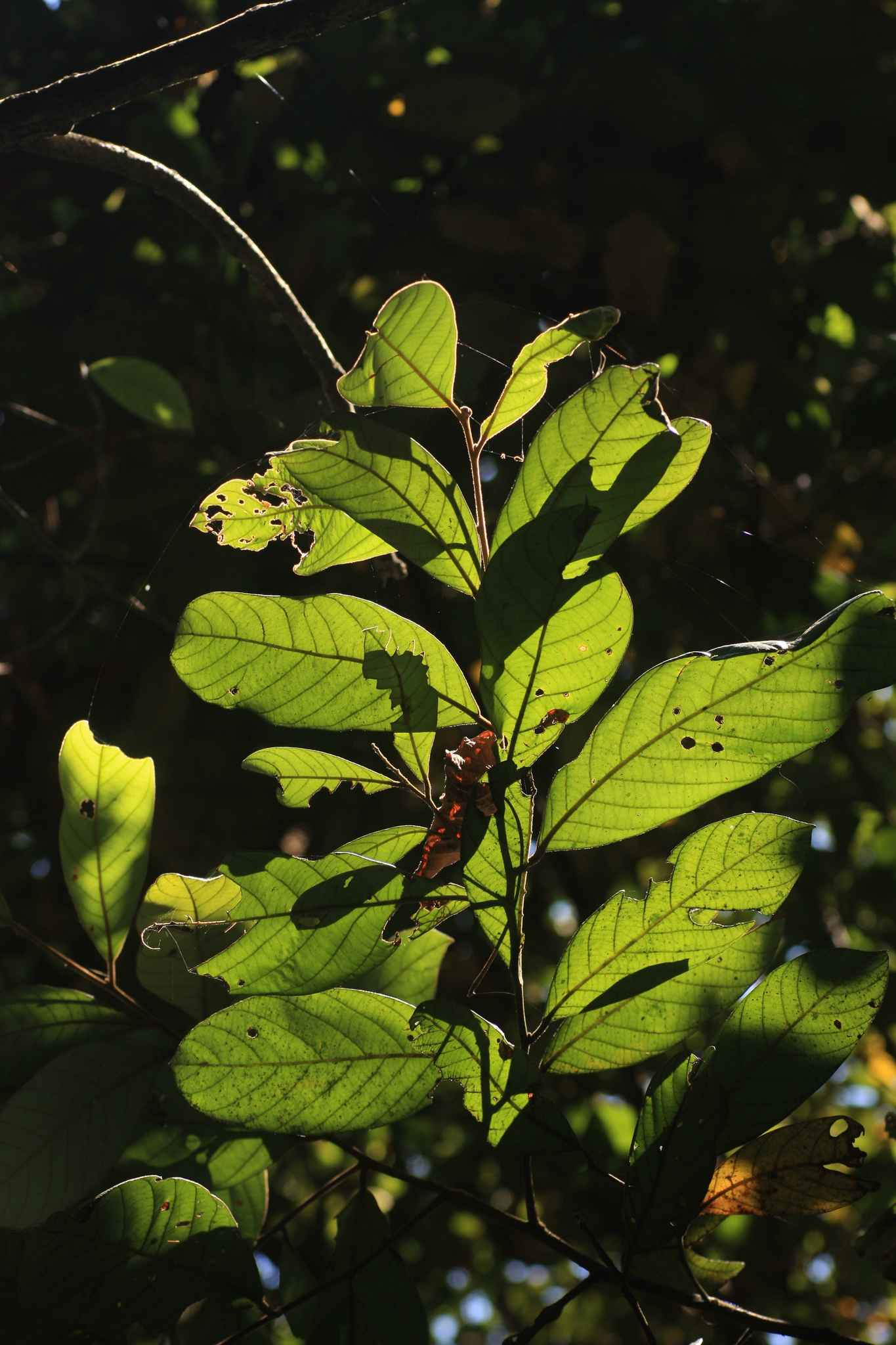

Conservation status
- Endangered (IUCN 3.1)

Scientific classification
- Kingdom: Plantae
- Clade: Tracheophytes
- Clade: Angiosperms
- Clade: Magnoliids
- Order: Laurales
- Family: Lauraceae
- Genus: Cryptocarya
- Species: C. anamalayana

Binomial name
- Cryptocarya anamalayana Gamble

= Cryptocarya anamalayana =

Species of tree

Cryptocarya anamalayana is a rare rainforest tree endemic to the southern Western Ghats, India. The specific epithet of the name refers to the Anamalai Hills, a major area of its distribution. The species considered endangered under the IUCN Red List of Threatened Species.

== Description ==
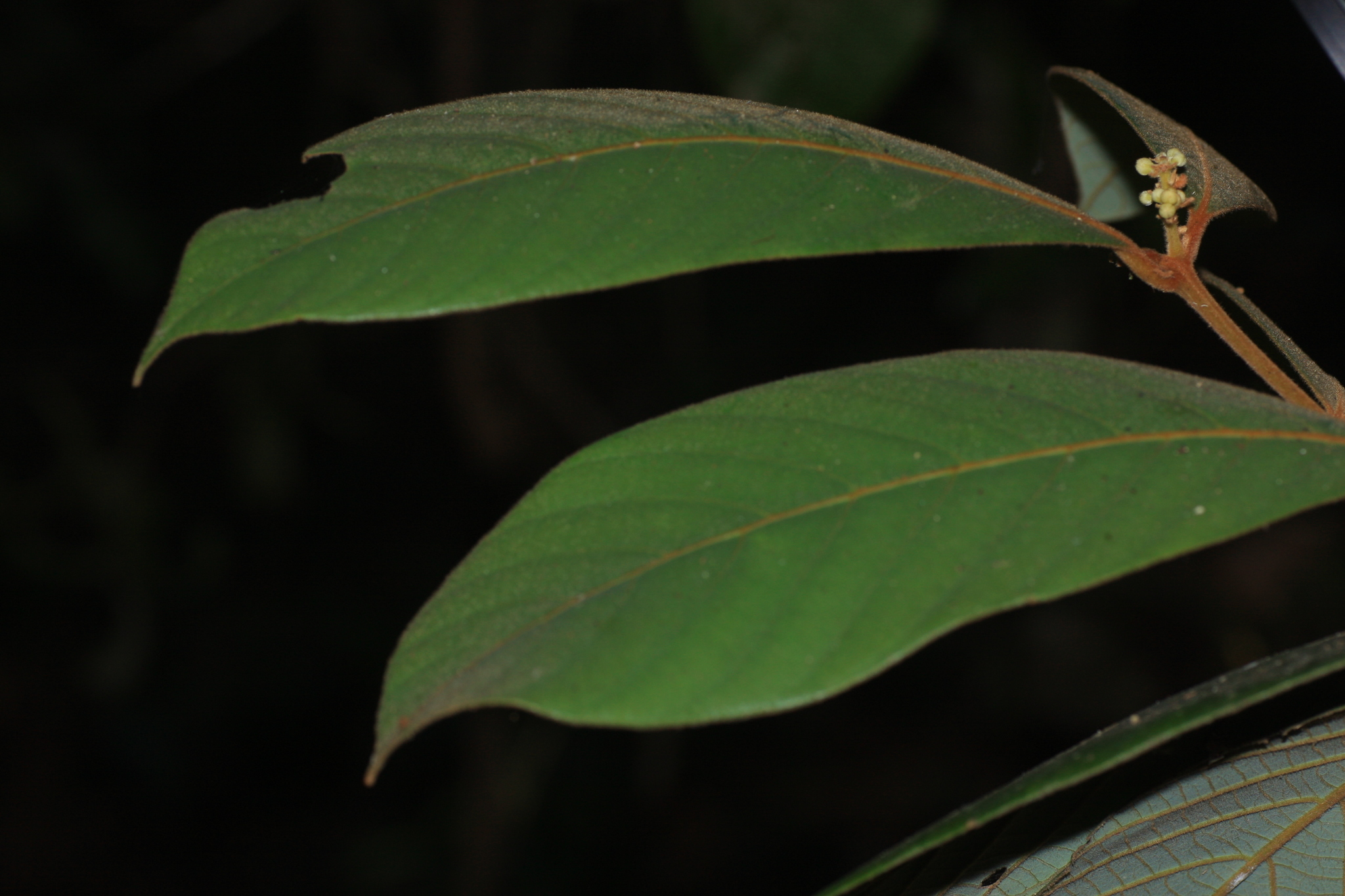
Leaves and inflorescence

Small, rare evergreen trees up to 8 metres tall with greyish-brown, smooth bark and characteristic fulvous tomentose branchlets, young shoots, and leaves. The thick, coriaceous leaves are simple, alternate, and spirally arranged on the branchlets, with petioles about 1.2 cm long and a leaf blade of 8.5-20 cm length by 3.5-9 cm width. The leaf shape is elliptic-oblong and it has a sharp acuminate apex, while the base is acute or rounded. The leaves are pale glaucous beneath. The nerves are fulvous tomentose on both sides of the leaves and the midrib is raised. About 8 pairs of secondary nerves are there in each leaf and the tertiary nerves are distinct and obliquely parallel. The flowers are bisexual, arranged in short cymose panicles (also fulvous tomentose) up to 3 cm long, with prominent oblong bracts and bracteoles that are apparently persistent. The flowers have 9 stamens in 3 rows, with 2-celled anthers. The ovary is sessile, half inferior with a short, exserted style. The fruit is a drupe, with a single seed. The fruit is oblong and has 10-12 ridges along its length (2.5-4.0 cm long × 0.8–1.3 cm wide) and is obtuse at its ends, sparsely hairy, light to bright green when young and glossy black when ripe.

== Distribution ==
Endemic to the southern ranges of the Western Ghats from the Agasthyamalai region in the south, through Periyar and Anamalai.

== Habitat ==
Found in medium-elevation tropical wet evergreen forests between 1000 and 1400 m. It is reported to be very rare in evergreen and wet evergreen forests on hill slopes between 600 and 1200 m in four disjunct locations along the southern Western Ghats.

== Ecology ==
These are rare understorey trees in tropical wet evergreen forest. The species is reported to flower and fruit between April and August.

== Gallery ==
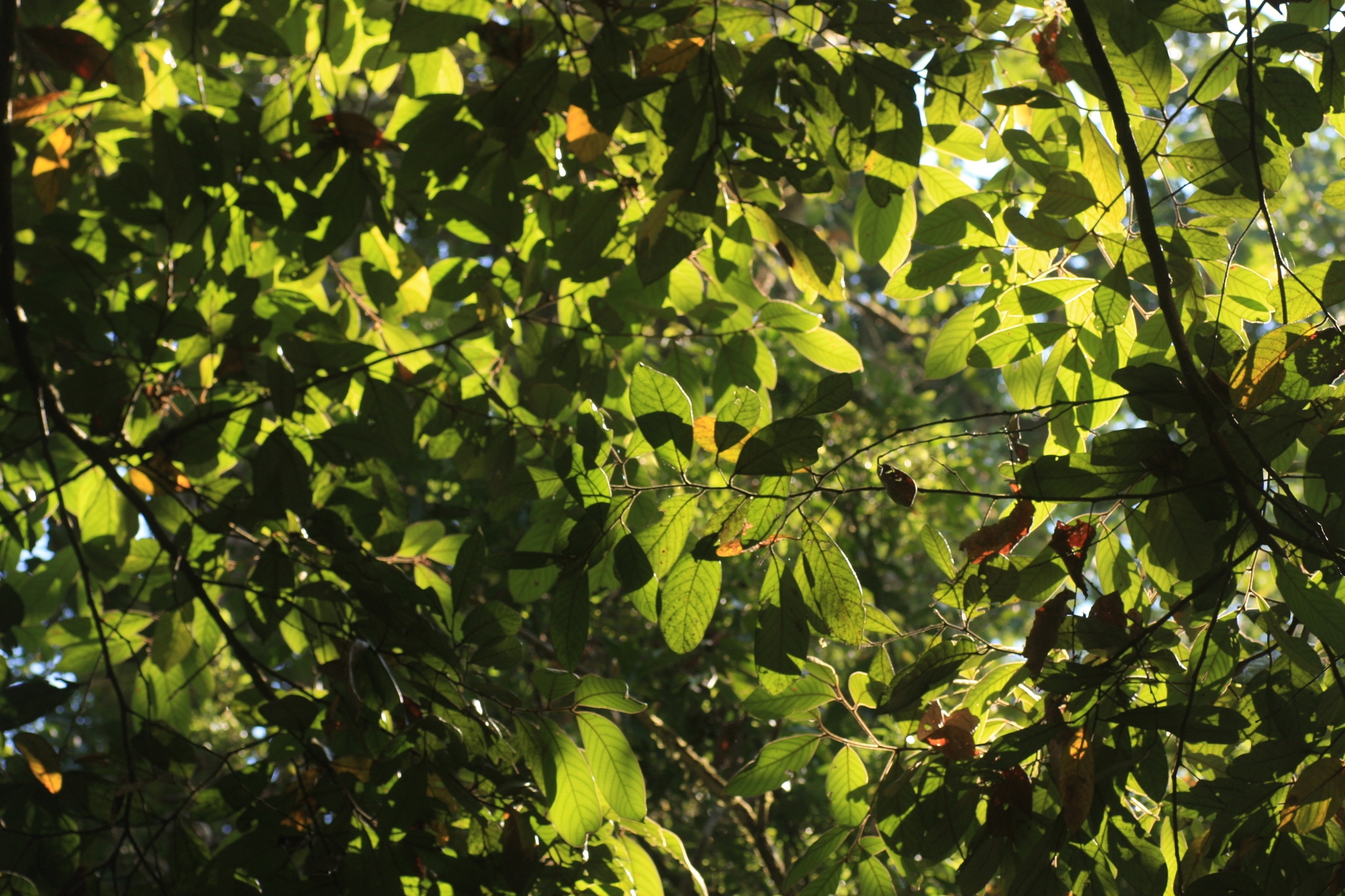
Branchlets

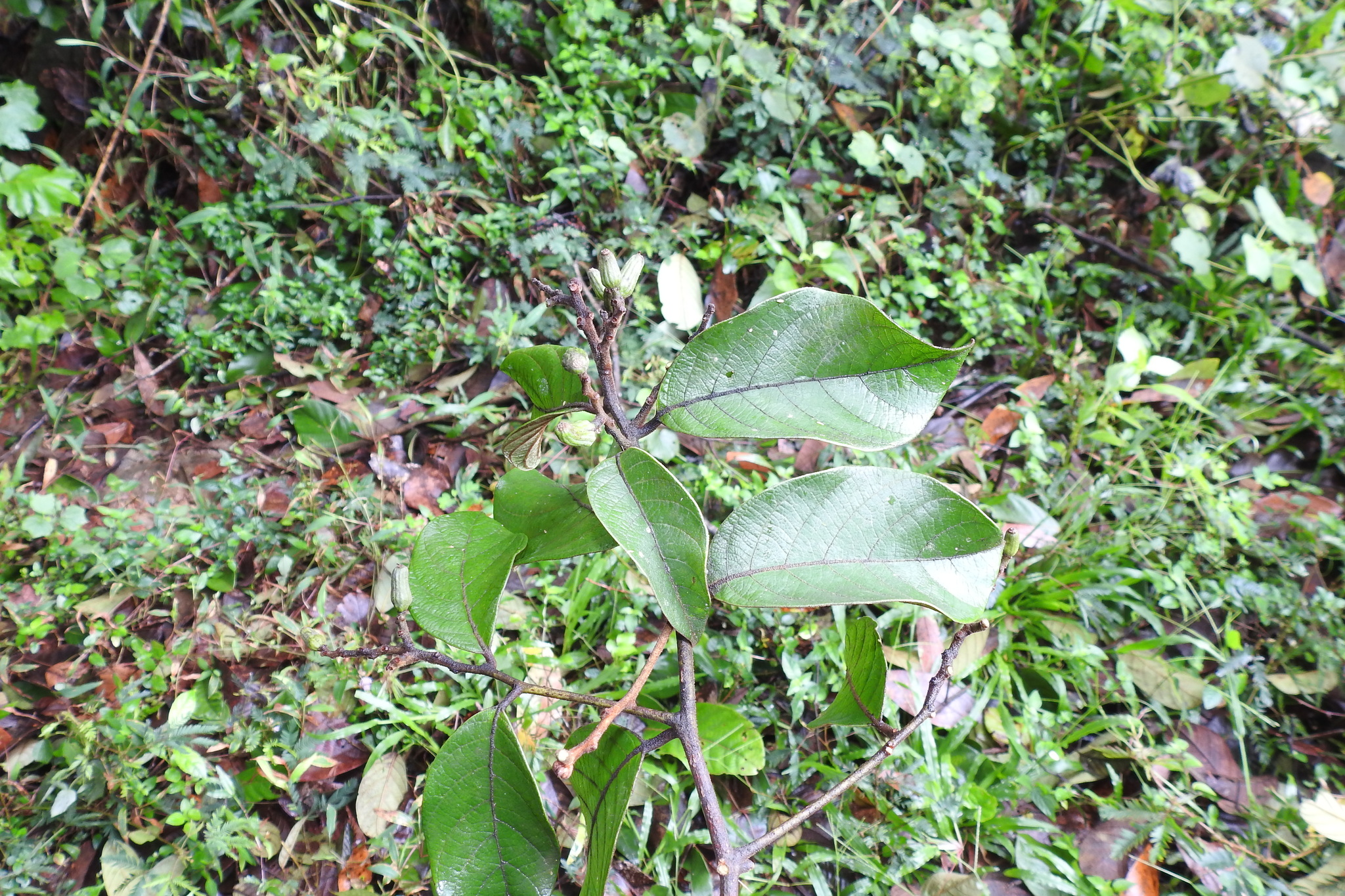
Leaves

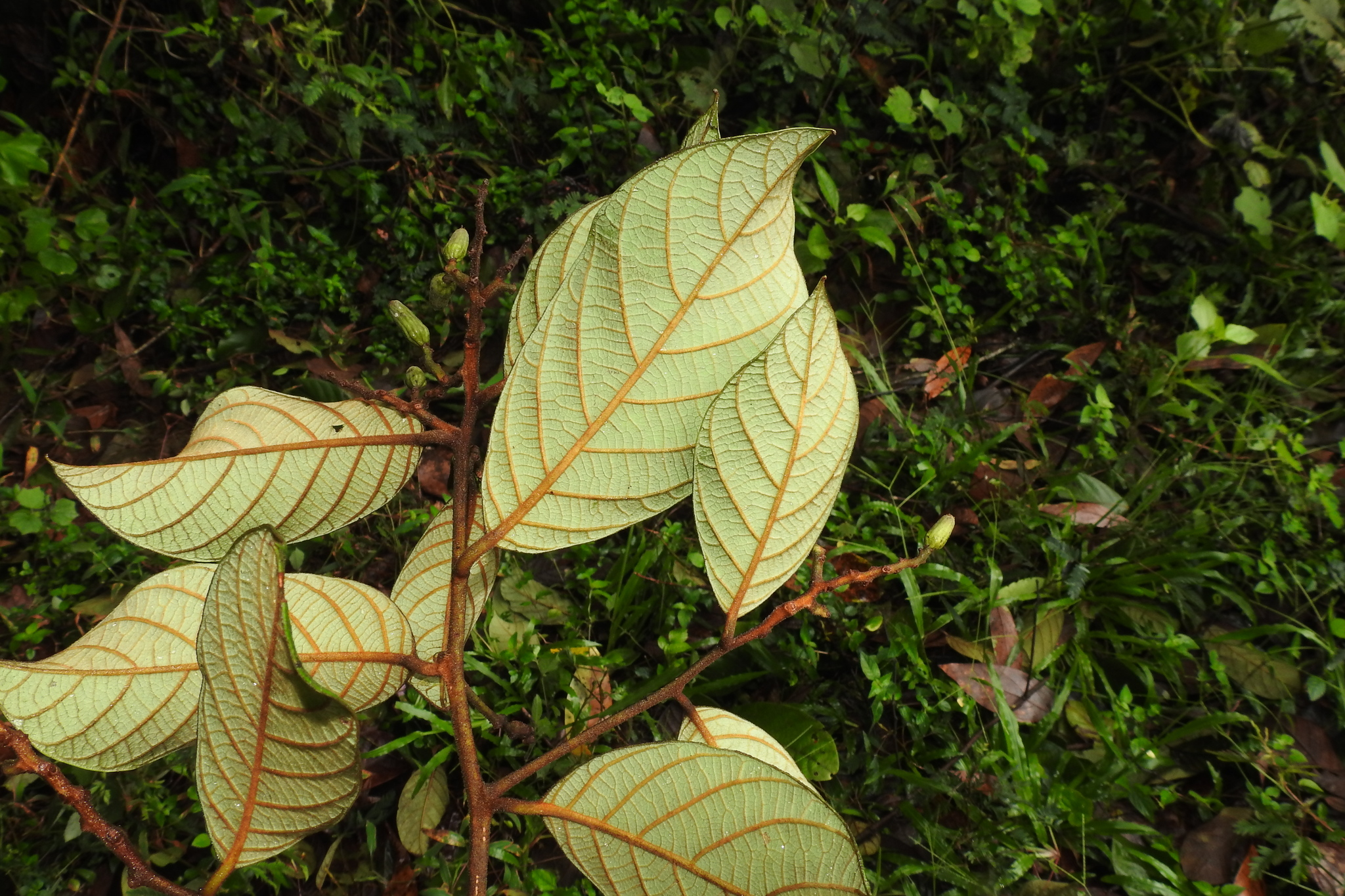
Underside of leaves

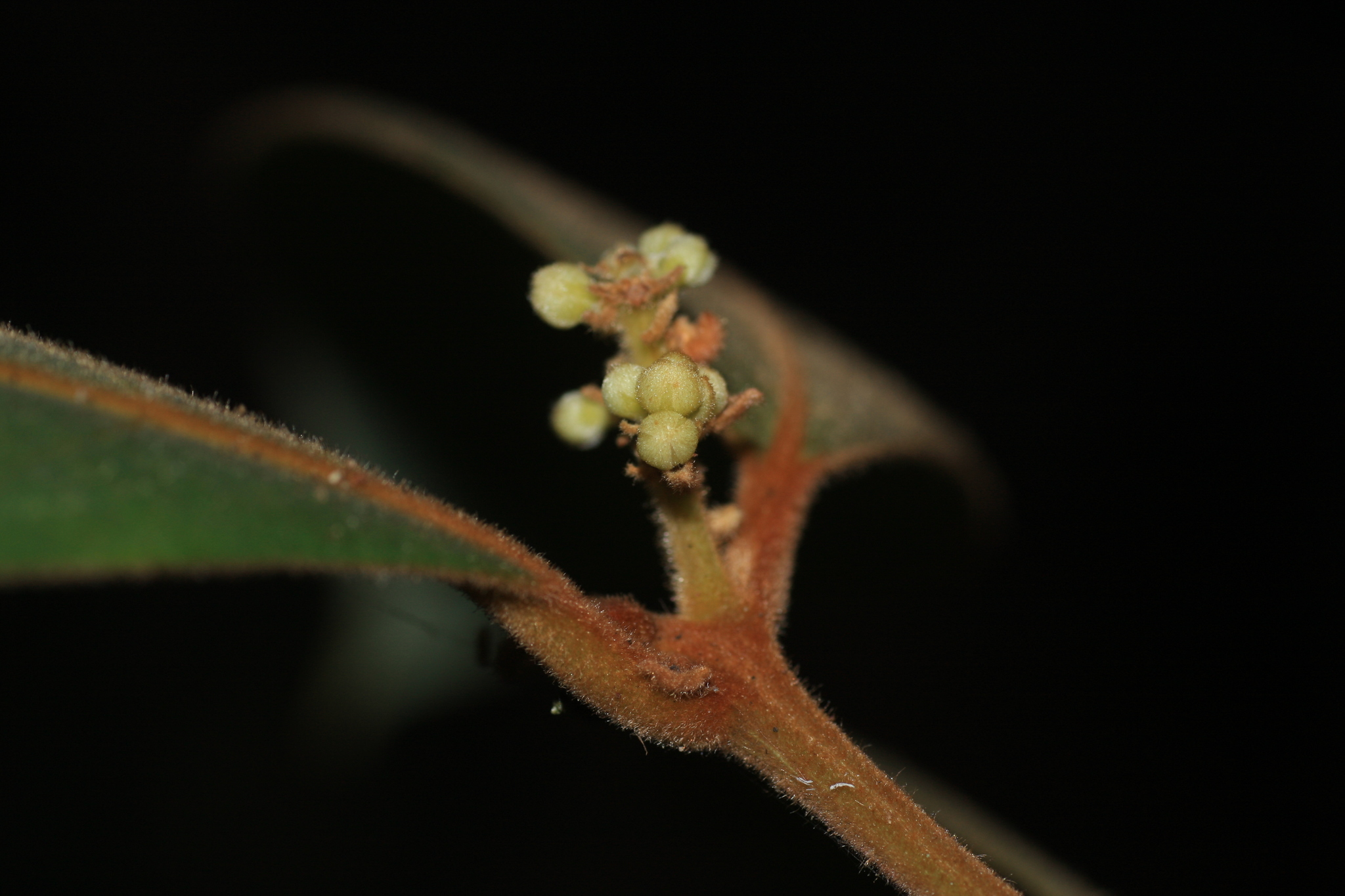
Close up of inflorescence

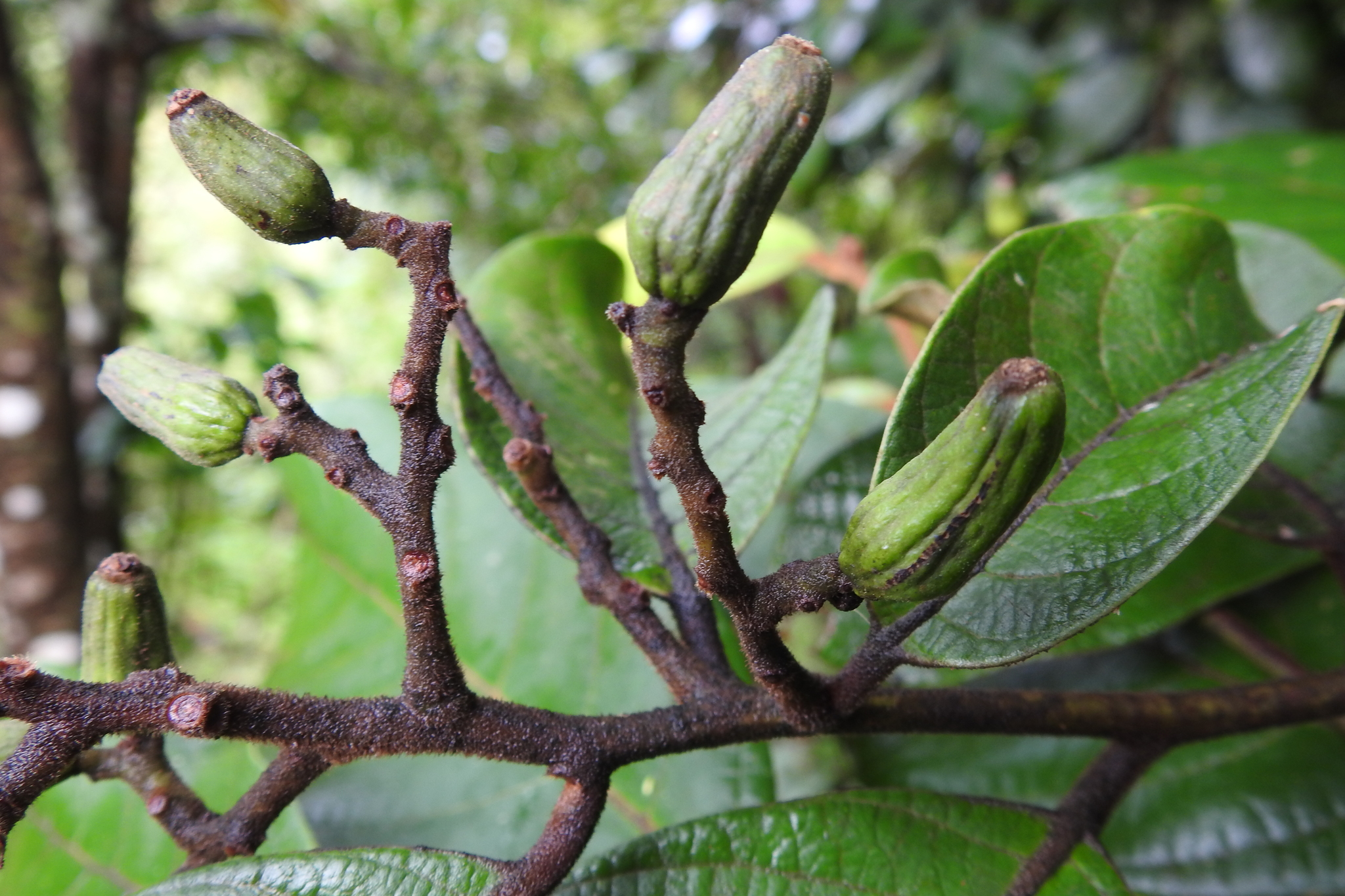
Fruits

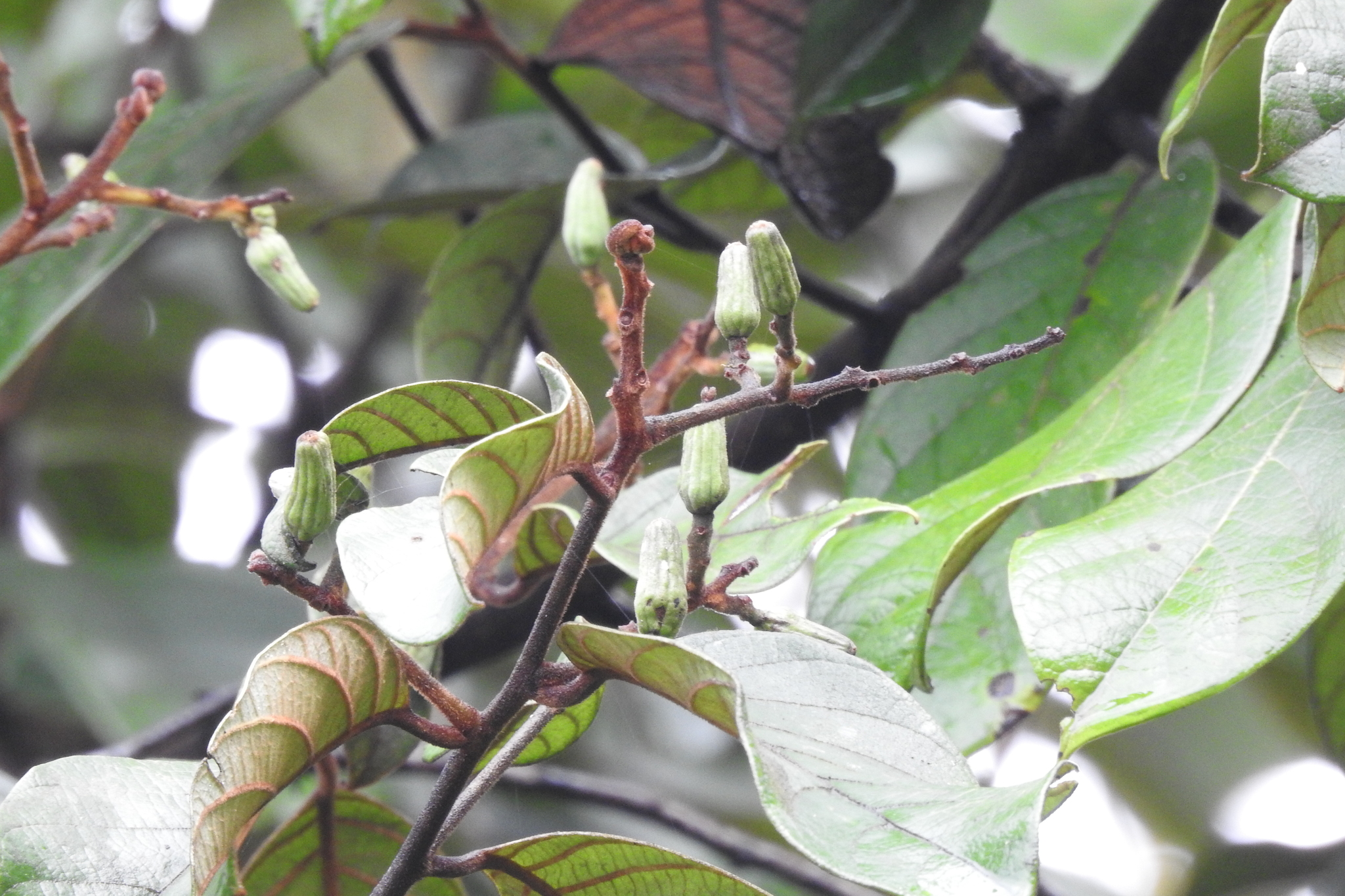
Branchlet with fruits

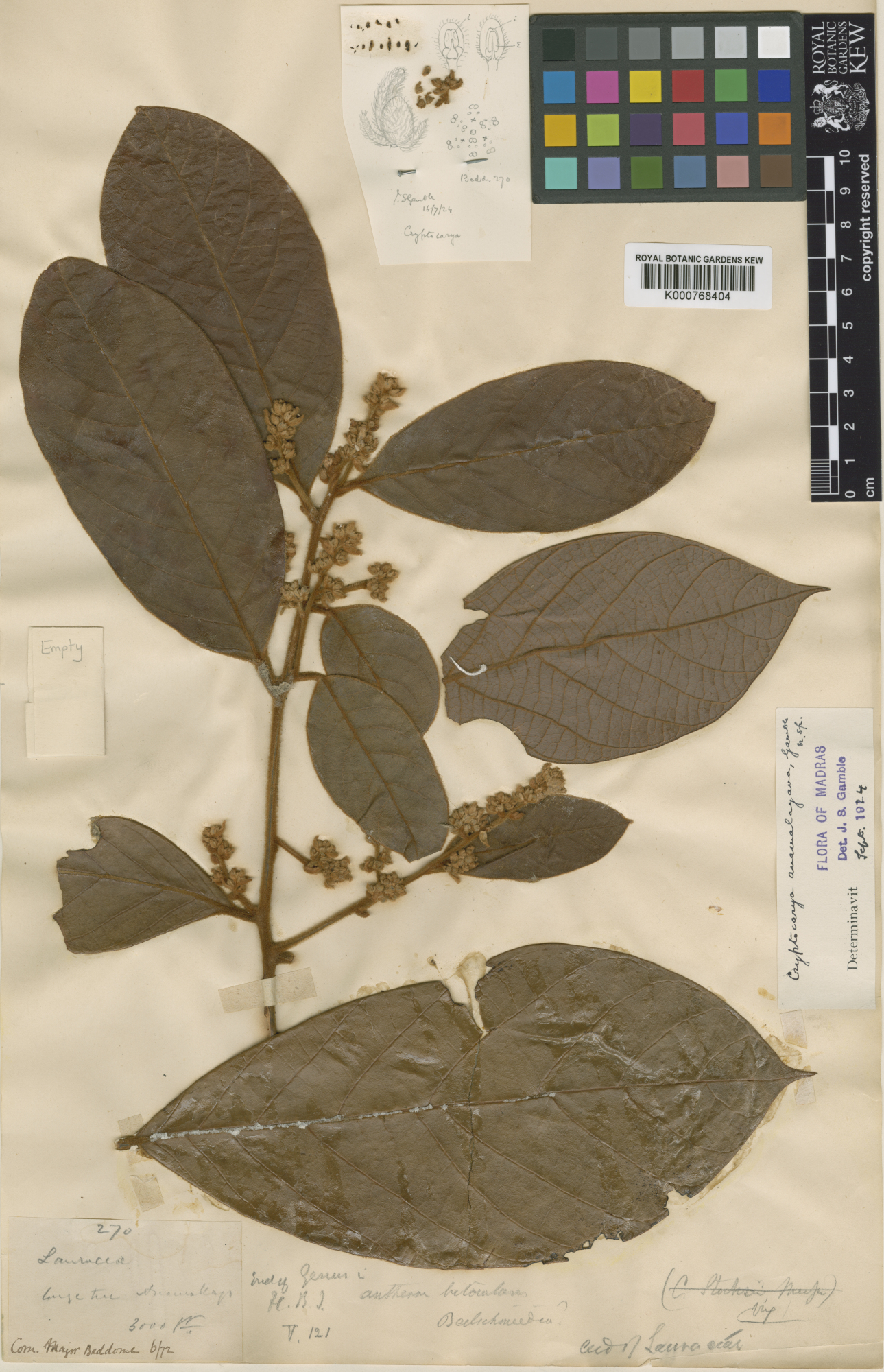
Herbarium specimen from the Anamalai Hills
