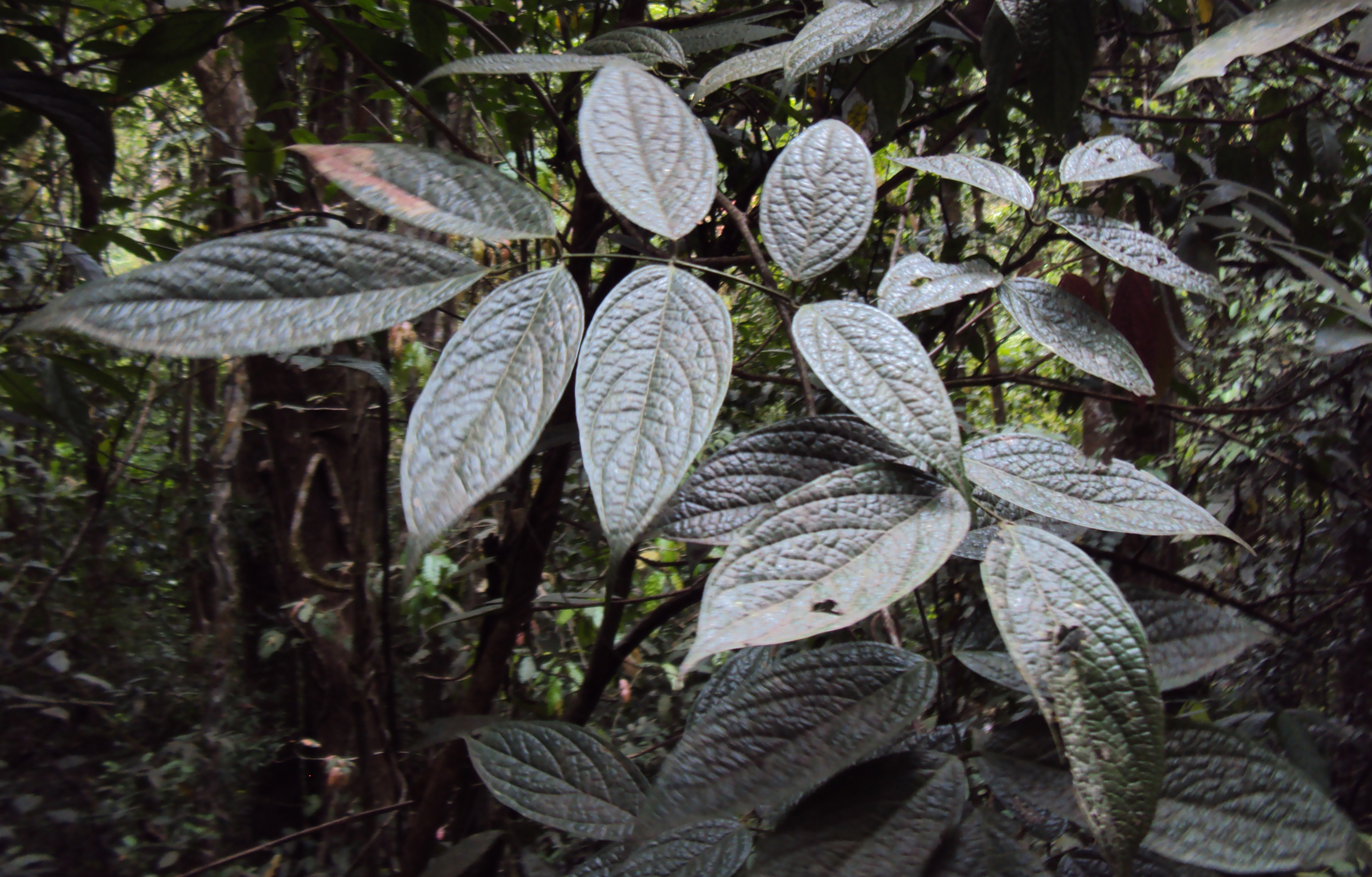

Scientific classification
- Kingdom: Plantae
- Clade: Tracheophytes
- Clade: Angiosperms
- Clade: Eudicots
- Clade: Rosids
- Order: Fabales
- Family: Fabaceae
- Subfamily: Faboideae
- Genus: Kunstleria
- Species: K. keralensis

Binomial name
- Kunstleria keralensis C.N.Mohanan & N.C.Nair

= Kunstleria keralensis =

Species of plant

Kunstleria keralensis is a species of flowering plant in the family Fabaceae, subfamily Faboideae. It is a woody climber (liana) native to the southern parts of the Western Ghats, India.
