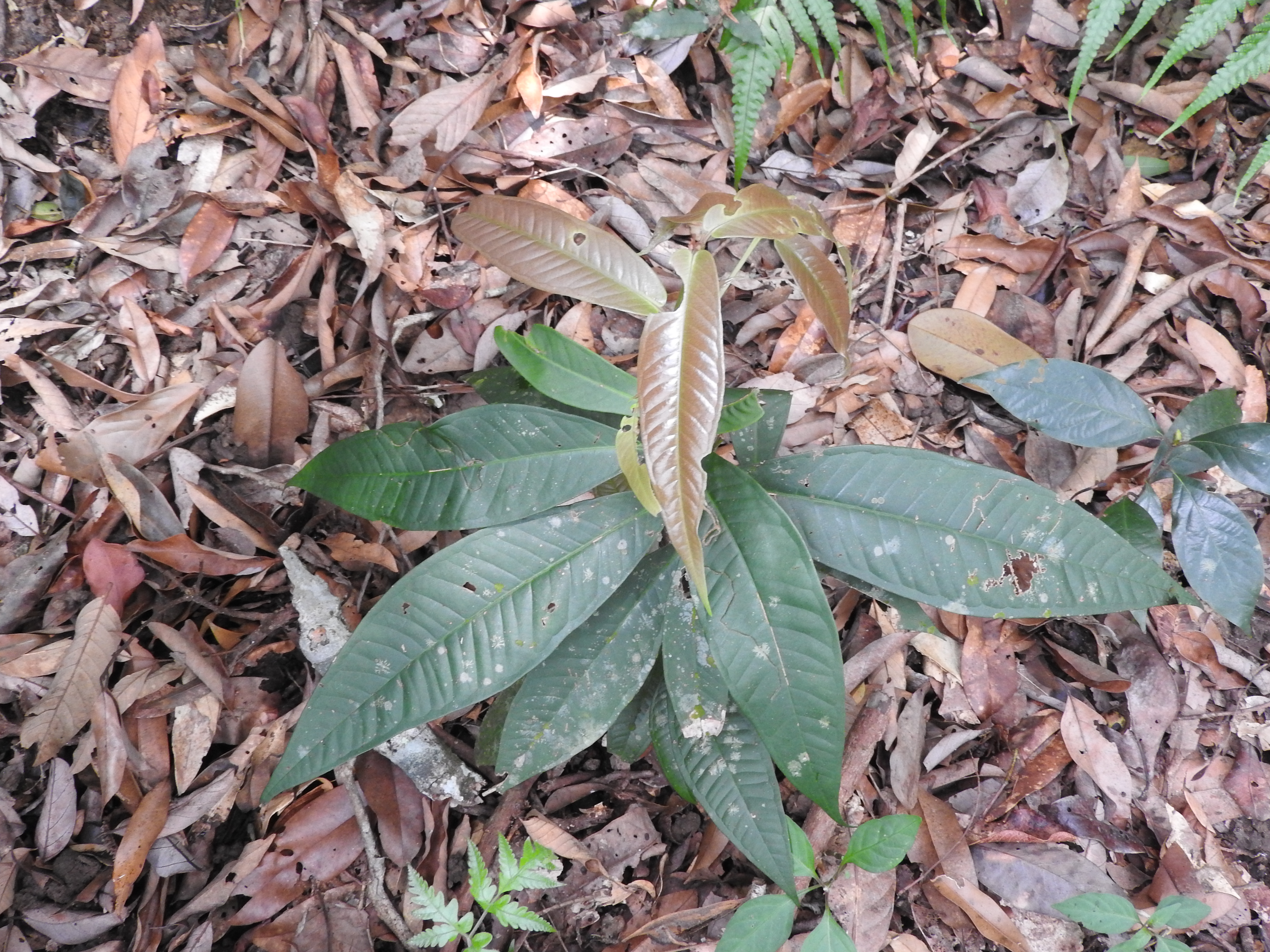

Conservation status
- Endangered (IUCN 3.1)

Scientific classification
- Kingdom: Plantae
- Clade: Tracheophytes
- Clade: Angiosperms
- Clade: Eudicots
- Clade: Rosids
- Order: Myrtales
- Family: Myrtaceae
- Genus: Syzygium
- Species: S. bourdillonii

Binomial name
- Syzygium bourdillonii (Gamble) Rathakr. & Nair

Synonyms
- Jambosa bourdillonii Gamble

= Syzygium bourdillonii =

Species of flowering plant

Syzygium bourdillonii is a species of flowering plant in the family Myrtaceae. It is a small evergreen tree endemic to the southern Western Ghats of Kerala and Tamil Nadu in southwestern India. It grows in streamside evergreen riparian forests from 660 to 1,200 metres elevation. It is threatened by habitat loss from the construction of dams and reservoirs.
