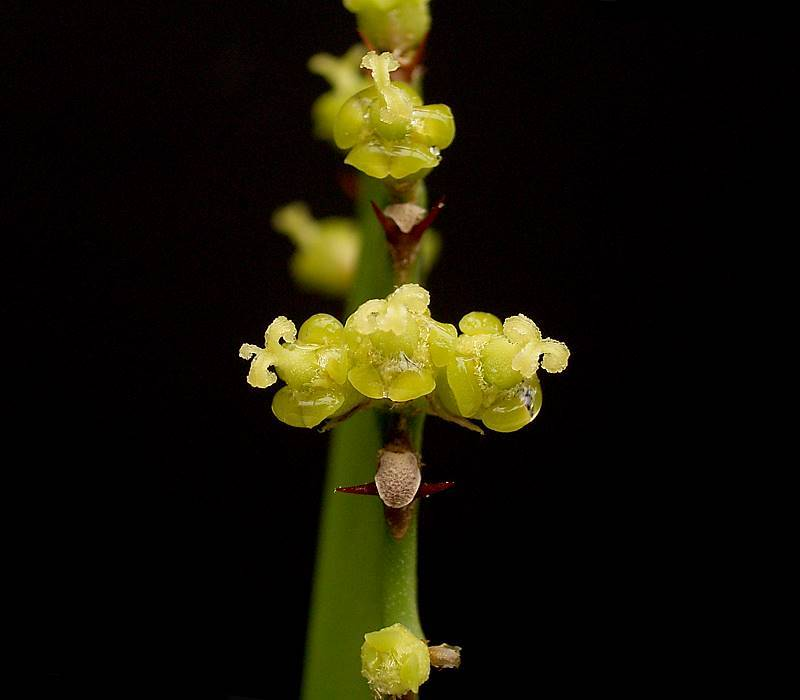

Conservation status
- Vulnerable (IUCN 2.3)

Scientific classification
- Kingdom: Plantae
- Clade: Tracheophytes
- Clade: Angiosperms
- Clade: Eudicots
- Clade: Rosids
- Order: Malpighiales
- Family: Euphorbiaceae
- Genus: Euphorbia
- Species: E. vajravelui

Binomial name
- Euphorbia vajravelui Binojk. & Balakr.

= Euphorbia vajravelui =

Species of flowering plant

Euphorbia vajravelui is a plant species in the family Euphorbiaceae. It is endemic to Tamil Nadu in India.
