= Syzygium densiflorum =

Conservation status
- Vulnerable (IUCN 3.1)

Scientific classification
- Kingdom: Plantae
- Clade: Tracheophytes
- Clade: Angiosperms
- Clade: Eudicots
- Clade: Rosids
- Order: Myrtales
- Family: Myrtaceae
- Genus: Syzygium
- Species: S. densiflorum

Binomial name
- Syzygium densiflorum Wall. ex Wight & Arn.

Synonyms
- Eugenia arnottiana Wight, nom. illeg. superfl.; Syzygium arnottianum Walp., nom. illeg. superfl.

Species of flowering plant

Syzygium densiflorum is a species of evergreen tree in the family Myrtaceae. It is endemic to the Western Ghats mountains, India. The species is categorised as Vulnerable in the IUCN Red List.

== Description ==
These are large canopy trees up to 35 m tall. The tree trunk is cylindrical, with grey or blackish-grey bark, smooth or rough and shiny. The canopy fans out into branchlets that are nearly cylindrical (sub-terete). The branchlets, petioles, and leaves are hairless. The leaves are simple, entire, and set in an opposite and decussate arrangement on twigs. The leaf petioles are about 1 to 2.3 cm long and canaliculate (marked with a groove). The leaf blade is about 3.5 – 9 cm long by 1.8 – 3.7 wide, elliptic or elliptic-lanceolate to elliptic oblong in shape with a pointed apex (acuminate to caudate) and an acute to attenuate base. The lamina is dotted with pellucid glands has a midrib that is grooved above, and a nerve running parallel to the margin (intra-marginal nerve). The leaves have many slender parallel secondary nerves, while the tertiary nerves are not prominent. When dry, the leaves are olive green in colour.

The inflorescence and fruits form in terminal positions on the tips of branchlets as dense clusters, in 3-branched (trichotomous) cymes or cymose umbellules. The bisexual flowers are creamy white to white, about 10 – 12 mm long, and sessile. The petals are free and deciduous, with many free stamens. The ovary is inferior and 2-celled with many ovules, single style and simple stigma. The fruit is a fleshy berry, oblong or oblong to egg-shaped, green when unripe and purple when ripe, with a single seed.

== Taxonomy ==
The species has two known synonyms: Eugenia arnottiana Wight and Syzygium arnottianum Walp.,

== Common names ==
The species has been given a putative common name of Arnott's Mountain Black Plum, probably based on the synonym Eugenia arnottiana. Other known local names include: Umanaral (Kadar), Nir-naaval, Naaval, Nagay (Tamil), Kaattunjaval, Aatunjaval, Karinjaval, Ayuri, Karayambuvu, Njaval, and Vellanjaval (Malayalam).

== Distribution and Status ==
The species is found in the evergreen forests of the Western Ghats, in southern Karnataka, Kerala, and Tamil Nadu. It has been variously reported as occurring across an elevation range of between 1500 and 2300 m, 1200 and 2400 m, but a recent survey records occurrence between 860 and 2300 m. In Tamil Nadu, the species is reported from the Western Ghats in the Districts of Nilgiris, Coimbatore, Dindigul, Theni, Tirunelveli and Kanniyakumari. In Kerala, it occurs in the mountains in the districts of Thiruvananthapuram, Idukki, Pathanamthitta, Palakkad, Kozhikkode, Kollam, Wayanad.

The species is listed as Vulnerable.

== Ecology ==
This endemic, evergreen species occurs as a canopy tree in the mid- and high-elevation tropical wet evergreen rainforests and shola forests of the southern Western Ghats. The trees flower between March and May, and is reported to fruit between April and May or in June.

== Gallery ==
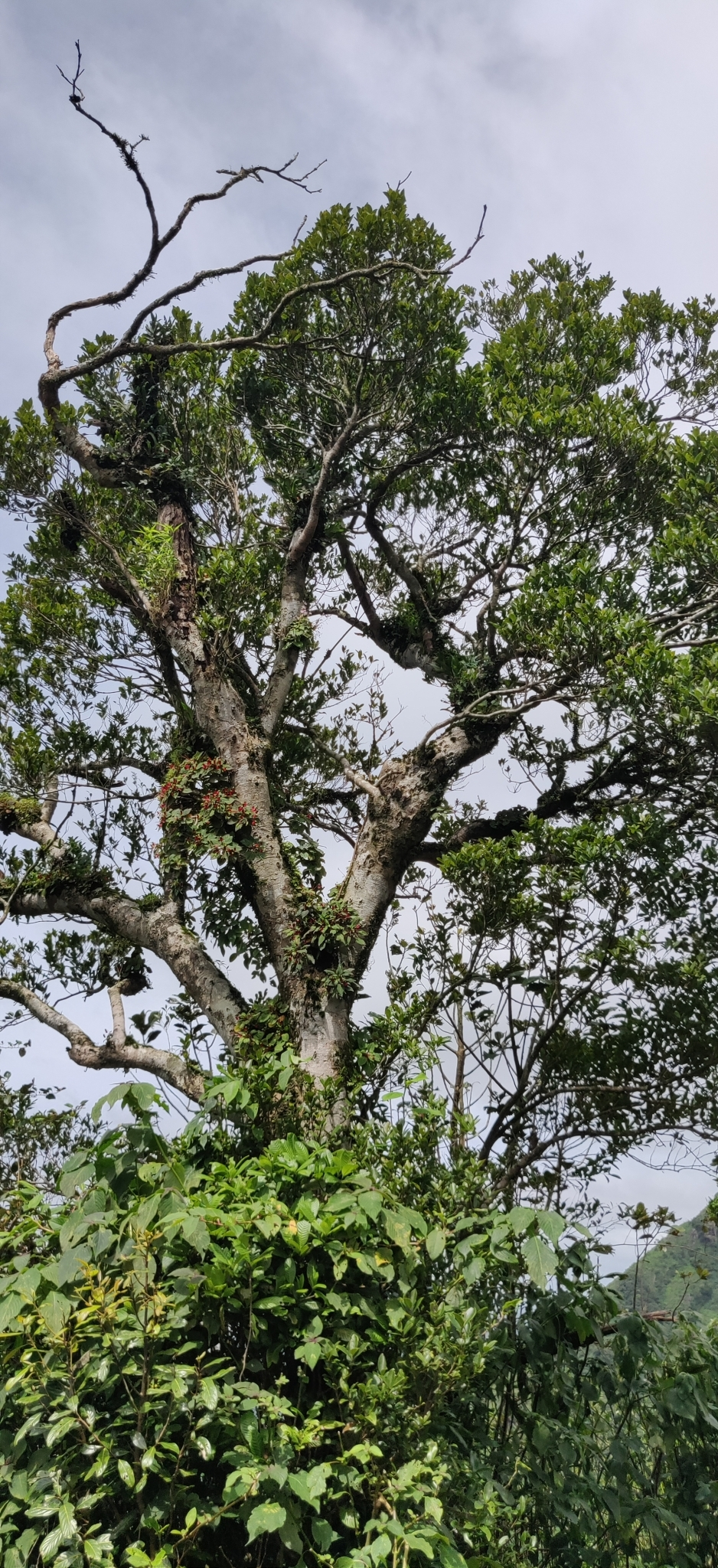
Tree canopy

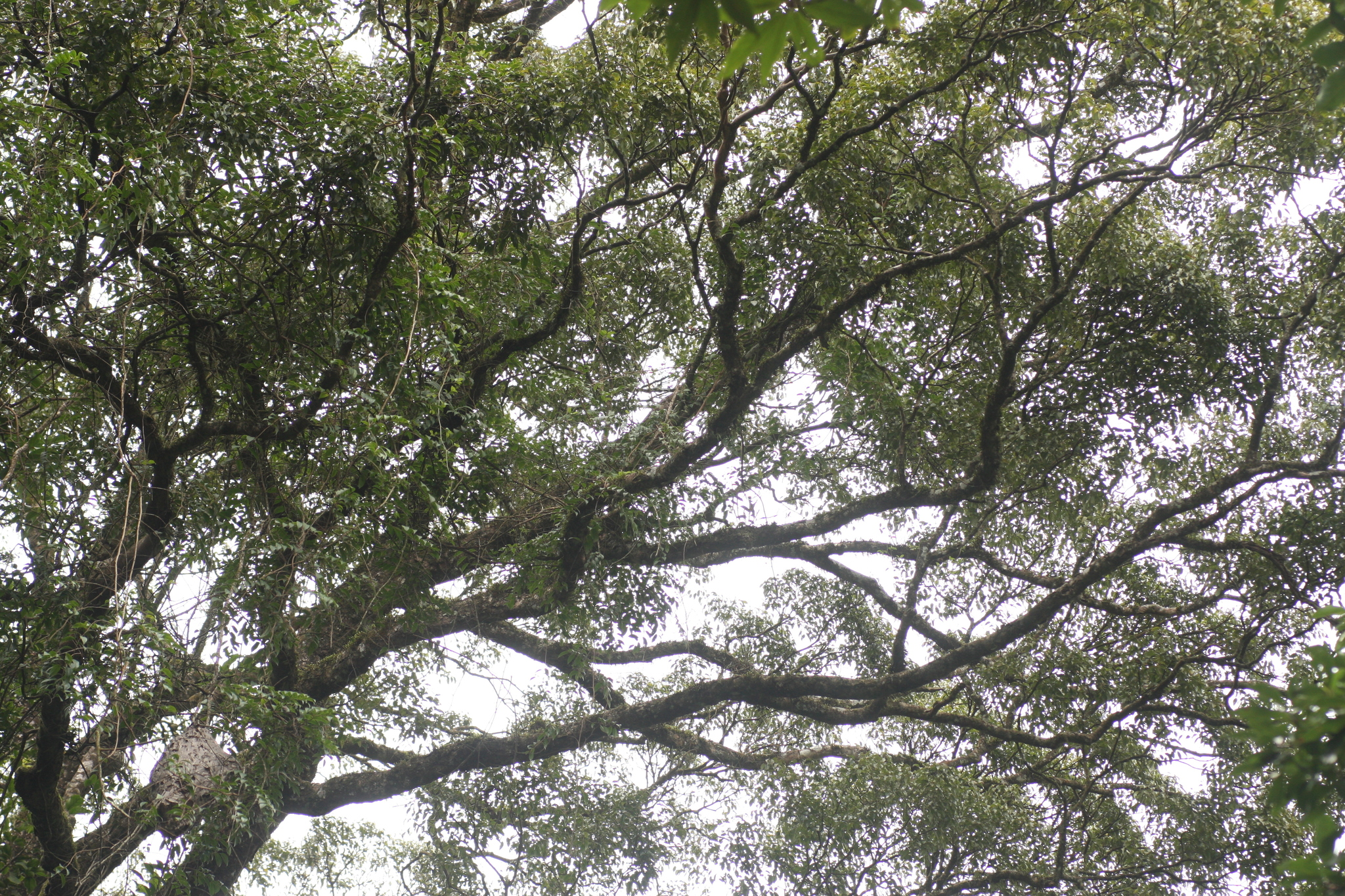
Branches

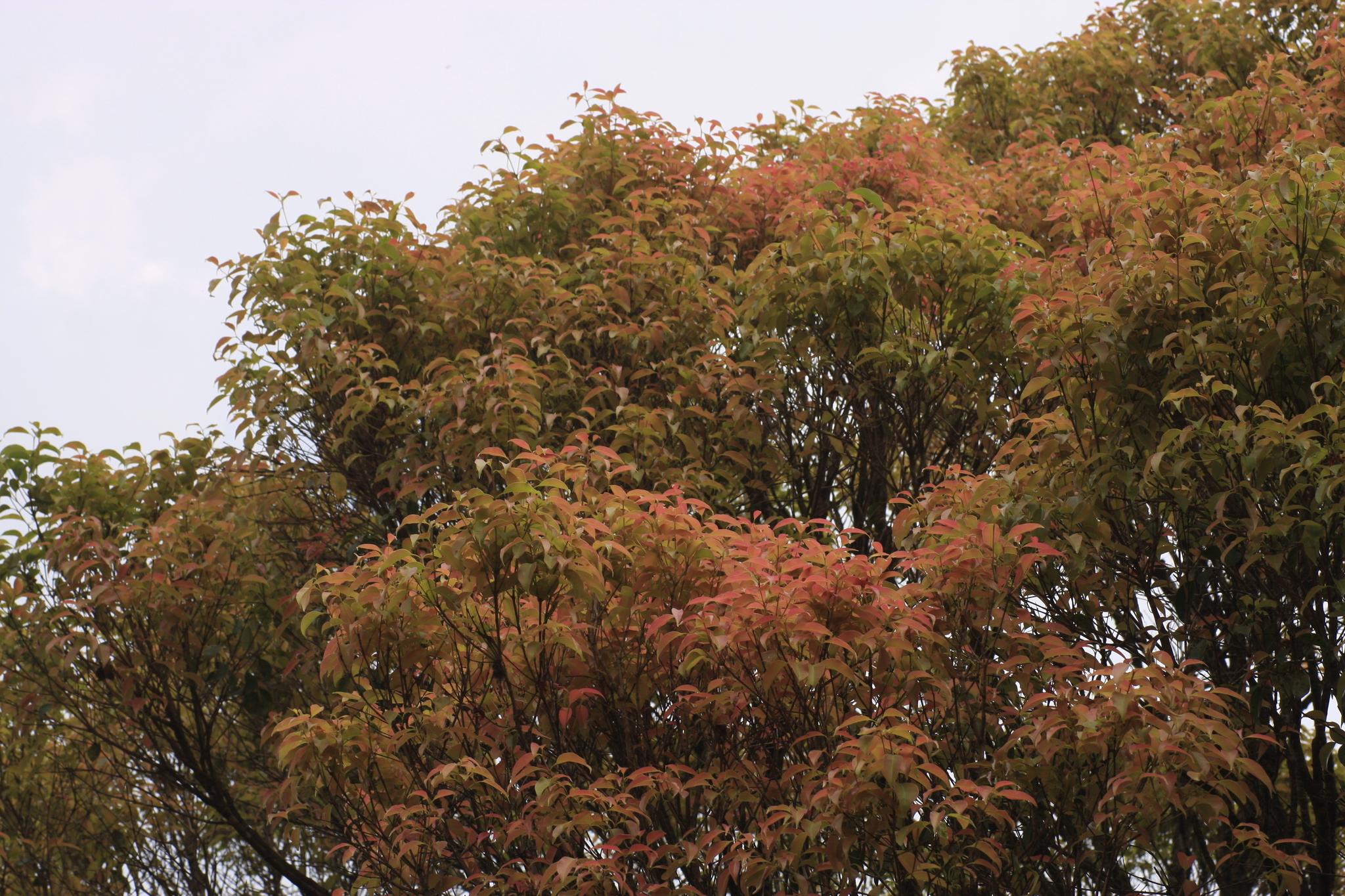
Canopy with young leaves (reddish flush)

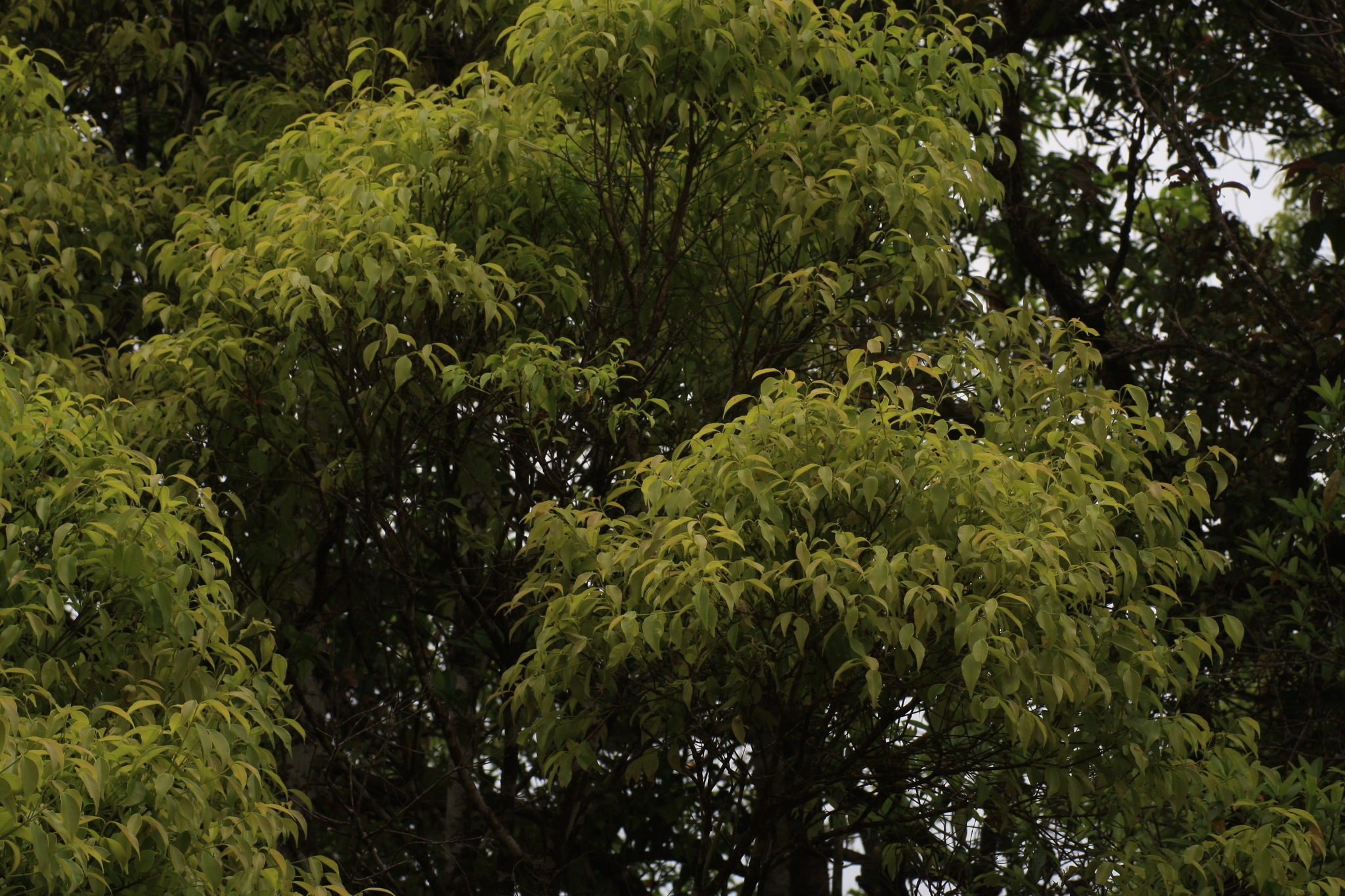
Canopy with mature leaves

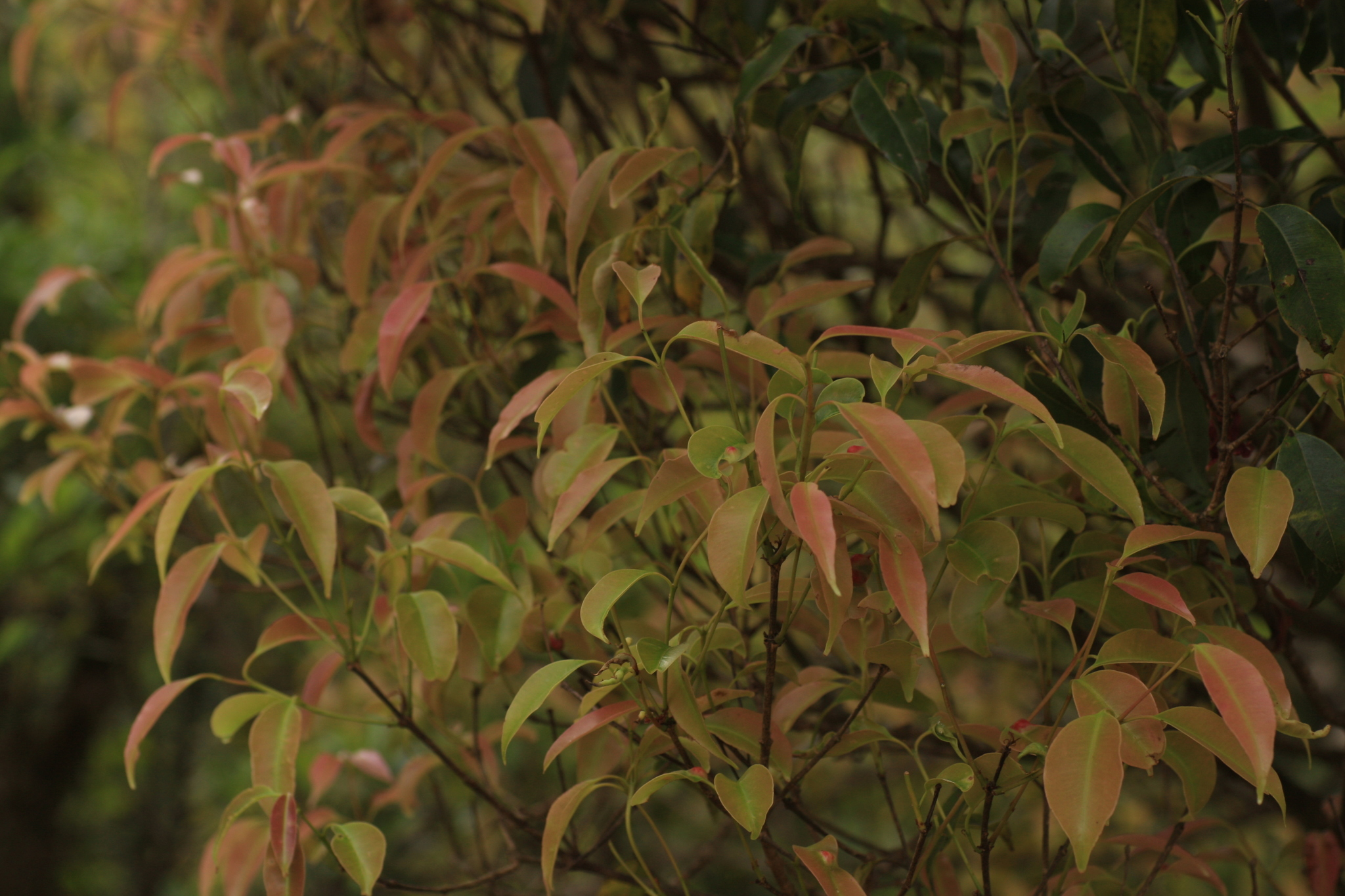
Twigs and leaves

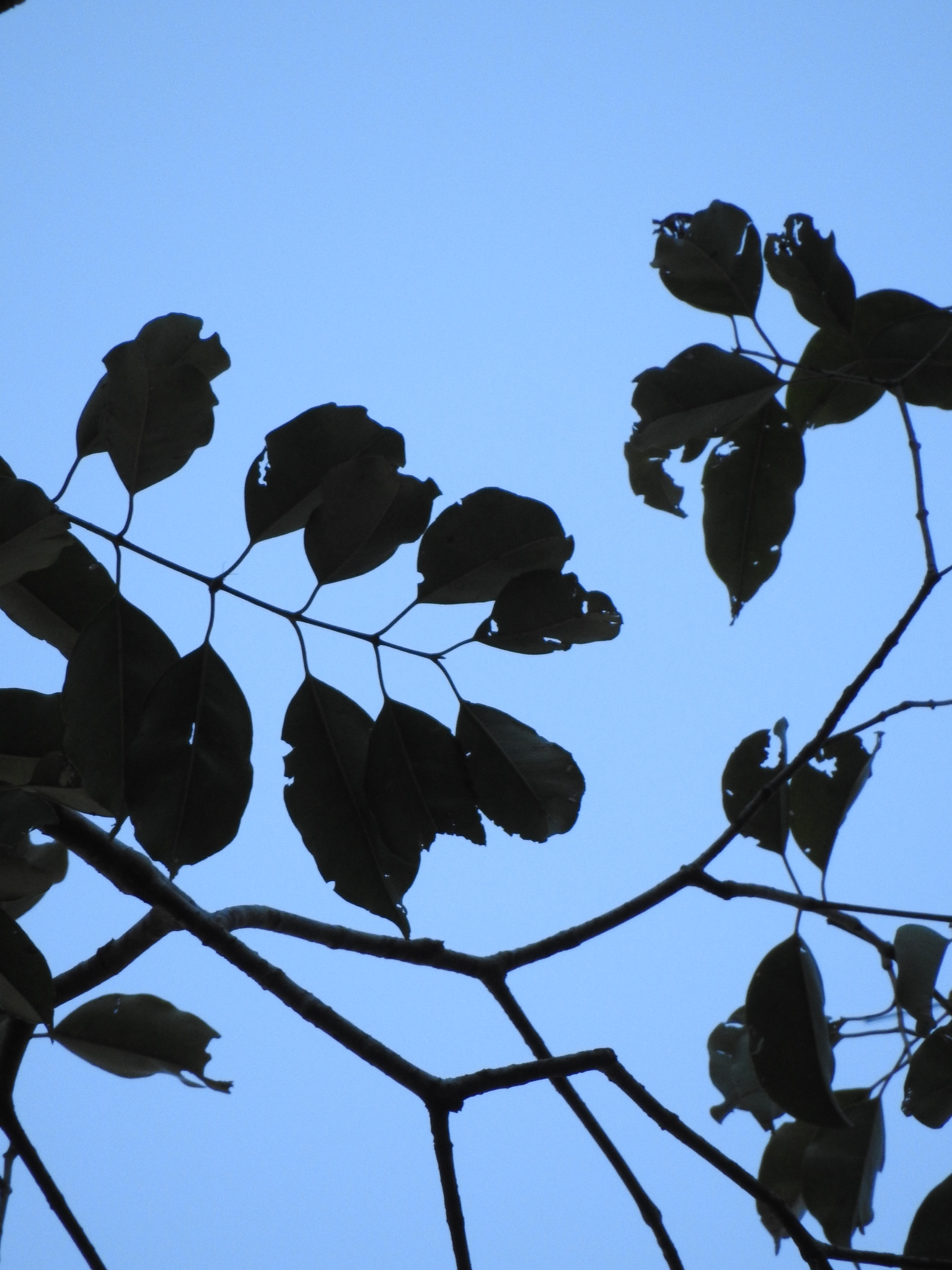
Opposite leaf arrangement and distinct petiole

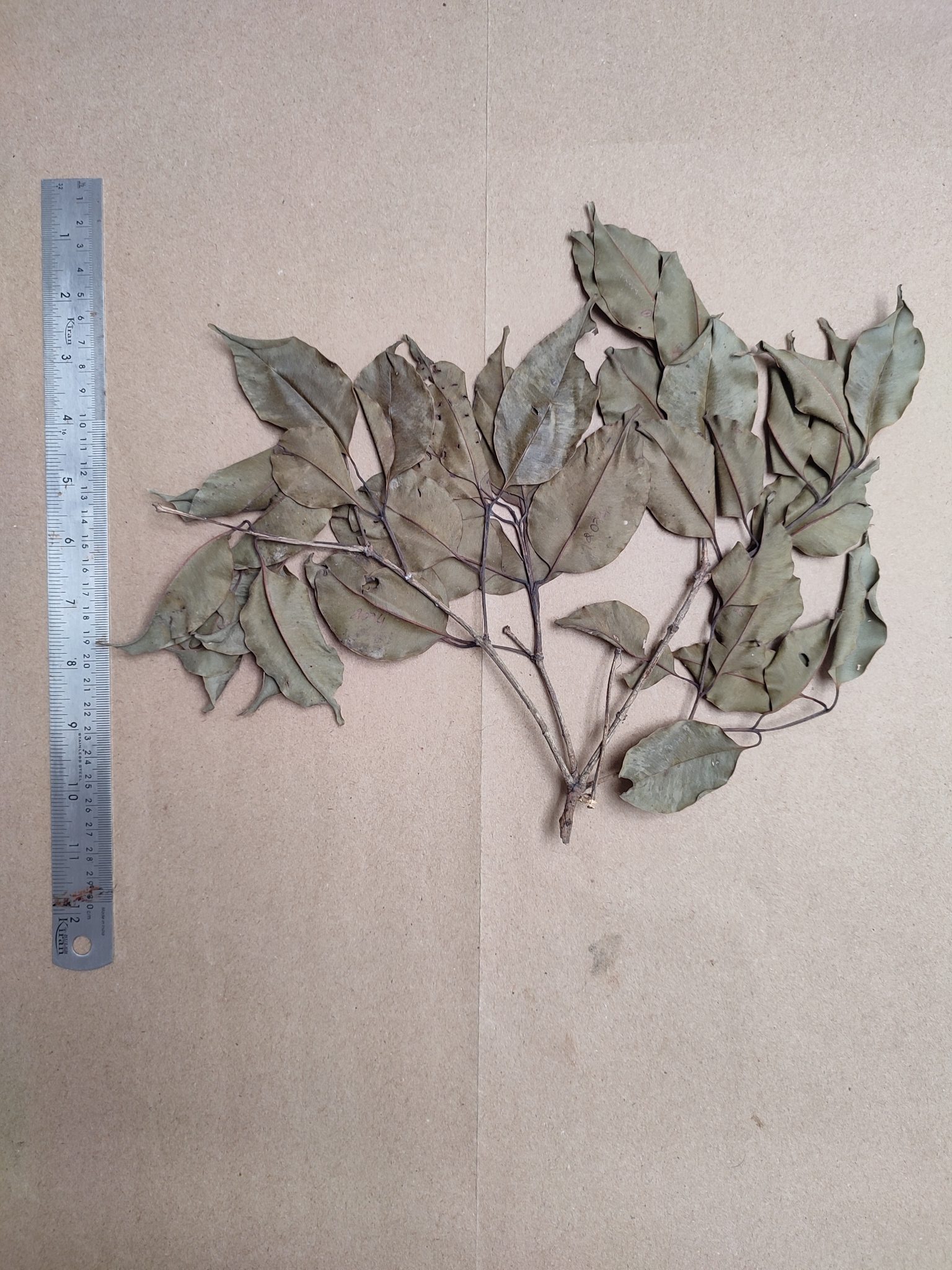
Herbarium specimen

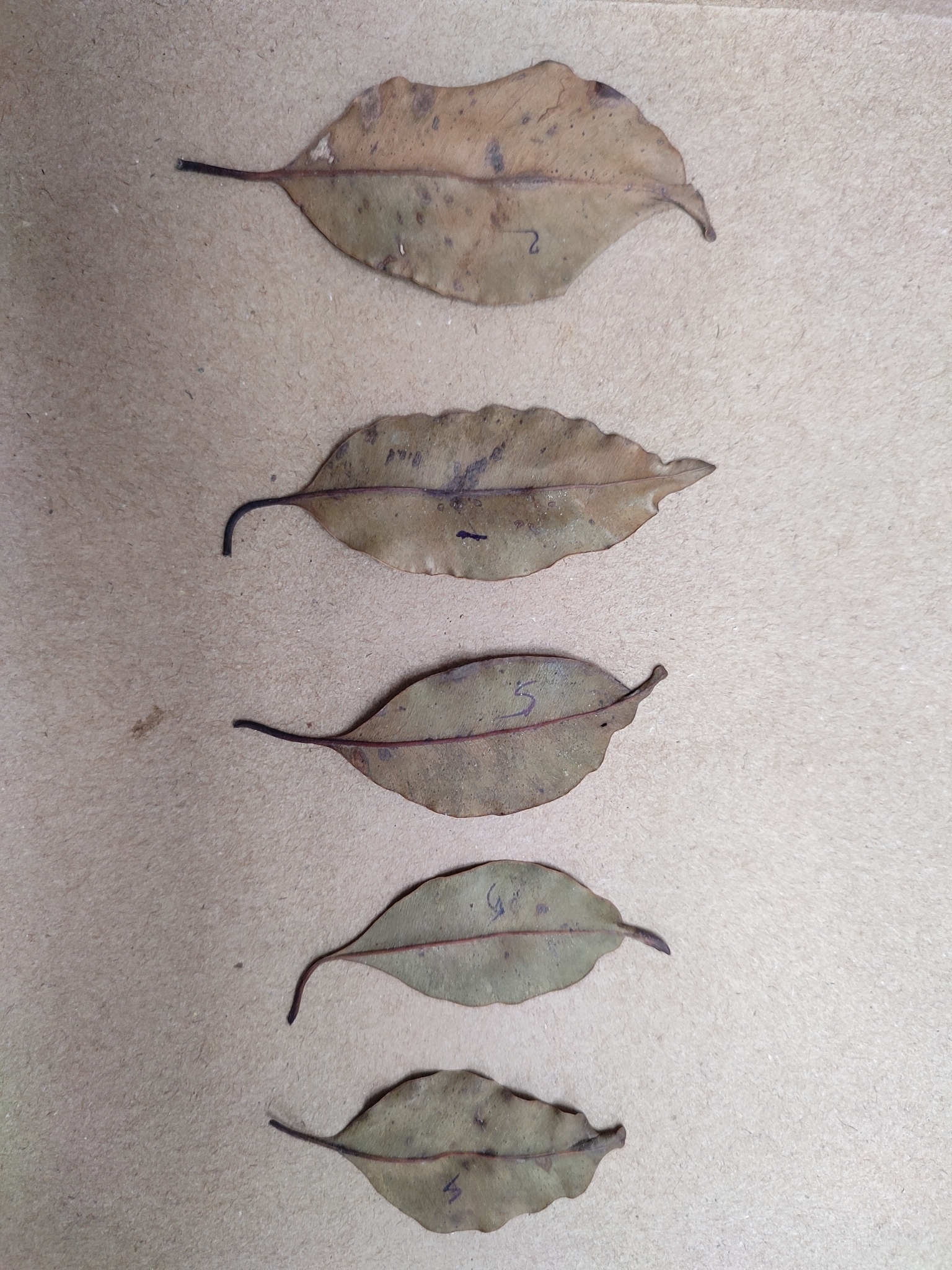
Dry leaves in herbarium
