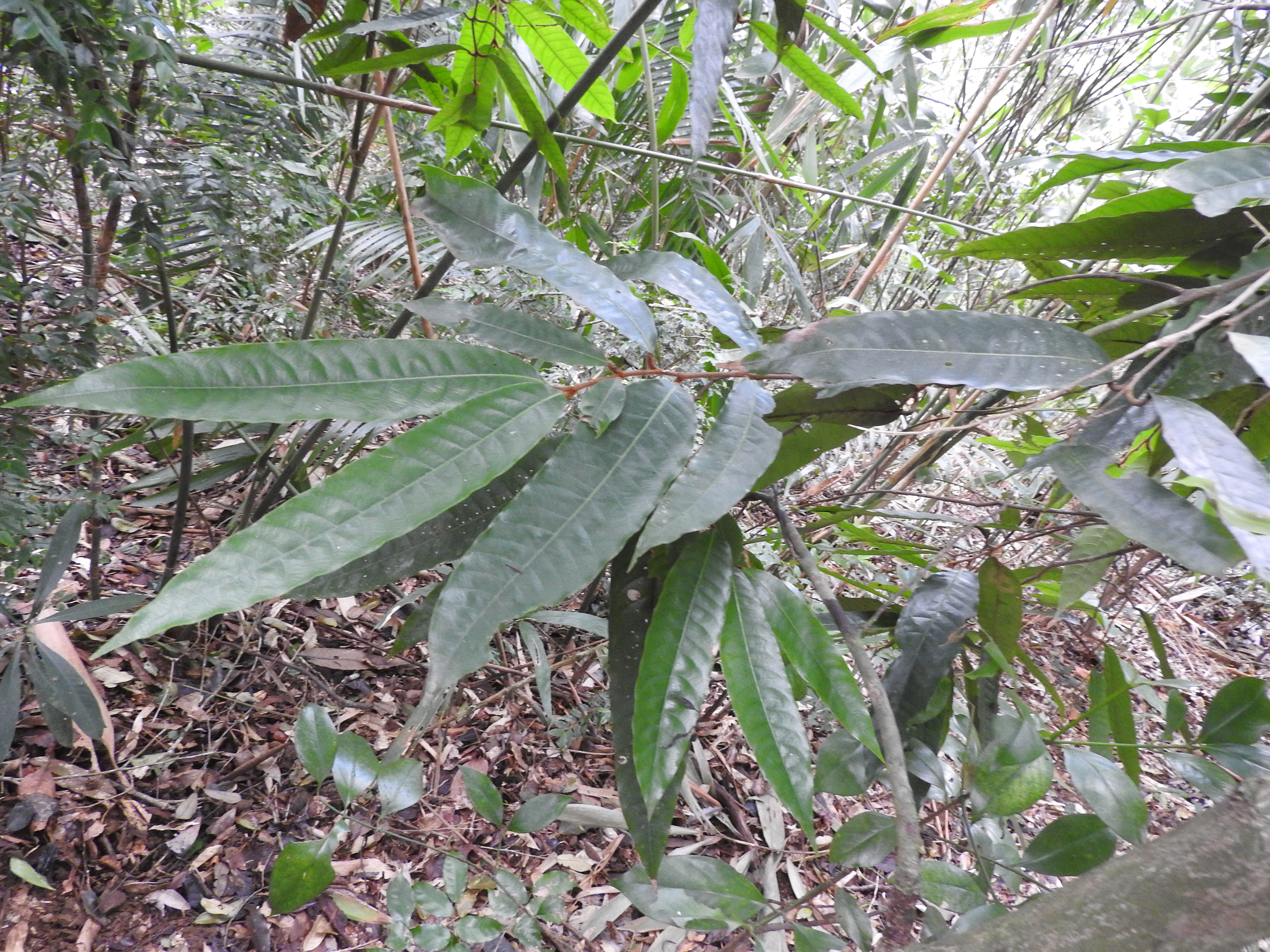

Conservation status
- Critically Endangered (IUCN 2.3)

Scientific classification
- Kingdom: Plantae
- Clade: Tracheophytes
- Clade: Angiosperms
- Clade: Eudicots
- Clade: Rosids
- Order: Sapindales
- Family: Anacardiaceae
- Genus: Nothopegia
- Species: N. aureo-fulva

Binomial name
- Nothopegia aureo-fulva Beddome ex Hook.f.

= Nothopegia aureo-fulva =

Species of flowering plant

Nothopegia aureo-fulva is a species of plant in the family Anacardiaceae. It was collected by Richard Henry Beddomi. It is endemic to the Thirunelveli Hills of Tamil Nadu, India. It is threatened by habitat loss.
