= Hopea glabra =

Conservation status
- Endangered (IUCN 3.1)

Scientific classification
- Kingdom: Plantae
- Clade: Tracheophytes
- Clade: Angiosperms
- Clade: Eudicots
- Clade: Rosids
- Order: Malvales
- Family: Dipterocarpaceae
- Genus: Hopea
- Species: H. glabra

Binomial name
- Hopea glabra Wight and Arn.

Synonyms
- Hopea wightiana var. glabra (Wight & Arn.) Bedd.

Species of tree

Hopea glabra is a species of flowering plant in the family Dipterocarpaceae. It is a tree native to Karnataka, Kerala, and Tamil Nadu in southwestern India. It grows up to 25 metres tall. It is native to the southern Western Ghats, with the northernmost occurrence in the Nilgiri Biosphere Reserve and the southernmost occurrence in the Agasthyamala Biosphere Reserve. It grows in mid-elevation evergreen and semi-evergreen rain forests, often in riverine areas, from 200 to 900 meters elevation.
