= Begonia trichocarpa =

Scientific classification
- Kingdom: Plantae
- Clade: Tracheophytes
- Clade: Angiosperms
- Clade: Eudicots
- Clade: Rosids
- Order: Cucurbitales
- Family: Begoniaceae
- Genus: Begonia
- Species: B. trichocarpa

Binomial name
- Begonia trichocarpa Dalzell

Species of flowering plant

Begonia trichocarpa, the hairy-fruit begonia, is a species of plant in the family Begoniaceae.

== Description ==
An annual, robust herb with reddish, flaccid to sub-erect stems densely covered with fine hairs. Leaves are ovate-oblong, 8 × 3 cm, long-acuminate, obliquely cordate at the base, membranous, and hairy, with 5 nerves arising from the base; petiole 1–3 cm long. Stipules are lanceolate. Inflorescences are lateral, cymose, about 2 cm across, borne on 1–2 cm long peduncles. Each cyme bears 1–3 flowers. Male flowers have four glabrous, hispid sepals, the inner pair smaller and curved. Female flowers have 4–5 sepals similar to those of the male flowers. The ovary is hairy, 3-locular with a single placenta; styles are three, each bifid at the apex. The capsule is obovate, 1 × 2 cm, with a flattened tip and acute wings. Seeds are extremely minute and hexagonal.
