= Syzygium benthamianum =

Conservation status
- Vulnerable (IUCN 3.1)

Scientific classification
- Kingdom: Plantae
- Clade: Tracheophytes
- Clade: Angiosperms
- Clade: Eudicots
- Clade: Rosids
- Order: Myrtales
- Family: Myrtaceae
- Genus: Syzygium
- Species: S. benthamianum

Binomial name
- Syzygium benthamianum (Duthie) Gamble

Synonyms
- Eugenia arnottiana var. benthamiana Duthie

Species of flowering plant

Syzygium benthamianum is a species of flowering plant in the family Myrtaceae. It is a shrub or tree endemic to southwestern India. It is native to the southern Western Ghats of Kerala and Tamil Nadu states, including the Nilgiris and Agastyamalai Hills, where it grows in montane rain forest.
