= Syzygium chavaran =

Conservation status
- Endangered (IUCN 2.3)

Scientific classification
- Kingdom: Plantae
- Clade: Tracheophytes
- Clade: Angiosperms
- Clade: Eudicots
- Clade: Rosids
- Order: Myrtales
- Family: Myrtaceae
- Genus: Syzygium
- Species: S. chavaran

Binomial name
- Syzygium chavaran (Bourd.) Gamble

Synonyms
- Eugenia chavaran Bourd.

Species of flowering plant

Syzygium chavaran is a species of plant in the family Myrtaceae. It is a tree endemic to southern Kerala to southern India, where it grows in lowland tropical moist forest near the coast.
