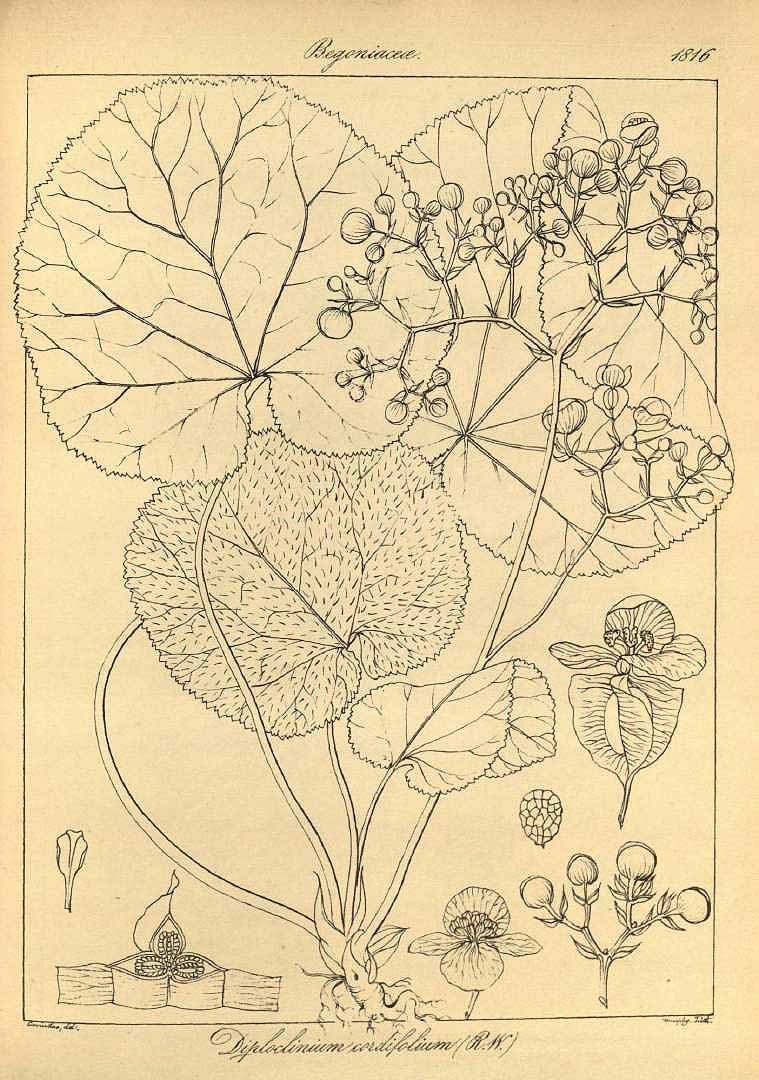

Scientific classification
- Kingdom: Plantae
- Clade: Tracheophytes
- Clade: Angiosperms
- Clade: Eudicots
- Clade: Rosids
- Order: Cucurbitales
- Family: Begoniaceae
- Genus: Begonia
- Species: B. cordifolia

Binomial name
- Begonia cordifolia (Wight) Thwaites

= Begonia cordifolia =

Species of flowering plant

Begonia cordifolia is a species of plant in the family Begoniaceae.

== Phenology ==
Flowering and fruiting : June-December

== Uses ==
Phytochemical screening of Begonia cordifolia leaves showed the presence of major bioactive compounds. Methanol extract had the highest extractive value, and the leaves contained high levels of phenols and flavonoids.
