= Polyzygus =

Scientific classification
- Kingdom: Plantae
- Clade: Tracheophytes
- Clade: Angiosperms
- Clade: Eudicots
- Clade: Asterids
- Order: Apiales
- Family: Apiaceae
- Genus: Polyzygus; Dalzell (1850)
- Species: P. tuberosus

Binomial name
- Polyzygus tuberosus Walp. (1852)

Synonyms
- Heracleum concanense var. stocksii C.B.Clarke (1879)

Genus of plants

Polyzygus is a monotypic genus of perennial plants belonging to the carrot family, Apiaceae. Its only species, Polyzygus tuberosus, is endemic to India.
