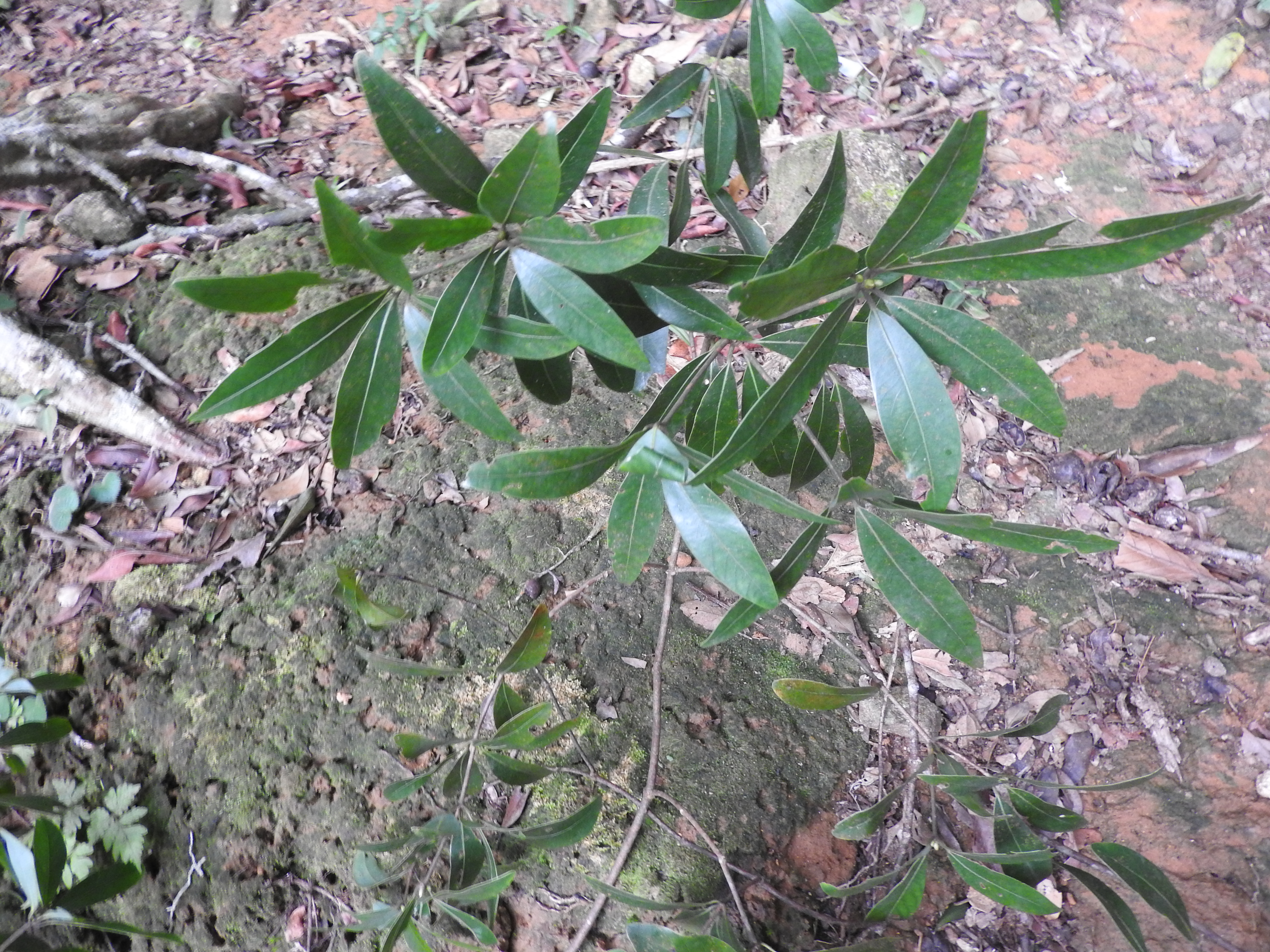

Conservation status
- Vulnerable (IUCN 3.1)

Scientific classification
- Kingdom: Plantae
- Clade: Tracheophytes
- Clade: Angiosperms
- Clade: Magnoliids
- Order: Laurales
- Family: Lauraceae
- Genus: Actinodaphne
- Species: A. campanulata

Binomial name
- Actinodaphne campanulata Hook.f.

Synonyms
- Iozoste campanulata (Hook.f.) Kuntze

= Actinodaphne campanulata =

Species of tree

Actinodaphne campanulata is an endangered tree native to the Western Ghats of southern India, found specifically in the Agasthyamalai Mountains at elevations of 1,000 to 1,300 metres. It is a critically threatened species due to habitat destruction from forest fires, cattle grazing, conversion of land for plantations, and logging for firewood. The species is distributed across several districts in Kerala and Tamil Nadu. Its native habitat is the wet tropical biome, where it flowers and fruits from February to June.
