= Syzygium palghatense =

Conservation status
- Critically Endangered (IUCN 3.1)

Scientific classification
- Kingdom: Plantae
- Clade: Tracheophytes
- Clade: Angiosperms
- Clade: Eudicots
- Clade: Rosids
- Order: Myrtales
- Family: Myrtaceae
- Genus: Syzygium
- Species: S. palghatense

Binomial name
- Syzygium palghatense Gamble

Species of flowering plant

Syzygium palghatense is a species of flowering plant in the family Myrtaceae. It is a small to medium-sized tree endemic to southern India. It is known from a single location at the northern end of the Anamalai portion of the Western Ghats, where it grows in submontane evergreen rain forest. The species epithet palghatense refers to Palghat District or Palghat Gap where the type specimen was found.

The species was first described by James Sykes Gamble in 1918.
