= Julostylis polyandra =

Conservation status
- Endangered (IUCN 2.3)

Scientific classification
- Kingdom: Plantae
- Clade: Tracheophytes
- Clade: Angiosperms
- Clade: Eudicots
- Clade: Rosids
- Order: Malvales
- Family: Malvaceae
- Genus: Julostylis
- Species: J. polyandra

Binomial name
- Julostylis polyandra Ravi & Anil Kumar

Species of flowering plant

Julostylis polyandra is a species of flowering plant in the family Malvaceae. It is native to India, where it is confined to Kerala.
