= Nilgiri Biosphere Reserve =

International biosphere reserve of India

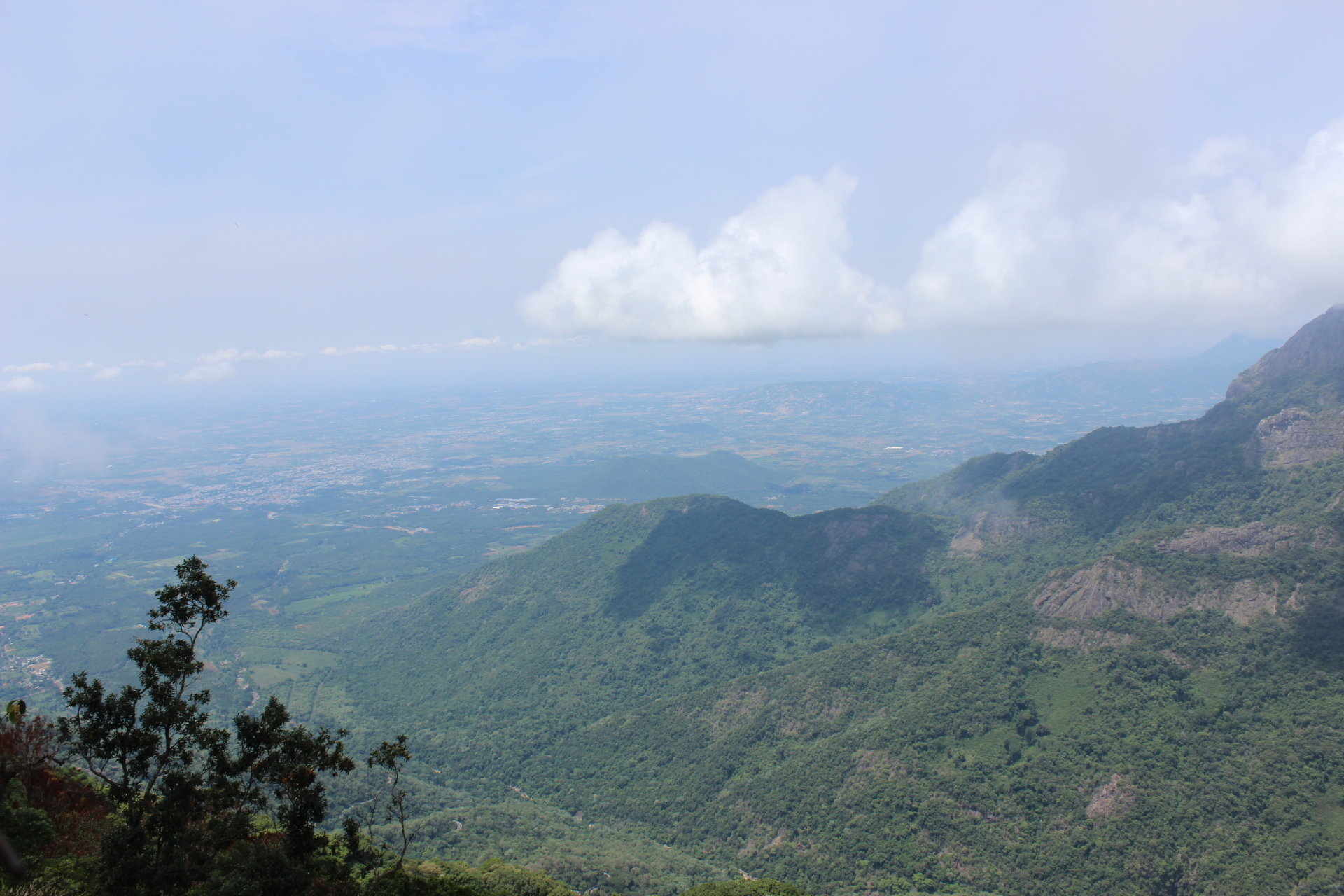
- Nilgiri Hills from the top of Doddabetta Peak

- Location within Tamil Nadu Location within Kerala Location within India

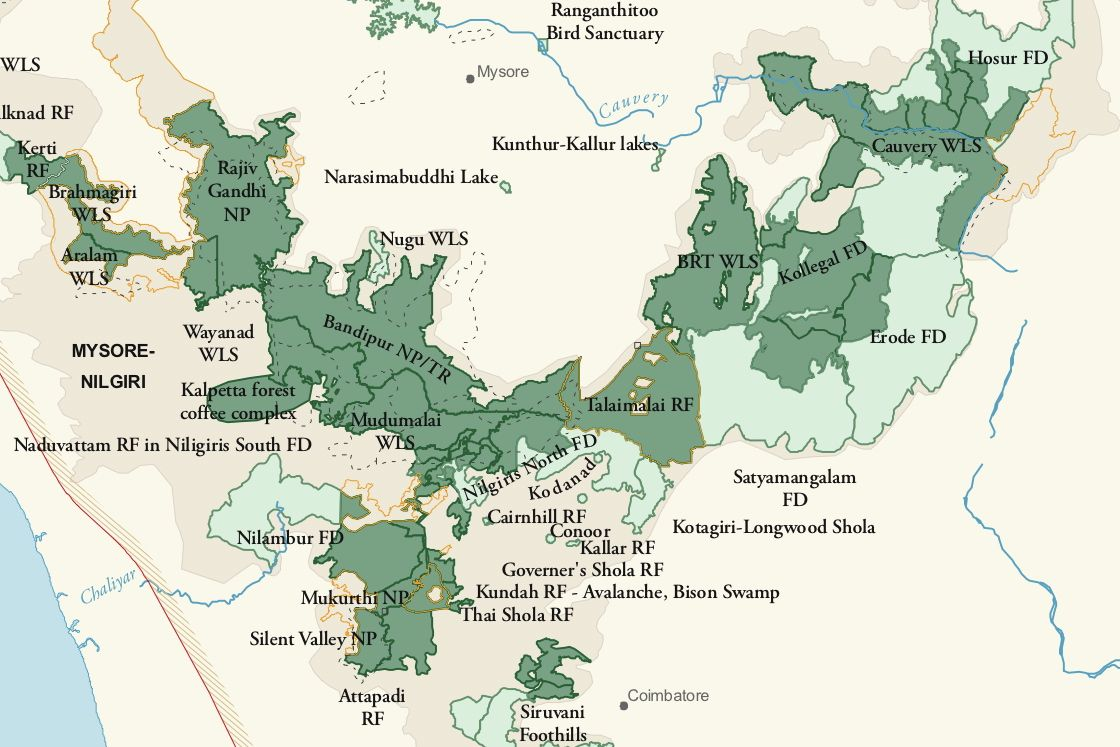
- Location: South India
- Coordinates: 11°33′00″N 76°37′30″E
- Area: 5,520 km^{2} (2,130 sq mi)
- Established: 1986
- Governing body: Tamilnadu forest department, Karnataka forest department, Kerala forest department, Project Tiger
- Website: www.nbnaturepark.com

Logo of the Nilgiri Biosphere Reserve

Nilgiri Biosphere Reserve is a biosphere reserve in the Nilgiri Mountains of the Western Ghats in South India covering an area of 5,520 km^{2} (2,130 sq mi) that was nominated in September 2000 under UNESCO's Man and Biosphere Programme. It is the largest protected forest area in India, spreading across Tamil Nadu, Karnataka and Kerala. It includes the protected areas Mudumalai National Park, Mukurthi National Park, Sathyamangalam Wildlife Sanctuary in Tamil Nadu; Nagarhole National Park, Bandipur National Park, both in Karnataka; Silent Valley National Park, Aralam Wildlife Sanctuary, Wayanad Wildlife Sanctuary, and Karimpuzha Wildlife Sanctuary in Kerala. It is India's first and foremost biosphere reserves with a rich heritage of flora and fauna. Tribal groups such as the Toda, Kotas, Irulla, Kurumba, Paniya, Adiyan, Edanadan Chettis, Allar, and Malayan live in the reserve.

== Etymology ==
The word Nilgiri is derived from the Tamil word neelam meaning blue and the Sanskrit word giri meaning mountain. It is thought that the bluish flowers of kurinji shrubs gave rise to the name.

== History ==
In the 1970s, an area of around 5,670 km^{2} (2,190 sq mi) in the Nilgiri Mountains was proposed to be included in the list of the biosphere reserves of India. This proposed area encompassed a forestry zone of 2,290 km^{2} (880 sq mi), a core zone of 2,020 km^{2} (780 sq mi), an agricultural zone of 1,330 km^{2} (510 sq mi), and a restoration zone of 30 km^{2} (12 sq mi). Nilgiri Biosphere Reserve was established in September 1986 and is India's first biosphere reserve under UNESCO's Man and the Biosphere Programme.

== Geography ==
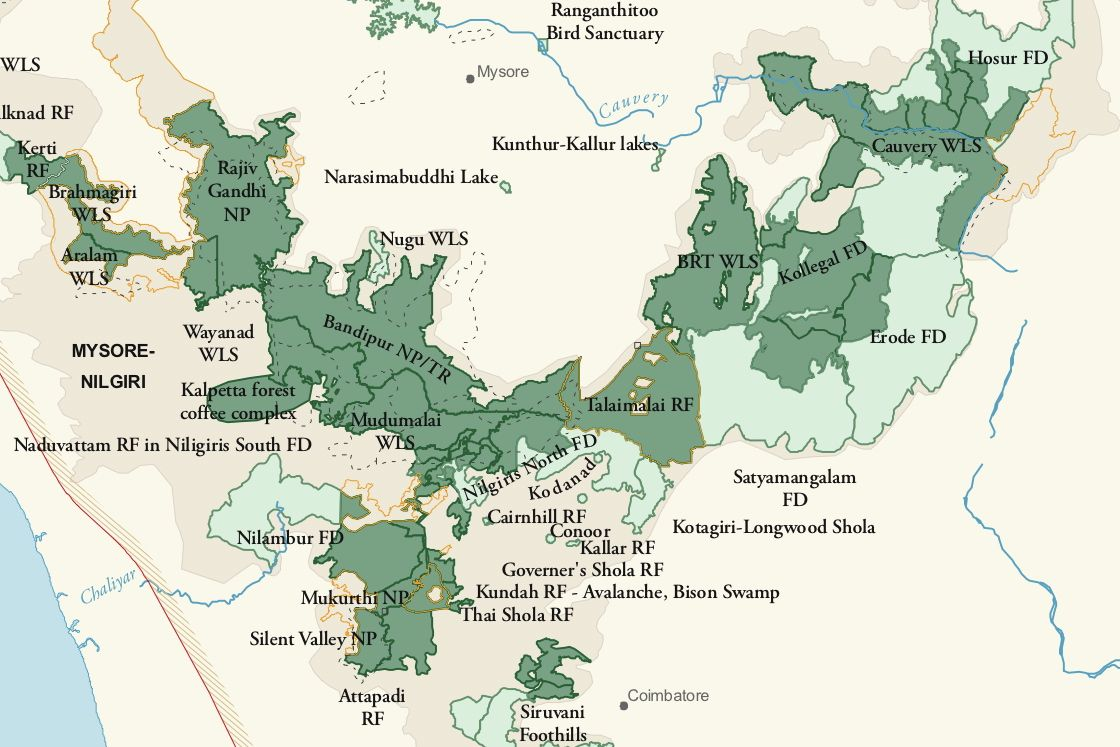
Map of Nilgiri Biosphere Reserve

Nilgiri Biosphere Reserve extends over an area of 5,520 km^{2} (2,130 sq mi) from the eastern part of Kodagu District to Erode District in the east and to the Palakkad Gap in the south with an elevation of 80 to 2,600 m (260 to 8,530 ft). It has a buffer zone of 4,280 km^{2} (1,650 sq mi) and core areas of 1,250.3 km^{2} (482.7 sq mi), comprising 701.8 km^{2} (271.0 sq mi) in Karnataka, 264.5 km^{2} (102.1 sq mi) in Kerala and 274 km^{2} (106 sq mi) in Tamil Nadu.

The reserve extends from the tropical and subtropical moist broadleaf forests, tropical moist forests of the western slopes of the Ghats to the tropical and subtropical dry broadleaf forests tropical dry forests on the east slopes. The rainfall range is 500–7,000 mm (20–276 in) per year. The reserve encompasses three ecoregions, the South Western Ghats moist deciduous forests, South Western Ghats montane rain forests, and South Deccan Plateau dry deciduous forests.

== Flora ==
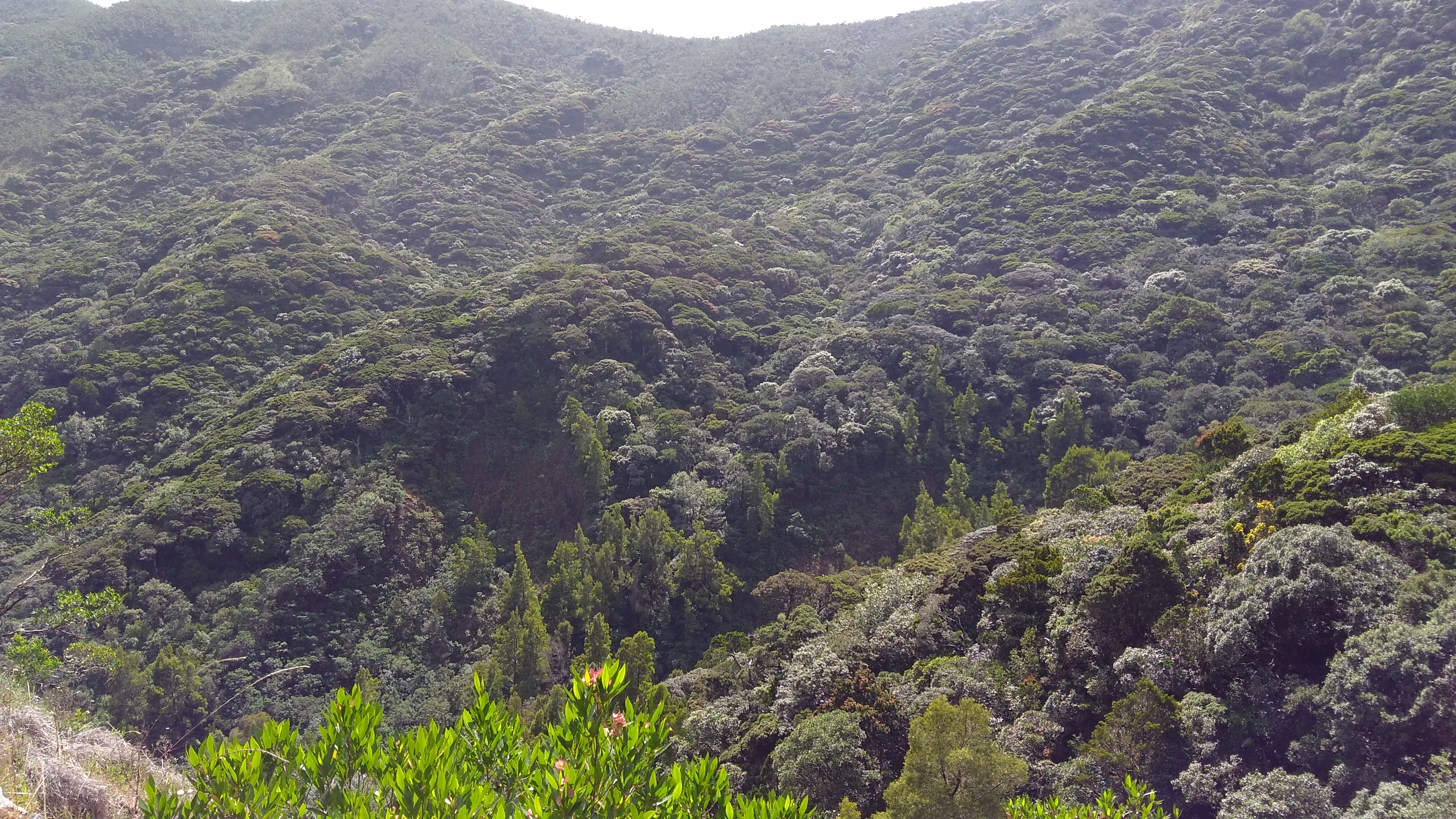
Shola forest in the Nilgiri Hills

Nilgiri Biosphere Reserve harbours more than 3,700 plant species, including about 200 medicinal plants; the 132 endemic flowering plants are contained in the list of endemic plants in the Nilgiri Biosphere Reserve. Stunted evergreen trees grow in shola forest patches above 1,800 m (5,900 ft) and are festooned with epiphytes.

Tall trees above a height of 18 m (59 ft) are used by the giant honey bees (Apis dorsata) for building nests, including the species Tetrameles nudiflora, Indian laurel (Ficus microcarpa), Coromandel ebony (Diospyros melanoxylon), yellow snake tree (Stereospermum tetragonum), rusty kamala (Mallotus tetracoccus) and Acrocarpus fraxinifolius. During the peak flowering season from January to May, at least 73 species blossom including teak (Tectona grandis), red cedar (Erythroxylum monogynum), hiptage (Hiptage benghalensis), large-flowered bay tree (Persea macrantha), zunna berry (Ziziphus rugosa) and creeping smartweed (Persicaria chinensis). They depend on pollination by giant honey bee, Asiatic honey bee (Apis cerana), red dwarf honey bee (A. florea) and Trigona bees.

== Fauna ==
=== Birds ===
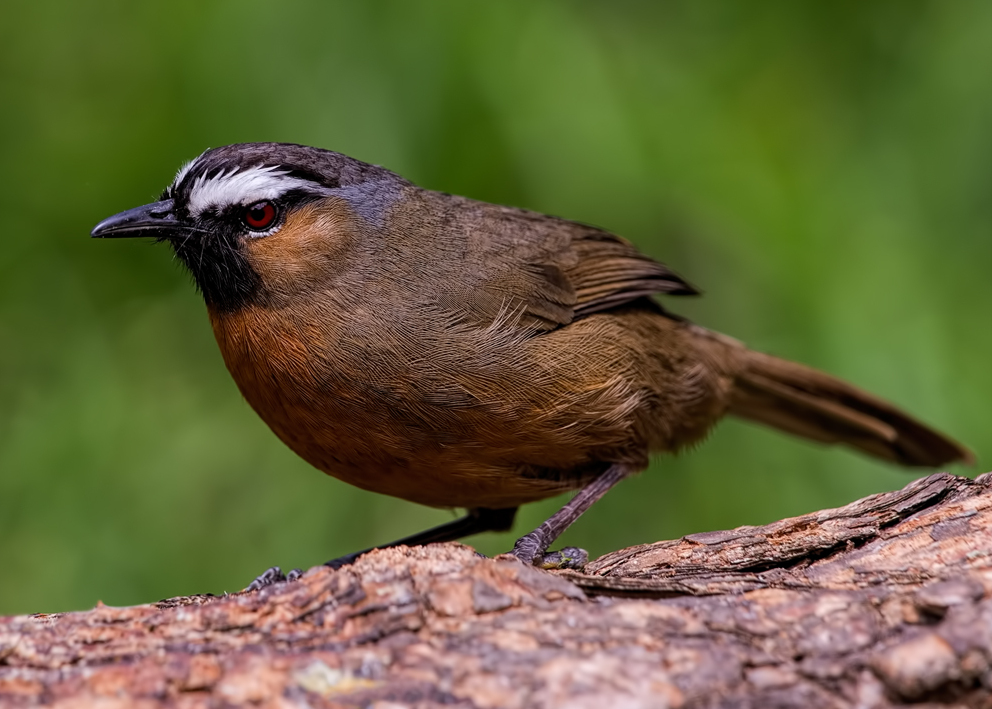
Nilgiri laughingthrush

Nilgiri Biosphere Reserve harbours 14 bird species that are endemic to the Western Ghats. Of these, the Nilgiri laughingthrush (Strophocincla cachinnans) inhabits only higher elevations above 1,200 m (3,900 ft). Other endemics and near-endemics include Nilgiri wood-pigeon, Malabar grey hornbill, Malabar parakeet, white-bellied treepie, white-bellied shortwing, grey-headed bulbul, grey-breasted laughingthrush, rufous babbler, black-and-rufous flycatcher, Nilgiri flycatcher, and Nilgiri pipit.

=== Mammals ===
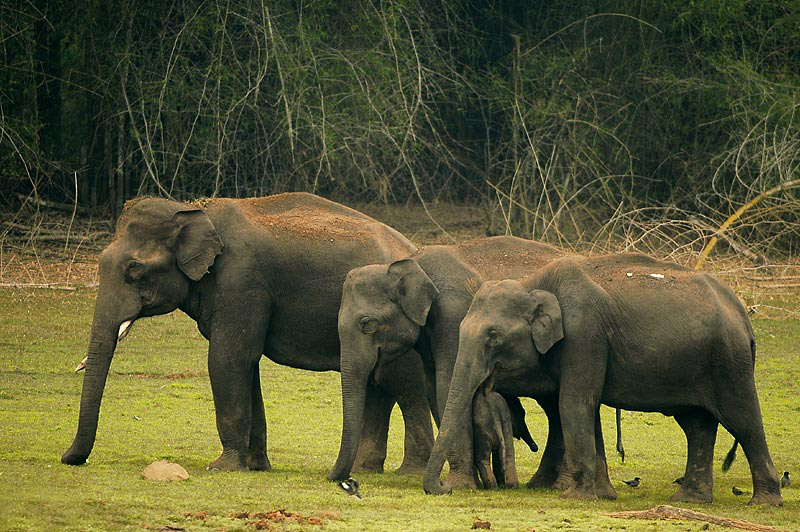
Asian elephants at the Kabini River

Nilgiri Biosphere Reserve and adjacent areas host the largest Asian elephant (Elephas maximus) population in India, estimated at 5,750 individuals by 2007. Herds move in 562–800 km^{2} (217–309 sq mi) large home ranges and congregate at perennial water sources during the dry season.

Fauna includes over 100 species of mammals, 370 species of birds, 80 species of reptiles, about 39 species of fish, 31 amphibians and 316 species of butterflies. It is home to mammals such as the Bengal tiger, Indian leopard, chital deer, gaur, sambar deer, dhole, golden jackal, Indian boar, Nilgiri tahr, Indian spotted chevrotain, black buck, Asian palm civet, sloth bear, four-horned antelope, Nilgiri marten, Indian crested porcupine, Malabar giant squirrel, honey badger, Indian grey mongoose, Indian pangolin, Indian fox, smooth coated otter, and painted bat. Primates include the lion tailed macaque, Nilgiri langur, gray langur and bonnet macaque.

=== Amphibians and reptiles ===
Amphibians include purple frog, Silent valley brush frog, Malabar gliding frog, Beddomixalus. Around fifty percent of India's amphibian species are endemic to the region, and around ninety species of reptiles including the genera Brachyopihidium, Dravidogecko, Melanophidum, Ristella, Salea, Plectrurus, Teretrurus, and Xylophis.

== Threats ==
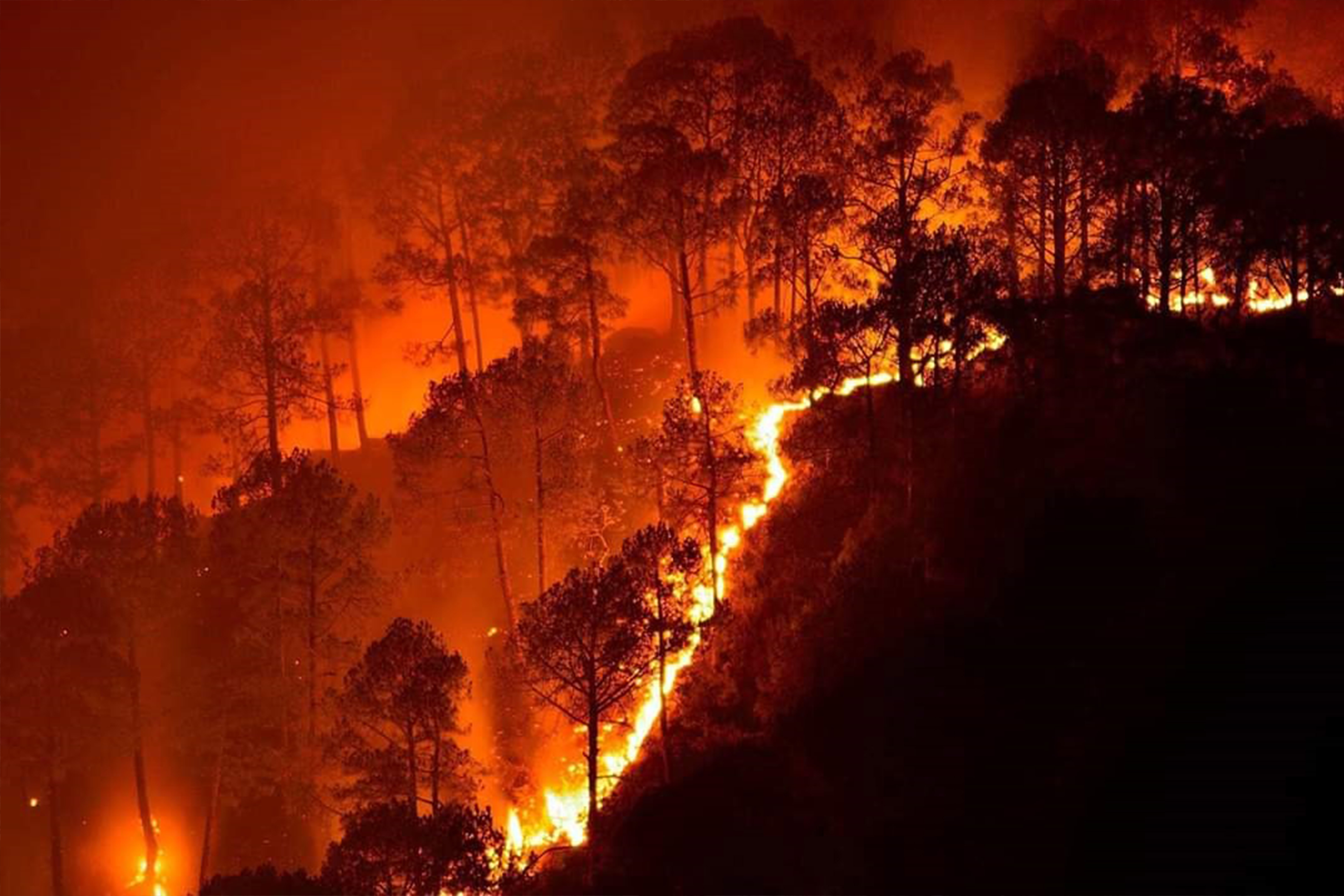
Forest fire in Bandipur National Park in 2019

Shola forests outside protected areas are threatened by fragmentation, especially in the vicinity of settlements. The rapid and dense growth of the invasive Passiflora mollissima inhibits the regeneration of native tree species in the Shola forest patches.

Poaching, deforestation, forest fires, and dangers to native tribes are the main threats. Despite poaching banned by law in 1972, people still tend to illegally hunt animals such as tigers, elephants, and chital for skin, fur or tusks.

== See also ==
- Indian Council of Forestry Research and Education
- Nilgiris - A Shared Wilderness
