= Silent Valley National Park =

National park in Kerala, India

- Malayalam: സൈലന്‍റ് വാലീ നാഷണല്‍ പാര്‍ക്ക്
- IUCN category II (national park)
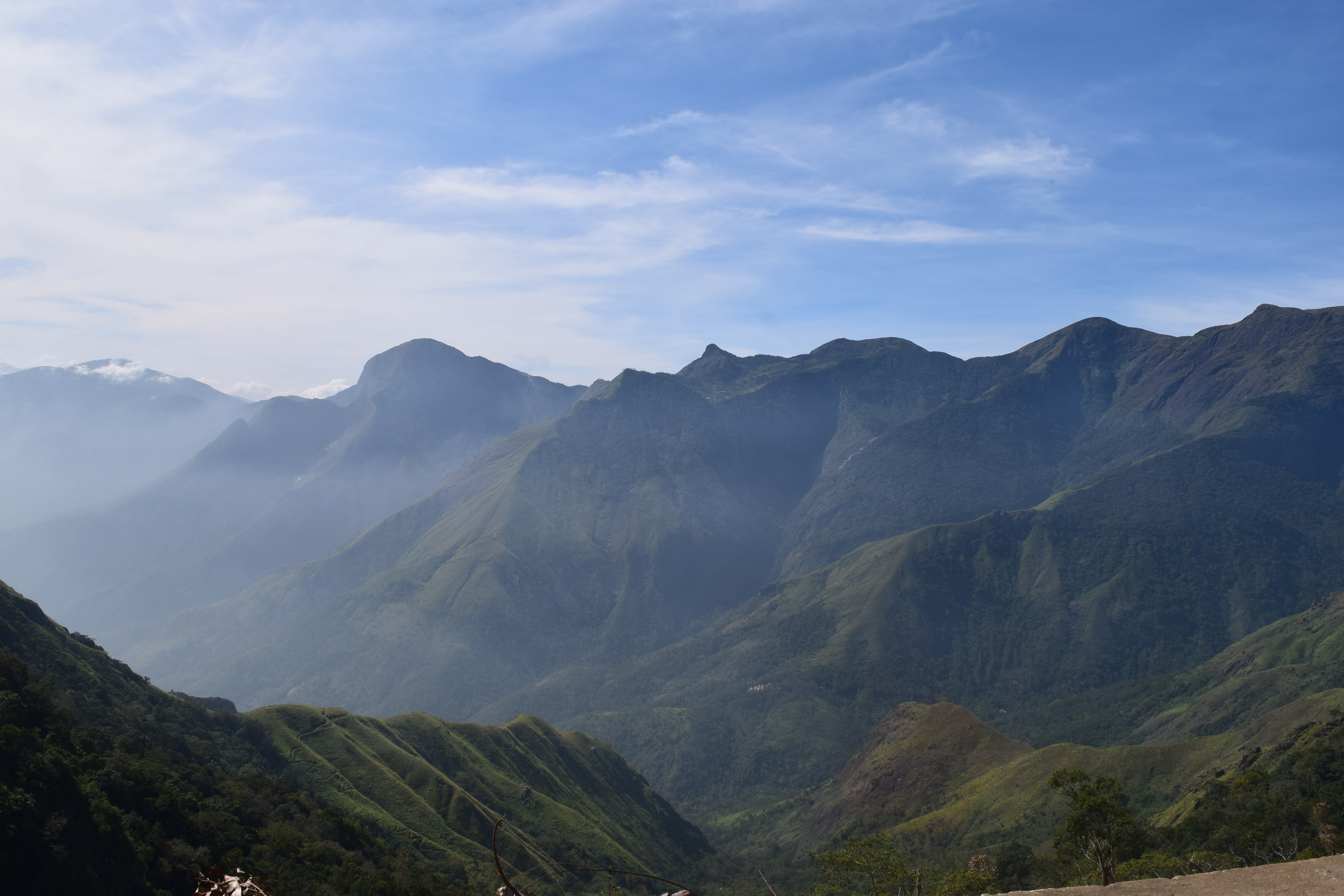
- The Nilgiri Mountains as seen from Silent Valley National Park

- Location within Kerala
- Interactive map of Silent Valley National Park
- Location: Kerala
- Nearest city: Mannarkkad
- Coordinates: 11°08′N 76°28′E
- Area: 89.52 km^{2} (34.56 sq mi)
- Established: 26 December 1984
- Governing body: Department of Forests and Wildlife (Kerala)

Silent Valley National Park is a national park in Kerala, India. It is located in the Nilgiri hills and has a core area of 89.52 km^{2} (34.56 sq mi). It is surrounded by a buffer zone of 148 km^{2} (57 sq mi). This national park has some rare species of flora and fauna. Silent Valley National Park was explored in 1847 by the botanist Robert Wight. It is located in the border of Mannarkkad Taluk of Palakkad district, Nilambur Taluk of Malappuram district, Kerala, and Nilgiris district of Tamil Nadu.

It is located in the rich biodiversity of Nilgiri Biosphere Reserve. The Karimpuzha Wildlife Sanctuary, New Amarambalam Reserved Forest, Nedumkayam Rainforest in Nilambur Taluk of Malappuram district, Attappadi Reserved Forest in Mannarkkad Taluk of Palakkad district, and Mukurthi National Park of Nilgiris district are located around Silent Valley National Park. Mukurthi peak, the fifth-highest peak in South India, and Anginda peak are also located in its vicinity. The Bhavani River, a tributary of the Kaveri River, and Kunthipuzha River, a tributary of Bharathappuzha river, originate in the vicinity of Silent Valley. The Kadalundi River also originates in Silent Valley National Park.

The national park is one of the last undisturbed tracts of South Western Ghats mountain rain forests and tropical moist evergreen forest in India. Contiguous with the proposed Karimpuzha National Park (225 km^{2} (87 sq mi)) to the north and Mukurthi National Park (78.46 km^{2}) to the north-east, it is the core of the Nilgiri Biosphere Reserve (1,455.4 km^{2}), and is part of the Nilgiri Sub-Cluster (6,000^{+} km^{2}), Western Ghats World Heritage Site, recognised by UNESCO in 2007.

Plans for a hydroelectric project that threatened the park's biodiversity stimulated an environmentalist social movement in the 1970s, known as the Save Silent Valley movement, which resulted in cancelling the project and creating the park in 1980. The visitors' centre for the park is at Sairandhri.

== History ==
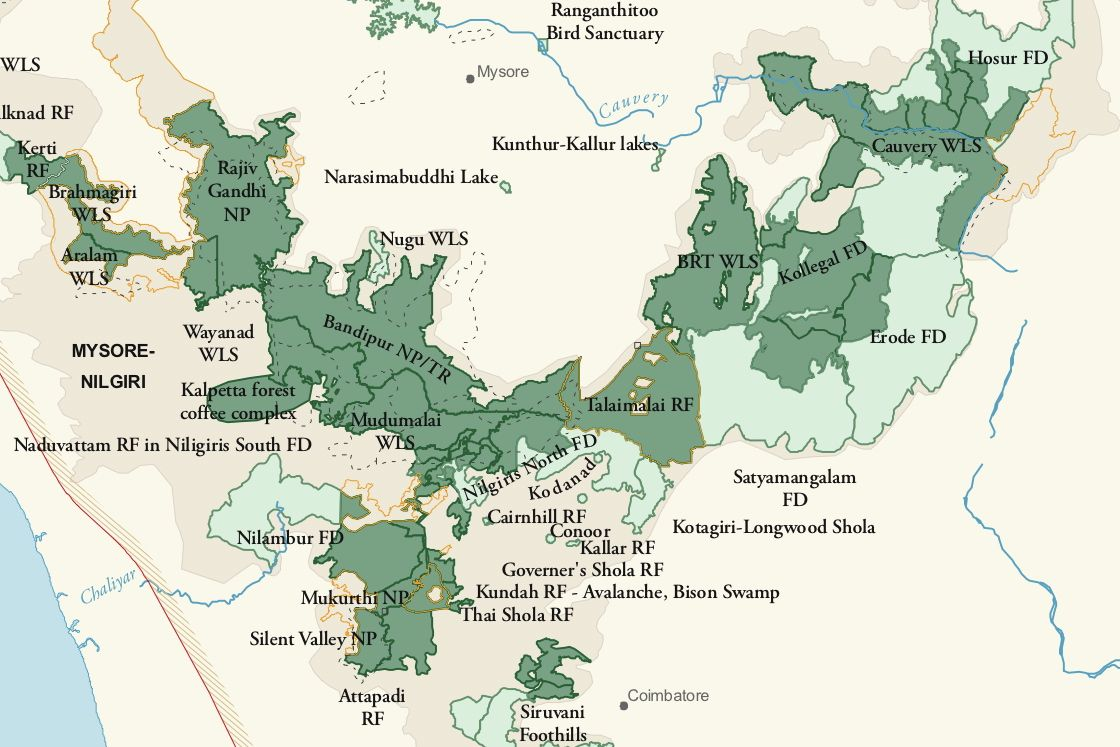
Map of Nilgiris Biosphere Reserve, showing Silent Valley National Park in relation to multiple contiguous protected areas

The first Western investigation of the watersheds of the Silent Valley area was in 1857 by the botanist Robert Wight. The British named the area Silent Valley because of a perceived absence of noisy cicadas. Another story attributes the name to the anglicisation of Sairandhri. A third story refers to the presence of many lion-tailed macaques Macaca silenus. In 1914, the forest of the Silent Valley area was declared a reserve forest. Between 1927 and 1976, portions of the Silent Valley forest area were subjected to forestry operations. In 1928, the location on the Kunthipuzha River at Sairandhri was identified as an ideal site for electricity generation, and in 1958 a study and survey of the area was conducted and a hydroelectric project of 120 MV costing Rs. 17 crore was proposed by the Kerala State Electricity Board.

== Environmental concerns ==
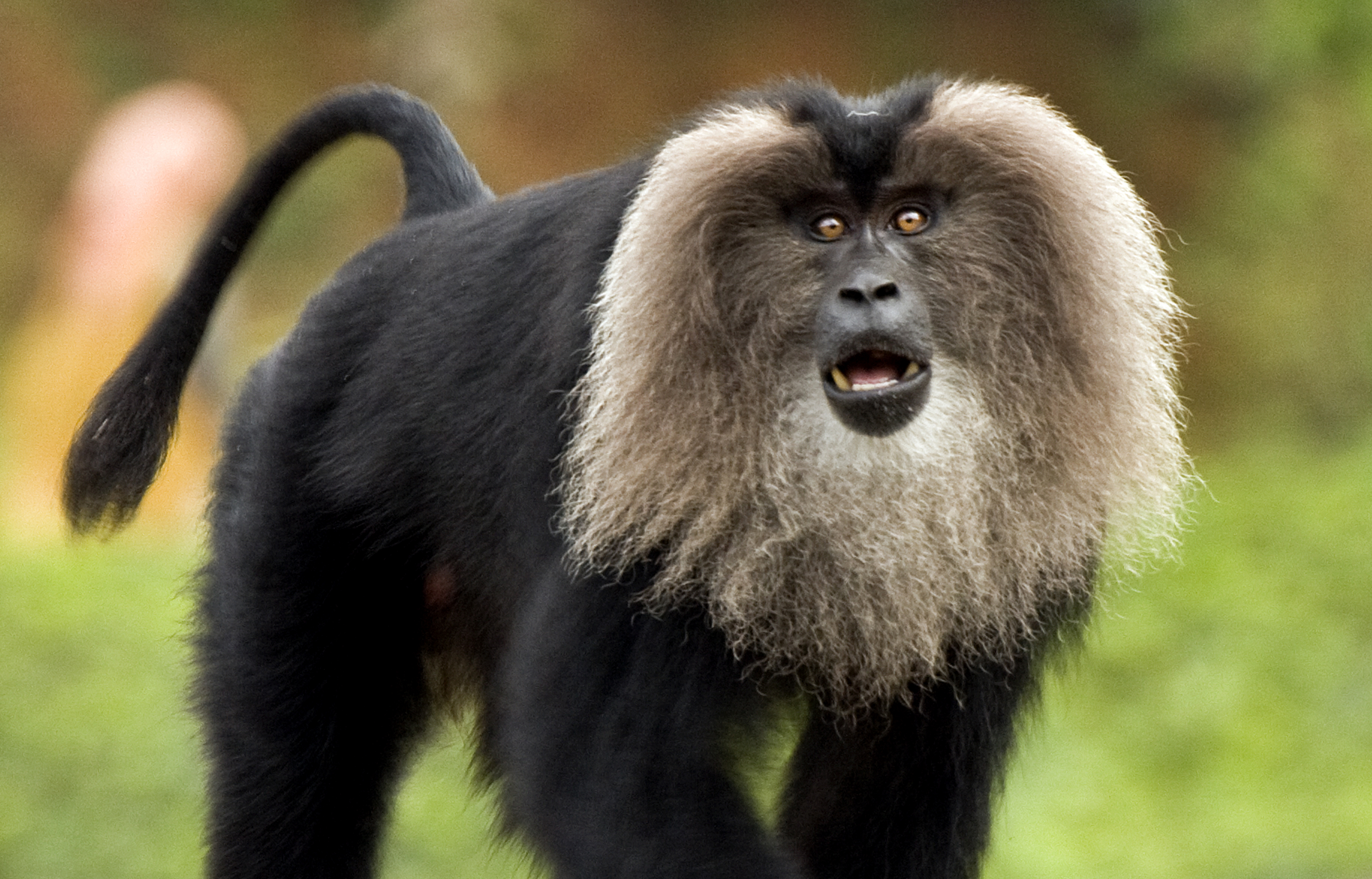
Lion-tailed macaque

Silent Valley is home to the largest population of lion-tailed macaques, an endangered species of primate. Public concern over threats to their habitat led to the establishment of Silent Valley National Park.

In 1973, the valley became the focus of "Save Silent Valley", India's fiercest environmental movement of the decade, when the Kerala State Electricity Board decided to implement the Silent Valley Hydro-Electric Project (SVHEP), centered on a dam across the Kunthipuzha River. The resulting reservoir would flood 8.3 km^{2} of virgin rainforest and threaten the lion-tailed macaque. In 1976, the Kerala State Electricity Board announced plans to begin dam construction and the issue was brought, to public attention. Romulus Whitaker, founder of the Madras Snake Park and the Madras Crocodile Bank, was probably the first person to draw public attention to the small and remote area.

On 7 September 1985 the Silent Valley National Park was formally inaugurated and a memorial at Sairandhri to Indira Gandhi was unveiled by Rajiv Gandhi, her son and the next prime minister. On 1 September 1986 Silent Valley National Park was designated as the core area of the Nilgiri Biosphere Reserve. Since then, a long-term conservation effort has been undertaken to preserve the Silent Valley ecosystem.

In 2001 a new hydro project was proposed and the "Man vs. Monkey debate" was revived. The proposed site of the dam (64.5 m high and 275 m long) is just 3.5 km downstream of the old dam site at Sairandhiri, 500 m outside the National Park boundary. The Kerala Minister for Electricity called The Pathrakkadavu dam (PHEP) an "eco-friendly alternative" to the old Silent Valley project. The claim was that the submergence area of the PHEP would be a negligible .041 km^{2} compared to 8.30 km^{2} submergence of the 1970s (SVHEP). From January to May 2003, a rapid Environmental Impact Assessment (EIA) was carried out. On 15 November, Minister for Forest Binoy Viswam said that the proposed buffer zone for Silent Valley would be declared soon.

On 21 February 2007 ex-Chief Minister A. K. Antony told reporters after a cabinet meeting that "when the Silent Valley proposal was dropped, the centre had promised to give clearance to the Pooyamkutty project. This promise, however, had not been honoured. The Kerala government has not taken any decision on reviving the Silent Valley Hydel Project".

On 18 April 2007, Kerala Chief Minister V S Achuthanandan and his cabinet approved the Pathrakkadavu Hydro-electric project and sent it to the Union Government for environmental approval.

Map of Silent Valley NP

=== Buffer zone ===
Territorial forests located around the national park have been subject to a working-plan to accomplish revenue oriented objectives such as extraction of bamboo and reed which affect the long-term conservation of the park. In addition, illegal activities such as ganja (Cannabis sativa) cultivation has caused habitat degradation.

On 21 November 2009, Union Minister of Forest and Environment Jairam Ramesh and Kerala Forest Minister Binoy Viswam declared, while inaugurating the silver jubilee celebration of Silent Valley National Park in Palakkad, that the buffer zone of the Park would be made an integral part of it in order to ensure better protection of the area.

On 6 June 2007 the Kerala cabinet approved the buffer zone proposal. The new 147.22 km^{2} zone will include 80.75 km^{2} taken from Attapady Forest Range, 27.09 km^{2} from Mannarkkad Forest Range and 39.38 km^{2} from Kalikavu Forest Range and consolidated to form a new range, Bhavani Forest Range, of 94 km^{2} and 54 km^{2} would be brought under the existing Silent Valley Range of the National Park. The Cabinet also sanctioned 35 staff to protect the area and two new forest stations in Bhavani range at Anavai and Thudukki. Forest Minister Benoy Viswom said "the zone would have reserve forest status and tribals in the area would not be affected. The decision reaffirmed the commitment of the LDF Government to protection of environment. The zone is a necessity, not just of the State but also of the nation."

The proposal was then sent to Kerala Minister for Electricity, A. K. Balan, who has voiced the need for setting up the Pathrakadavu hydroelectric project in the proposed southwest buffer zone of the National Park, the Thenkara Range of the Mannarkkad Forest Division. As of 9 May 2007 Balan has not given his opinion on the buffer zone proposal.

In August 2006, the new Minister for Forests, Benoy Viswam, approved a proposal from the Conservator of Forests for a 148 km^{2} buffer zone around the core area of the park. The proposal says: "It is felt absolutely essential that an effective buffer of forests should be immediately formed around the national park in order to save the world famous Silent Valley National Park from all potential dangers. This can only be achieved by bringing the management of Silent Valley National Park as well as the proposed buffer zone under one management umbrella to insulate the park from all possible dangers." The proposed buffer zone will have 94 km^{2} in Attappady Reserve Forest east of the Kunthipuzha and 54 km^{2} taken from the Mannarkaad range and Nilambur south division west of the river.

In January 2006, the former Kerala Minister for Forest and Environment, A. Sujanapal, said the Government would consider the demand for a 600 km^{2} buffer zone for Silent Valley National Park made by Bharathapuzha Protection Committee, Malampuzha Protection Committee, One Earth One Life and Jana Jagratha. A buffer zone proposal was made in the 1986 park management plan but not implemented.

In 1979, M.S. Swaminathan, then Secretary to the Department of Agriculture, visited the Silent Valley area and suggested that 389.52 km^{2} including the Silent Valley (89.52 km^{2}), New Amarambalam (80 km^{2}), Attappadi (120 km^{2}) in Kerala and Kunda in Coimbatore (100 km^{2}) reserve forests, should be developed into a National Rainforest Biosphere Reserve.

On 27 October 2020 draft notification was made by Govt. of India for the area around the National park declaring it as eco sensitive zone.

== Geography ==
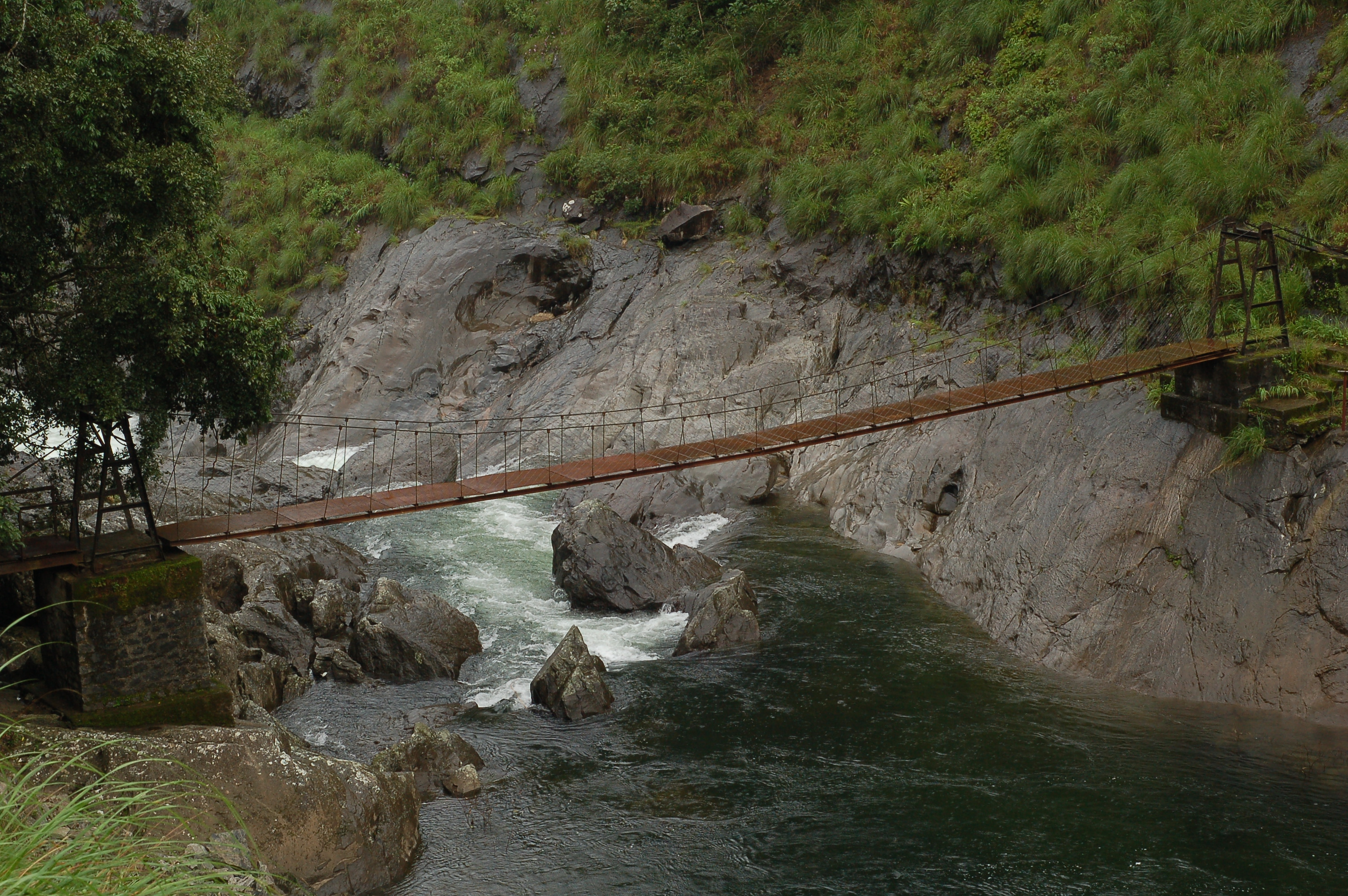
Hanging Bridge across the Kuntipuzha River – Silent Valley National Park (SVNP)

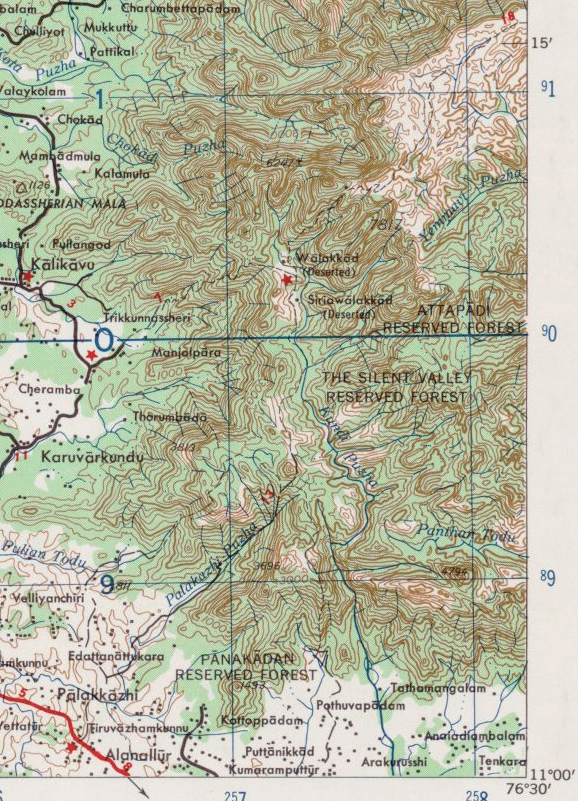
Silent Valley National Park Topography 1:250,000., 1959'.

Silent Valley is rectangular, twelve kilometres from north to south and seven from east to west. Located between 11°03' to 11°13' N (latitude) and 76°21' to 76°35' E (longitude) it is separated from the eastern and northern high altitude plateaus of the (Nilgiris Mountains) by high continuous ridges including Sispara Peak (2,206 m) at the north end of the park. The park gradually slopes southward down to the Palakkad plains and to the west it is bounded by irregular ridges. The altitude varies from 658 m to 2328 m at Anginda Peak, but most of the park lies within the altitude range of 880 m to 1200 m. Soils are blackish and slightly acidic in evergreen forests where there is good accumulation of organic matter. The underlying rock in the area is granite with schists and gneiss, which give rise to the loamy laterite soils on slopes.

=== Rivers ===
The Kunthipuzha River drains the entire 15 km length of the park from north to south into the Bharathapuzha River. Kunthipuzha River divides the park into a narrow eastern sector of width 2 kilometers and a wide western sector of 5 kilometers. The river is characterized by its crystal clear water and perennial nature. The main tributaries of the river, Kunthancholapuzha, Karingathodu, Madrimaranthodu, Valiaparathodu and Kummaathanthodu originate on the upper slopes of the eastern side of the valley. The river is uniformly shallow, with no flood plains or meanders. Its bed falls from 1,861 m to 900 m over a distance of 12 km, the last 8 km being particularly level with a fall of only 60 m. Kunthipuzha is one of the less torrential rivers of the Western Ghats, with a pesticide-free catchment area.

=== Climate ===
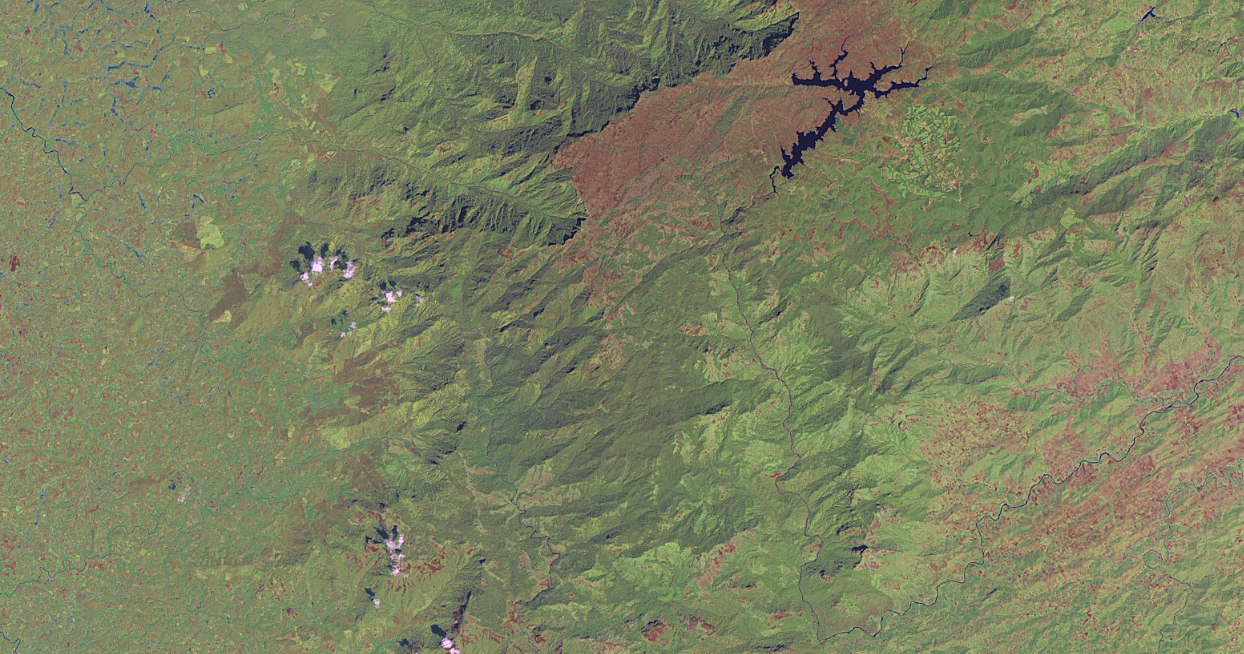
Silent Valley from JPL Map server.

Silent Valley gets copious amounts of rainfall during the monsoons, but the actual amount varies within the region due to the varied topography. In general, rainfall is higher at higher altitudes and decreases from the west to the east due to the rain shadow effect. Eighty per cent of the rainfall occurs during the south-west monsoon between June and September. The park also receives a significant amount of rainfall during the north-east monsoon between October and November.

The park being completely enclosed within a ring of hills, has its own micro-climate and probably receives some convectional rainfall, in addition to rain from the two monsoons. In the remaining months, condensation on vegetation of mist shrouding the valley is estimated to yield 15 per cent of the total water generated in the rainforest.

In 2006, the Walakkad area of the park received the highest ever annual rainfall of 9,569.6 mm. In 2000, the figure was 7,788 mm; in 2001, 8,351.9 mm; in 2004, 8465.3 mm; and in 2005, 9,347.8 mm. The annual rainfall received in the valley (at Sairandhri?) was 7,788.8 mm in 2000; 8,361.9 mm in 2001. In 2002, 4,262.5 mm; in 2003, 3,499.65 mm; in 2004, 6,521.27 mm, in 2005, 6,919.38 mm; in 2006, 6,845.05 mm; in 2007, 6,009.35 mm; and in 2008 it was 4386.5 mm. The figure till October 2009 was 5,477.4 mm. Average annual rainfall in the park between 2000 and 2008 was thus 6,066 mm.

The mean annual temperature is 20.2 °C. The hottest months are April and May when the mean temperature is 23 °C and the coolest months are January and February when the mean temperature is 18 °C. Because of the high rainfall, the relative humidity is consistently high (above 95%) between June and December.

== Indigenous people ==
There is no record of the valley ever having been settled, but the Mudugar and Irula tribal people are indigenous to the area and do live in the adjacent valley of Attappady Reserved Forest. Also, the Kurumbar people live in the highest range outside the park bordering on the Nilgiris.

Many of the Mudugar, Irula and Kurumbar now work as day labourers and porters. 16 out of 21 tribal colonies in the Attappady range cultivate marijuana. Many Mudugar are in abject poverty and easily recruited by the so-called ganja mafia. In 2006, it was planned to employ 50 additional men from the 21 tribal settlements as forest guards.

== Flora and fauna ==
The valley areas of the park are in a Tropical and subtropical moist broadleaf forests Ecoregion. Hilly areas above 1,000 m are in the South Western Ghats montane rain forests region. Above 1,500 m, the evergreen forests begin to give way to stunted forests, called sholas, interspersed with open grassland, both of which are of interest to ecologists as the rich biodiversity here has never been disturbed by human settlements. Several threatened species are endemic here. New plant and animal species are often discovered here.

=== Fauna ===
==== Birds ====
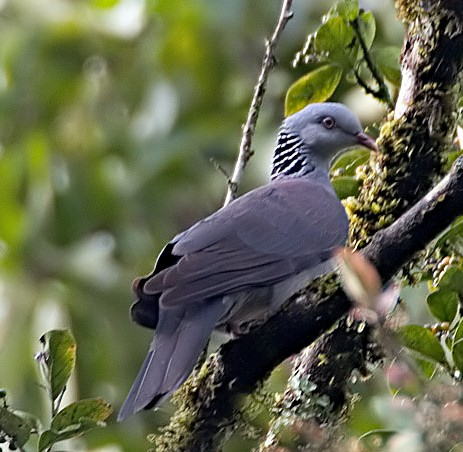
A Nilgiri wood-pigeon

Birdlife International lists 16 bird species in Silent Valley as threatened or restricted:- Nilgiri wood-pigeon, Malabar parakeet, Malabar grey hornbill, white-bellied treepie, grey-headed bulbul, broad-tailed grassbird, rufous babbler, Wynaad laughingthrush, Nilgiri laughing thrush, Nilgiri blue robin, black-and-rufous flycatcher, Nilgiri flycatcher, white-bellied blue-flycatcher, crimson-backed sunbird and Nilgiri pipit.

Rare bird species found here include the Ceylon frogmouth and great Indian hornbill. The 2006 winter bird survey discovered the long-legged buzzard, a new species of raptor at Sispara, the park's highest peak. The survey found 10 endangered species recorded in the IUCN Red List including the red winged crested cuckoo, Malabar pied hornbill and pale harrier. The area is home to 15 endemic species including the black-and-orange flycatcher. It recorded 138 species of birds including 17 species that were newly observed in the Silent Valley area. The most abundant bird was the square-tailed bulbul.

==== Mammals ====
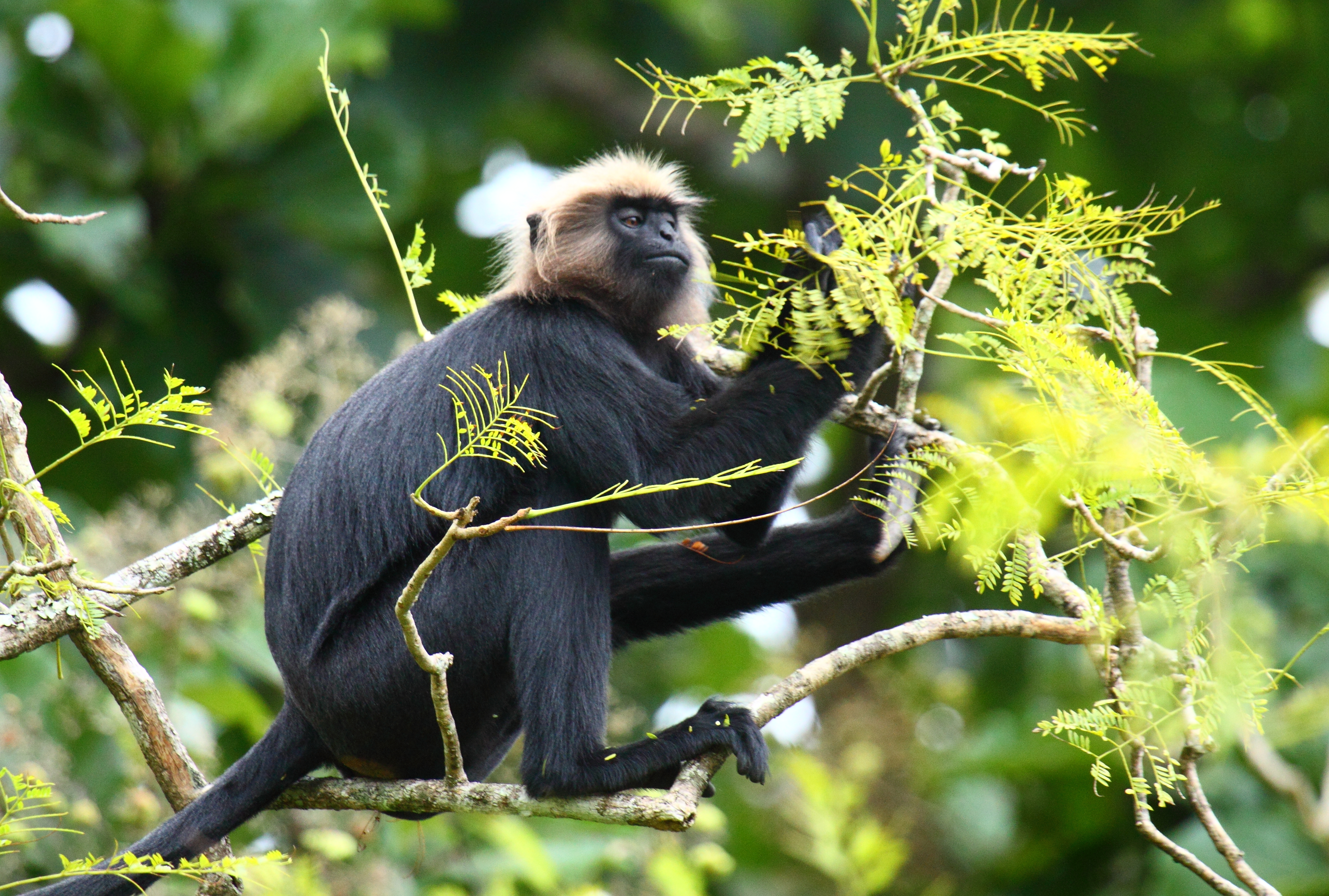
Nilgiri langur

There are at least 34 species of mammals at Silent Valley including the threatened lion-tailed macaque, Nilgiri langur, Malabar giant squirrel, Nilgiri tahr, Peshwa's bat (Myotis peshwa) and hairy-winged bat. There are nine species of bats, rats and mice.

Distribution and demography of all diurnal primates were studied in Silent Valley National Park and adjacent areas for a period of three years from 1993 to 1996. Fourteen troops of lion-tailed macaque, eighty-five troops of Nilgiri langur, fifteen troops of bonnet macaque and seven troops of Hanuman langur were observed. Of these, the Nilgiri langur was randomly distributed, whereas the lion-tailed macaque troops were confined to the southern sector of the Park. Bonnet macaques and Hanuman langurs were occasional visitors. The Silent Valley forest remains one of the most undisturbed viable habitats left for the endemic and endangered primates lion-tailed macaque and Nilgiri langur.

==== Insects ====
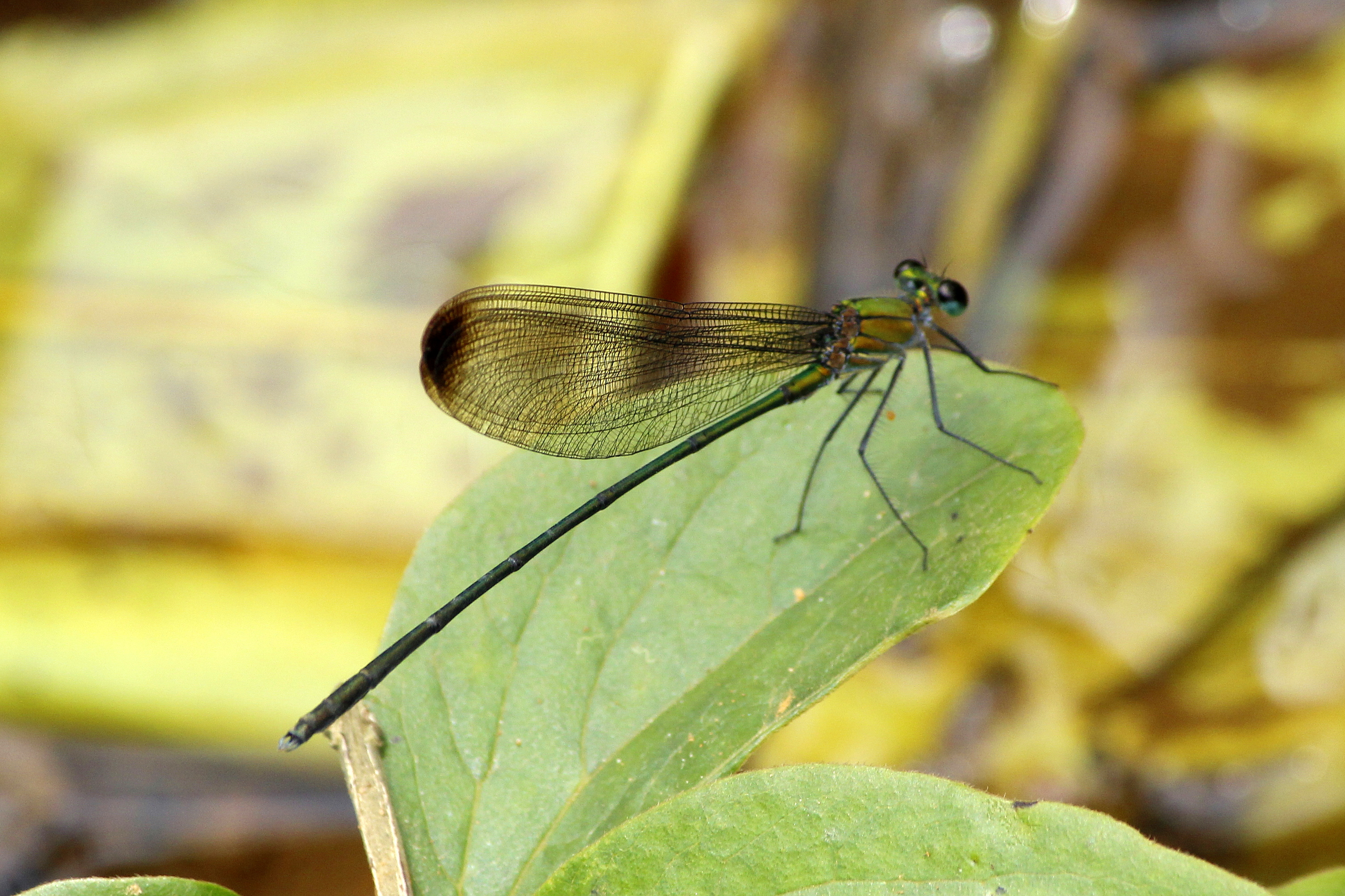
Vestalis submontana, endemic to Western Ghats

There are at least 730 identified species of insects in the park. The maximum number of species belong to the orders Lepidoptera and Coleoptera. Many unclassified species have been collected and there is a need for further studies.

33 species of crickets and grasshoppers have been recorded of which one was new. 41 species of true bugs (eight new) have been recorded. 128 species of beetles including 10 new species have been recorded.

Over 128 species of butterflies and 400 species of moths live here. A 1993 study found butterflies belonging to 9 families. The families Nymphalidae and Papilionidae contained the maximum number of species. 13 species were endemic to South India, including 5 species having protected status. Seven species of butterflies were observed migrating in a mixed swarm of thousands of butterflies towards the Silent Valley National Park. In one instance an observer noted several birds attempting to catch these butterflies.

A survey jointly conducted by Indian Dragonfly Society and the Forest and Wildlife Department in September 2018 in the buffer zone of the Silent Valley National Park found 83 species of odonata. The species found include Indosticta deccanensis, Burmagomphus laidlawi, Microgomphus souteri, Onychogomphus nilgiriensis, Euphaea dispar, Idionyx travancorensis, Megalogomphus hannyngtoni and Lestes dorothea. A survey jointly conducted by Society for Odonate Studies and the Forest and Wildlife Department in September 2019 in the core and buffer zones of the Silent Valley National Park found 75 species of odonata including 8 new species, bringing the total number of odonate in Silent Valley to 91 species. The species found include Hemicordulia asiatica, Macrogomphus wynaadicus, Lamelligomphus nilgiriensis, Epithemis mariae, Palpopleura sexmaculata, Neurothemis intermedia, Agriocnemis splendidissima, Lestes dorothea, Onychargia atrocyana, Phylloneura westermanni, Euphaea dispar, and Protosticta gravelyi. A survey jointly conducted by Society for Odonate Studies and the Forest and Wildlife Department in 2023 in the core and buffer zones of the Silent Valley National Park found 3 more new odonate species, bringing the total number of odonate in Silent Valley to 103 species. The species found include Megalogomphus hannyngtoni, Caconeura risi, and Melanoneura bilineata. A survey jointly conducted by Society for Odonate Studies and the Forest and Wildlife Department in October 2025 in the core and buffer zones of the Silent Valley National Park found 6 more new odonate species, bringing the total number of odonate in Silent Valley to 109 species. The species found include Merogomphus longistigma, Macromia irata, Macromidia donaldi, Protosticta mortoni, Euphaea wayanadensis, and Elattoneura tetrica.

==== Other ====
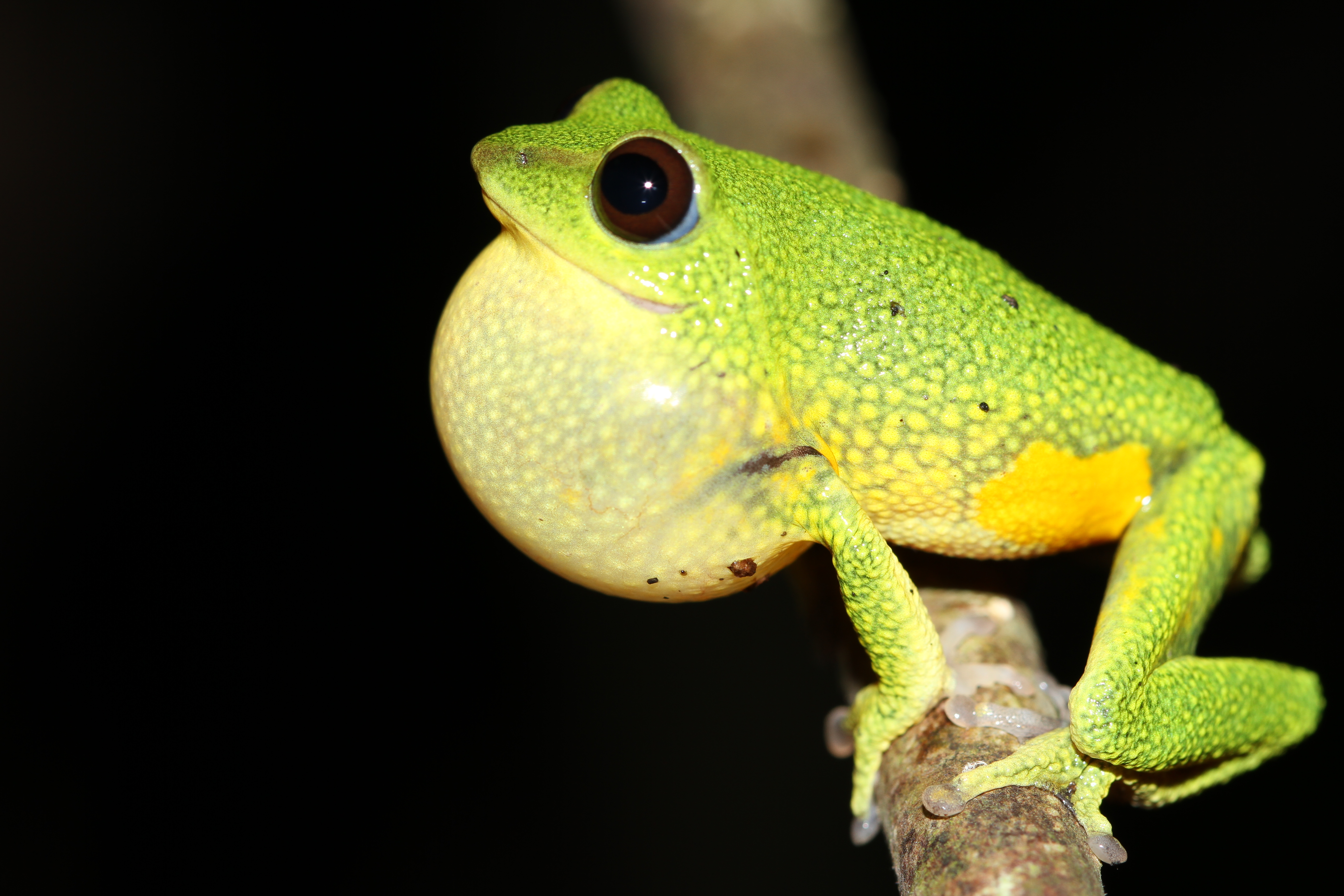
Silent Valley Bush Frog, Raorchestes silentvalley

At least 500 species of earthworms and leeches have also been identified in the park.

The Silent Valley Bush Frog, Raorchestes silentvalley, first described in 2016, is named after the park.

=== Flora ===
The flora of the valley include more than 1,000 species of flowering plants, 108 species of orchids, 100 ferns and fern allies, 200 liverworts, 75 lichens and about 200 algae. A majority of these plants are endemic to the Western Ghats.

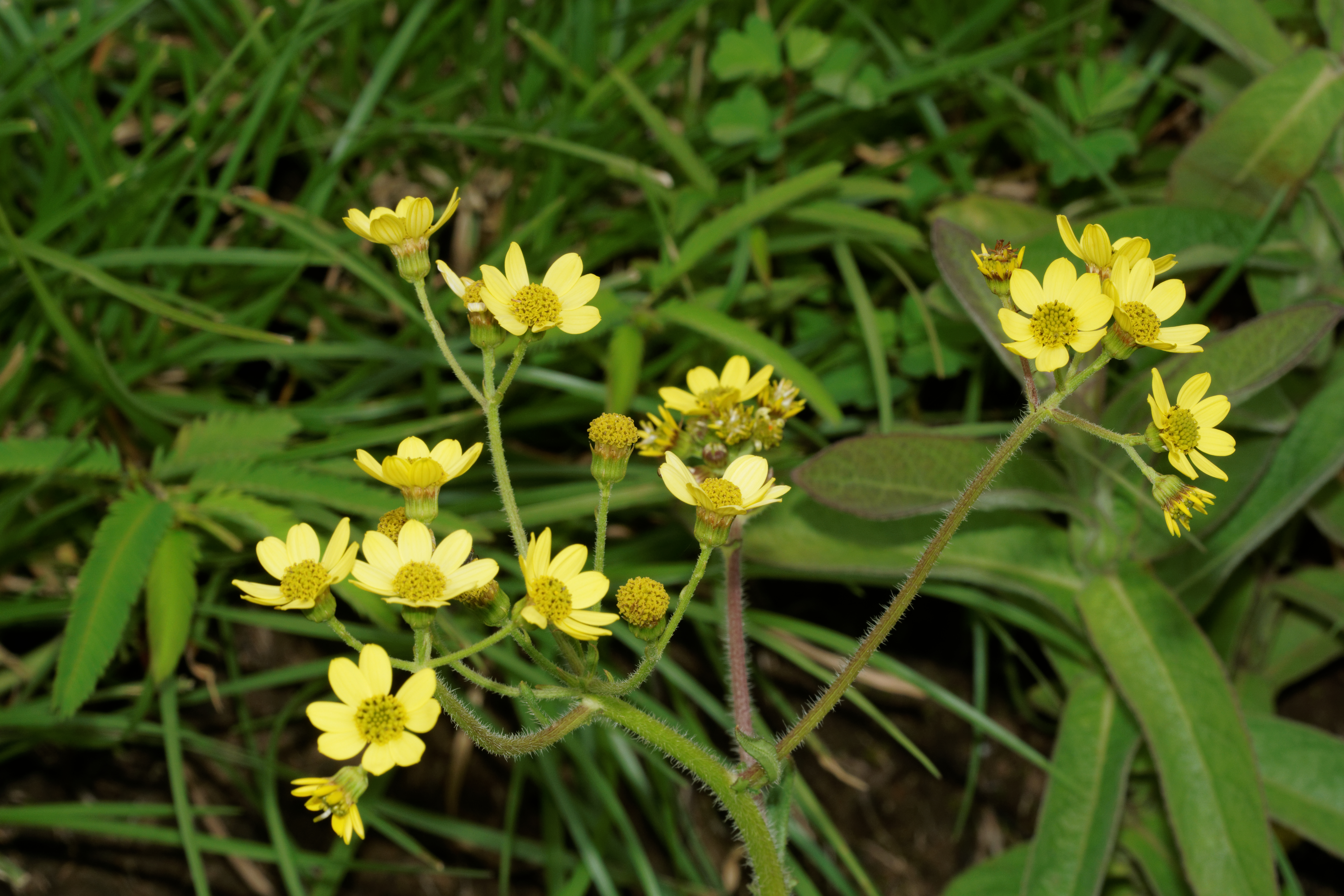
Senecio neelgherryanus in Silent Valley

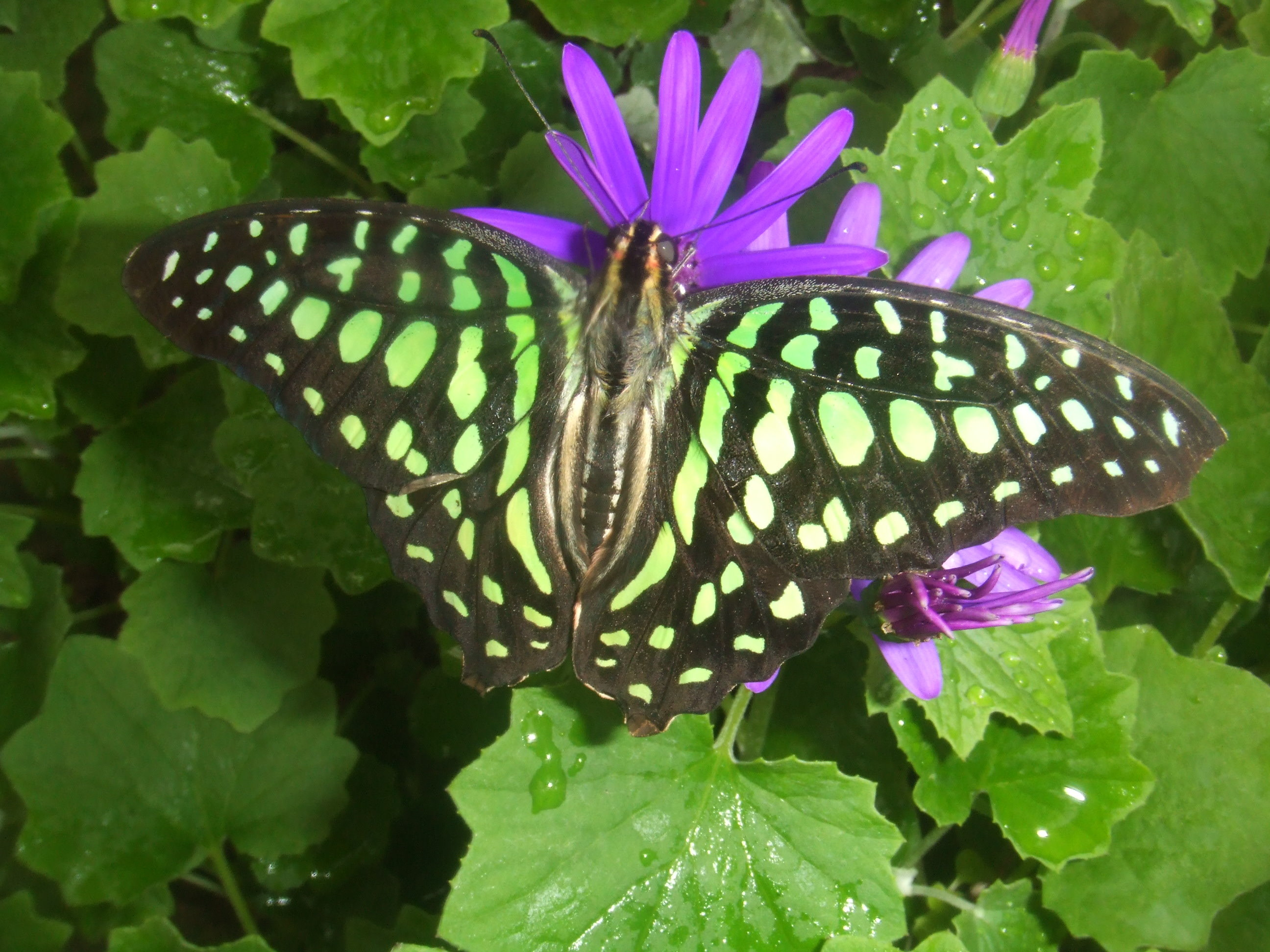
Tailed jay nectoring on a daisy

==== Flowering plants ====
Angiosperm flora currently identified here include 966 species belonging to 134 families and 599 genera. There are 701 Dicotyledons distributed among 113 families and 420 genera. There are 265 Monocotyledons here distributed among 21 families and 139 genera. Families best represented are the Orchids with 108 species including the rare, endemic and highly endangered orchids Ipsea malabarica, Bulbophyllum silentvalliensis and Eria tiagii, Grasses (56), Legumes (55), Rubiaceae (49) and Asters (45). There are many rare, endemic and economically valuable species, such as cardamom Ellettaria cardamomum, black pepper Piper nigrum, yams Dioscorea spp., beans Phaseolus sp., a pest-resistant strain of rice Oryza Pittambi, and 110 plant species of importance in Ayurvedic medicine. Seven new plant species have been recorded from Silent Valley, including in 1996, Impatiens sivarajanii, a new species of Balsaminaceae.

==== Trees ====
Occurrence of lion-tailed macaque is dependent on the flowering of Cullenia exarillata in the forest.

Six distinct tree associations have been described in the valley. Three are restricted to the southern sector:

1. Cullenia exarillata and Palaquium ellipticum
2. Palaquium ellipticum and Mesua ferrea (Indian rose chestnut)
3. Mesua ferrea and Calophyllum elatum

The remainder are confined to the central and northern parts of the park:

1. Palaquium ellipticum and Poeciloneuron indicum
2. Calophyllum elatum and Ochlandra species
3. Poeciloneuron indicum and Ochlandra species

A study of natural regeneration of 12 important tree species of Silent Valley tropical rain forests showed good natural regeneration of all 12 species. The species studied were Palaquium ellipticum, Cullenia exarillata, Poeciloneuron indicum, Myristica dactyloides, Elaeocarpus glandulosus, Litsea floribunda, Mesua nagassarium, Cinnamomum malabatrum, Agrostistachys meeboldii, Calophyllum polyanthum, Garcinia morella and Actinodaphne campanulata.

In 2001 selective felling of three trees per acre led to the cutting of 48,000 m^{3} of timber from about 20 km^{2}.

== Genetic resources ==
Throughout human history about 10% of the genetic stock found in the wild has been bred into palatable and higher yielding cereals, fruits and vegetables. Future food security depends on the preservation of the remaining 90% of the stock through protection of high biodiversity habitats like Silent valley.

The National Bureau of Plant Genetic Resources of ICAR (India), Plant Exploration and Collection Division has identified Silent Valley as high in bio-diversity and an important gene pool resource for recombinant DNA innovations. An important example of use of wild germplasm is gene selection from the wild varieties of rice Oryza nivara (central India) and Oryza Pittambi found in Silent Valley for the traits of broad spectrum disease resistance in high yielding hybrid rice varieties including IR-36, which are responsible for much of the Green Revolution throughout Asia.

Also, genetic evaluation of plant growth promoting Rhizobacteria obtained from Silent Valley indicated that strain, IISR 331, could increase the growth of black pepper cuttings by 228% and showed 82.7% inhibition of the common plant wilting disease Phytopthora capsici in laboratory tests (in vitro).

== Challenges ==
=== Forest fire ===
Fire is one of the major threats facing forests in Kerala. People engaged in grazing livestock often burn an area to get fresh grass shoots for their cattle, especially during dry season when fire danger is greatest. Also, illicit activities like ganja cultivation, poaching, tree felling, non timber forest products (NTFP) collection and very often careless tourists and pilgrims are responsible for big forest fires.

=== Cannabis cultivation ===
Silent Valley is home to some of India's largest illegal plantations of cannabis. Cannabis is one of the traditional plantations in these forests and there are people who depend on 'Ganja economy' for a livelihood. Tribes like Irula, Muduga and Kurumba (particularly the last one) have always grown cannabis in their history. The seedless variety of cannabis cultivated in Silent Valley is known as Sairandhri and is renowned internationally for its quality.

According to former additional chief secretary Madhava Menon, the cannabis cultivated here is one of the best in the world and is sold worldwide. The cannabis mafia has cut hundreds of acres of evergreen tropical forest in the Attappady Hills, including Silent Valley buffer zones, for illegal cultivation of the cash crop. The Forest Department had an ambitious plan to root out ganja cultivation from the Attappady forests by April 2006.

=== Maoist presence ===
The ticket counter of the Silent Valley National Park at Mukkali was attacked by a group of Maoists in December 2014. A big contingent of special police has been deployed there since then, but the growing influence of Maoist groups in tribal east Kerala is of grave concern.
