= South Western Ghats montane rain forests =

Ecoregion in South India

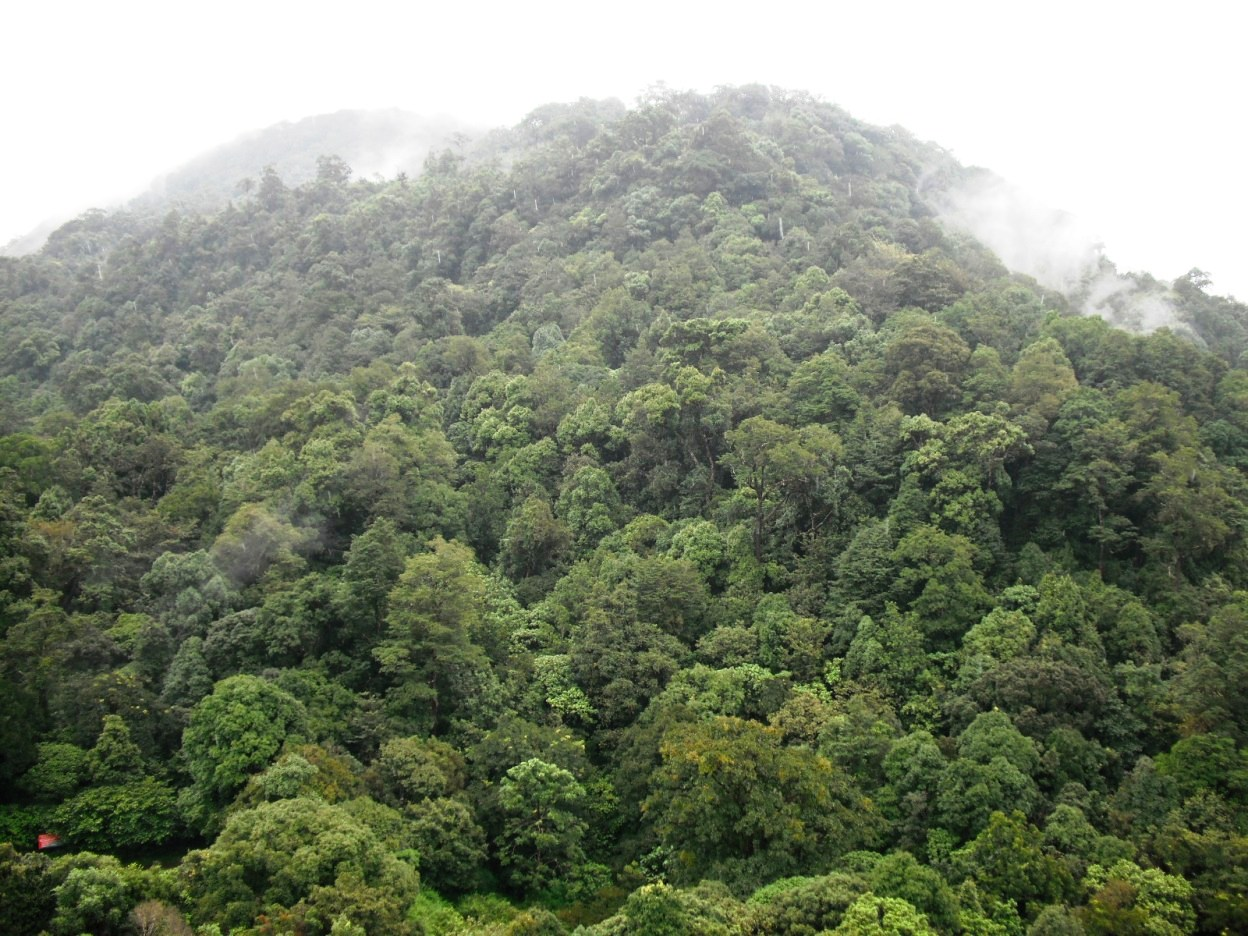
- View of montane rain forest in Silent Valley National Park, Nilgiri mountains

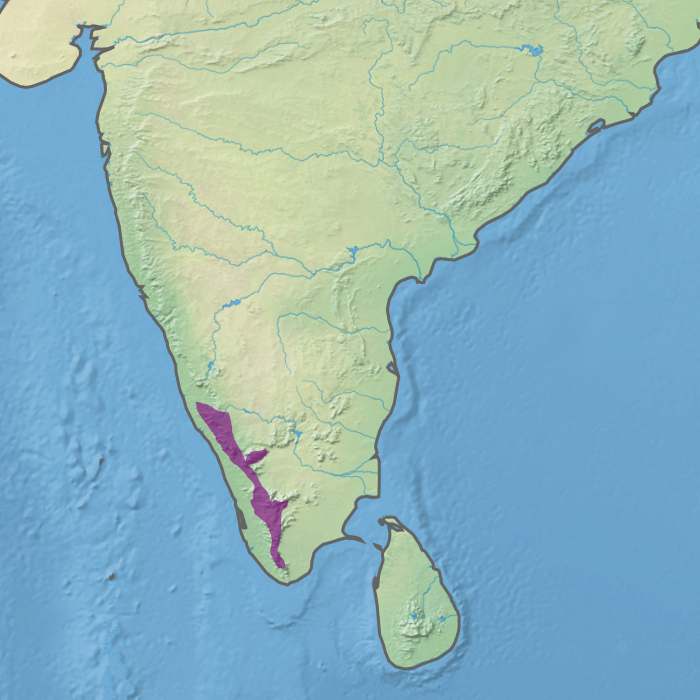
- Ecoregion territory (in purple)

Ecology
- Realm: Indomalayan
- Biome: Tropical and subtropical moist broadleaf forests
- Borders: Malabar Coast moist forests; North Western Ghats montane rain forests; South Western Ghats moist deciduous forests

Geography
- Area: 22,500 km^{2} (8,700 mi^{2})
- Country: India
- States: Karnataka; Kerala; Tamil Nadu
- Elevation: 1,000 to 2,695 m (3,281 to 8,842 ft)
- Rivers: Periyar River
- Climate type: tropical

Conservation
- Conservation status: critical/endangered
- Protected: 5,998 km^{2} (2,316 sq mi)%

The South Western Ghats montane rain forests is an ecoregion in South India, covering the southern portion of the Western Ghats in Karnataka, Kerala and Tamil Nadu at elevations from 1,000 to 2,695 m (3,281 to 8,842 ft). Annual rainfall in this ecoregion exceeds 2,800 mm (110 in).

== Setting ==
The ecoregion is the most species rich in peninsular India and is home to numerous endemic species. It covers an area of 22,600 square kilometers (8,700 sq mi). It is estimated that two-thirds of the original forests have been cleared, and only 3,200 square kilometers, or 15% of the intact area, is protected.

The southern portion of the Western Ghats contains the highest peaks in the range, notably Anamudi in Kerala, at 2695 meters elevation. The Ghats intercept the moisture-laden monsoon winds off the Arabian Sea, and the average annual precipitation exceeds 2,800 mm. The northeast monsoon from October to November supplements the June to September southwest monsoon. The South Western Ghats are the wettest portion of peninsular India and are surrounded by drier ecoregions to the east and north.

== Protected areas ==
As of 1997, this ecoregion encompassed the following 16 protected areas with an area of 3,250 km^{2} (1,250 sq mi):

- in Karnataka: Talakaveri Wildlife Sanctuary with 250 km^{2} (97 sq mi), Brahmagiri Wildlife Sanctuary with 190 km^{2} (73 sq mi), Pushpagiri Wildlife Sanctuary with 60 km (37 mi)
- in Kerala: Periyar National Park with 540 km^{2} (210 sq mi), Shenduruny Wildlife Sanctuary with 300 km^{2} (120 sq mi), Parambikulam Wildlife Sanctuary with 260 km^{2} (100 sq mi), Karimpuzha National Park with 230 km^{2} (89 sq mi), Silent Valley National Park with 110 km^{2} (42 sq mi), Idukki Wildlife Sanctuary with 80 km^{2} (31 sq mi), Eravikulam National Park with 97 km^{2} (37 sq mi), Aralam Wildlife Sanctuary with 50 km^{2} (19 sq mi), Peppara Wildlife Sanctuary with 40 km^{2} (15 sq mi)
- in Tamil Nadu: Anamalai Tiger Reserve with 600 km^{2} (230 sq mi), Kalakkad Mundanthurai Tiger Reserve with 290 km^{2} (110 sq mi), Megamalai Wildlife Sanctuary with 120 km^{2} (46 sq mi) and Mukurthi National Park with 60 km^{2} (23 sq mi)

As of 2017, the total size of protected areas within this ecoregion amounted to 5,998 km^{2} (2,316 sq mi), equivalent to 27% of the ecoregion's extent. Another 62% is forested but outside protected areas.

Several of the protected areas in the northern portion are included within the Nilgiri Biosphere Reserve, and the Agasthyamala Biosphere Reserve covers the southern portion.

== Flora ==
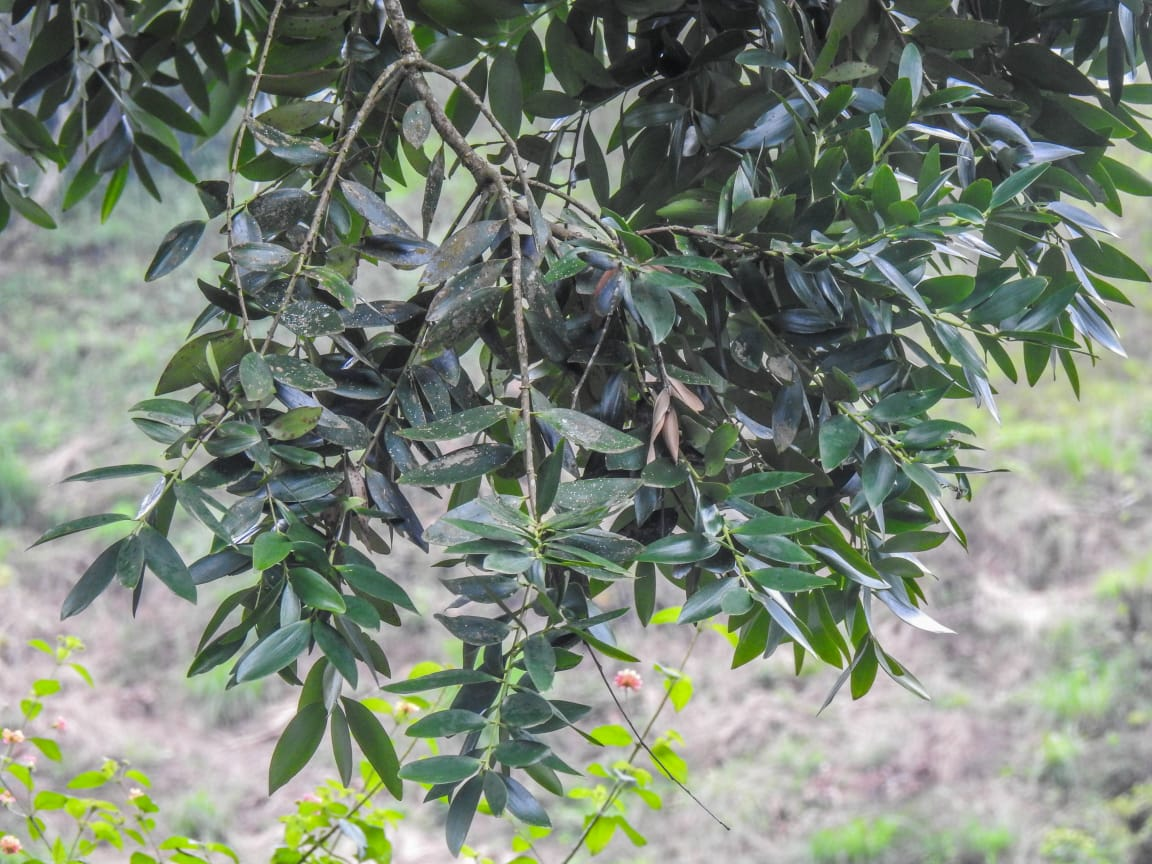
Nageia wallichiana

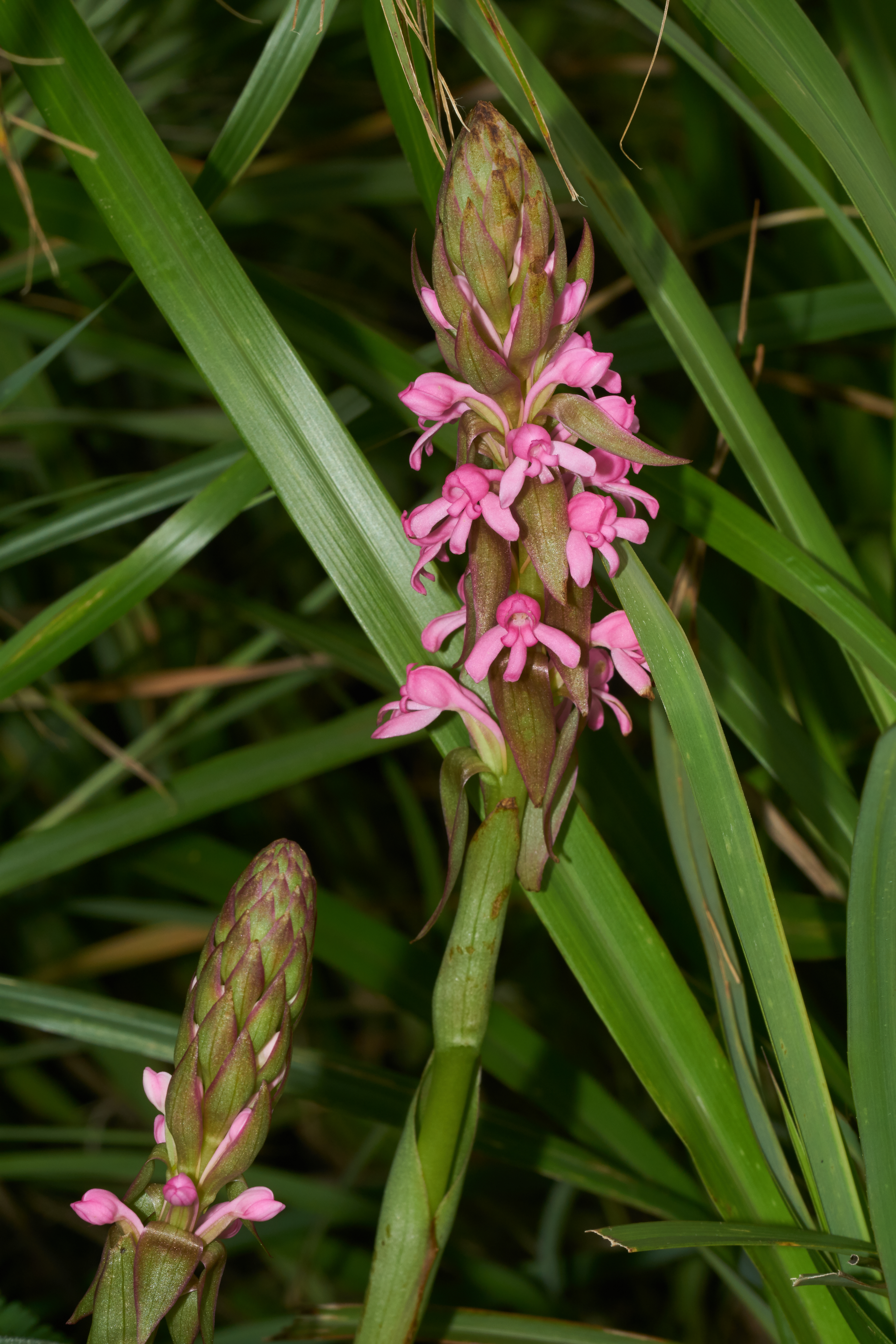
Satyrium nepalense in Silent Valley National Park

The cool and moist climate, high rainfall, and variety of microclimates brought about by differences in elevation and exposure supports lush and diverse forests; 35% of the plant species are endemic to the ecoregion. Moist evergreen montane forests are the predominant habitat type. The montane evergreen forests support a great diversity of species ( Animals and plants ). The trees generally form a canopy at 15 to 20 m, and the forests are multistoried and rich in epiphytes, especially orchids. Characteristic canopy trees are Cullenia exarillata, Mesua ferrea, Palaquium ellipticum, Gluta travancorica, and Nageia wallichiana. Nageia is a podocarp conifer with origins in the ancient supercontinent of Gondwana, of which India was formerly part, and a number of other plants in the ecoregion have Gondwana origins. Other evergreen tree species of the montane forest include Calophyllum austroindicum, Garcinia rubroechinata, Garcinia travancorica, Diospyros barberi, Memecylon subramanii, Memecylon gracile, Goniothalamus rhynchantherus, and Monosis travancorica.

The other major habitat type in this ecoregion is the shola-grassland complex at elevations of 1,900 to 2,220 m (6,230 to 7,280 ft). Shola is a stunted forest with small trees including Prunus ceylanica, Heptapleurum racemosum, Chionanthus ramiflorus, Syzygium spp., Rhododendron arboreum subsp. nilagiricum, Mahonia napaulensis, Elaeocarpus recurvatus, Ilex denticulata, Magnolia nilagirica, Actinodaphne bourdillonii, and Litsea wightiana. The understorey consists of dense shrubs. These shola forest patches are interspersed with montane grasslands characterized by frost- and fire-resistant grass species like Chrysopogon nodulibarbis, Cymbopogon flexuosus, Arundinella ciliata, Arundinella mesophylla, Arundinella tuberculata, Themeda tremula, and Sehima nervosa.

== Fauna ==
Endemic fauna

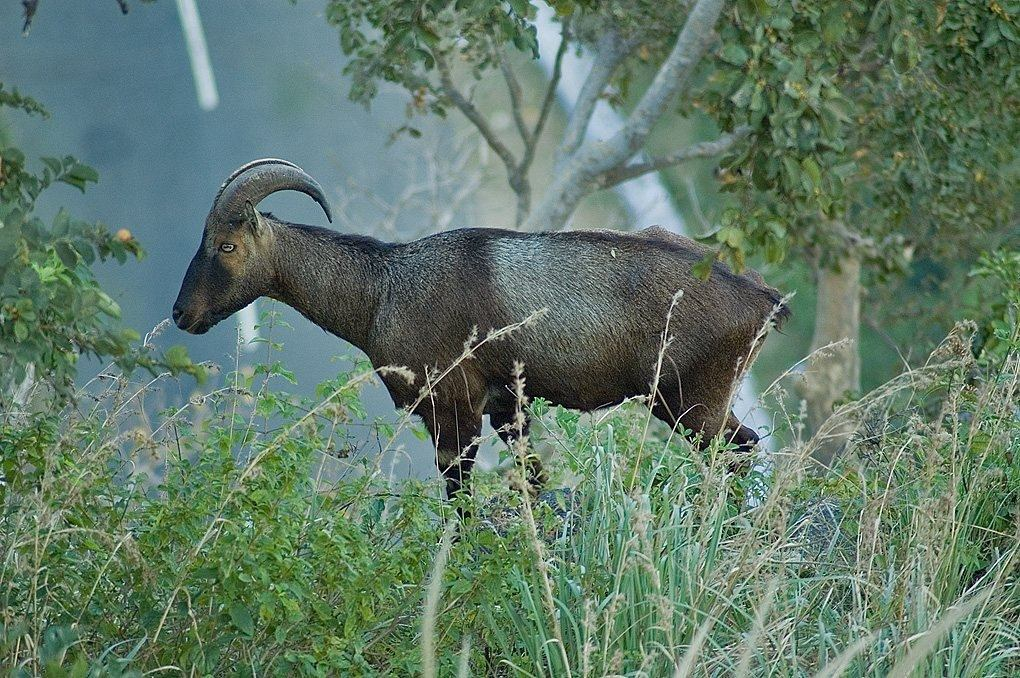
Nilgiri tahr in Valparai, Anaimalai Hills

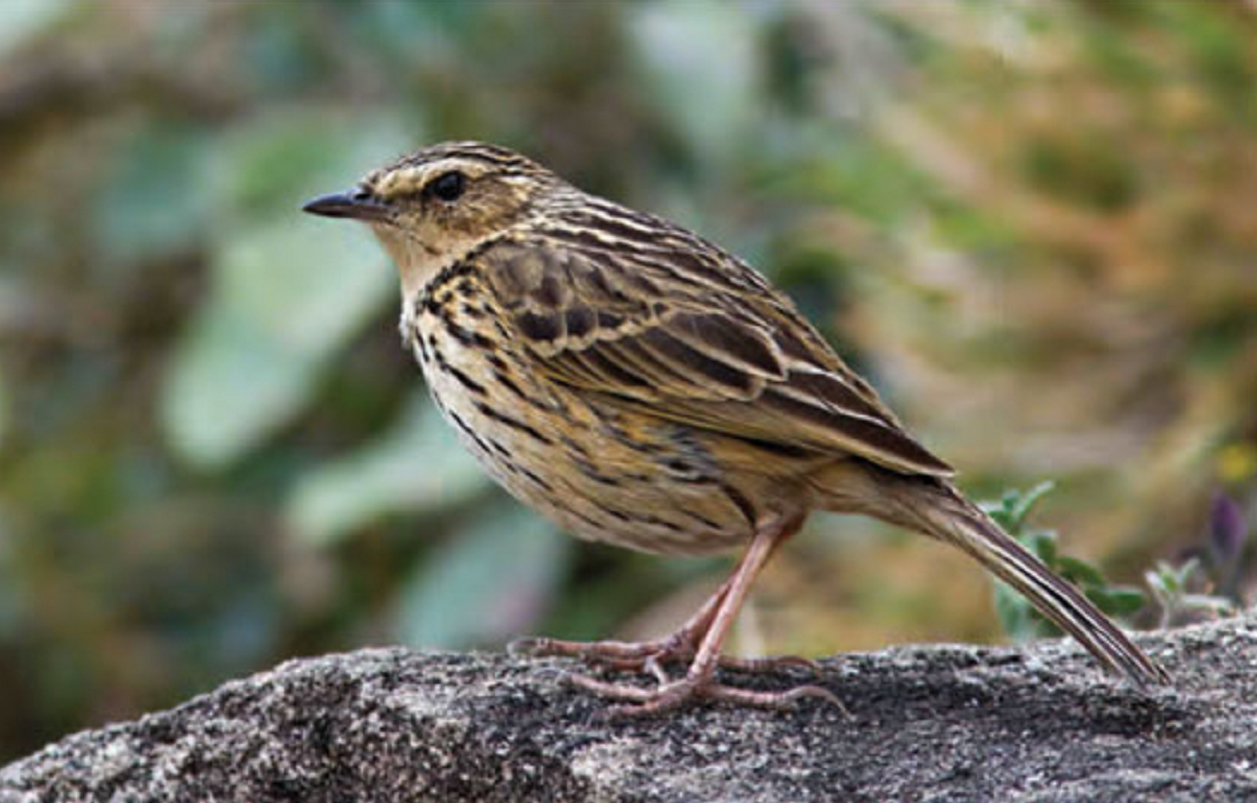
Nilgiri pipit in the Nilgiri mountains

Endemic fauna in this ecoregion include Nilgiri tahr (Nilgiritragus hylocrius), Nilgiri pipit (Anthus nilghiriensis), Nilgiri laughingthrush (Montecincla cachinnans), broad-tailed grassbird (Schoenicola platyurus), Nilgiri long-tailed tree mouse (Vandeleuria nilagirica), eight endemic reptile genera encompassing Brachyophidium, Dravidogecko, Melanophidium, Plectrurus, Ristella, Salea, Teretrurus and Xylophis with 90 species, and the six amphibian genera Indotyphlus, Melanobatrachus, Nannobatrachus, Nyctibatrachus, Ranixalus and Uraeotyphlus. The ecoregion also hosts Nilgiri langur (Semnopithecus johnii), Malabar large-spotted civet (Viverra civettina), brown palm civet (Paradoxurus jerdoni), Salim Ali's fruit bat (Latidens salimalii), Nilgiri striped squirrel (Funambulus sublineatus) and Layard's palm squirrel (F. layardi).
