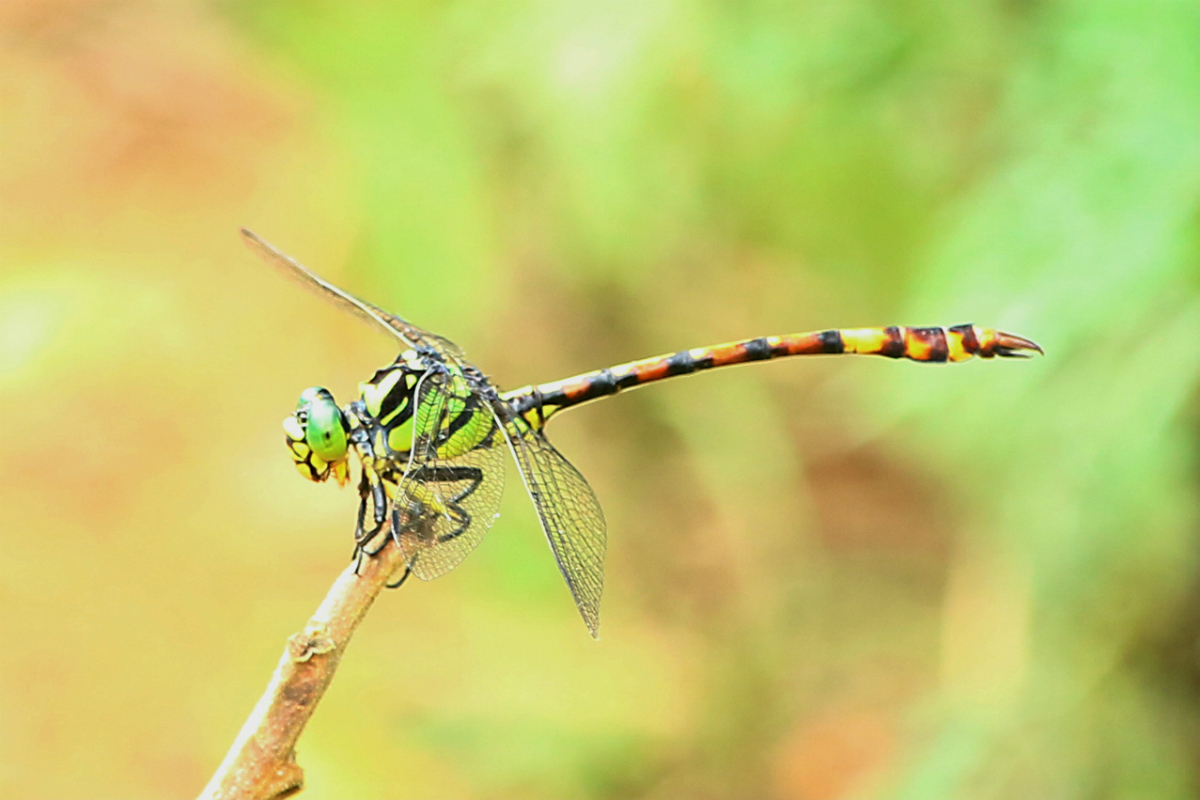
- Male

Conservation status
- Data Deficient (IUCN 3.1)

Scientific classification
- Kingdom: Animalia
- Phylum: Arthropoda
- Class: Insecta
- Order: Odonata
- Infraorder: Anisoptera
- Family: Gomphidae
- Genus: Megalogomphus
- Species: M. superbus

Binomial name
- Megalogomphus superbus Fraser, 1931

= Megalogomphus superbus =

Species of dragonfly

Megalogomphus superbus, is a species of dragonfly in the family Gomphidae. It is known only from the Western Ghats of India.

== Description and habitat ==
It is a large dragonfly with bottle-green eyes. Its thorax is velvet-black marked with tender-foliage green. Segment 1 of the abdomen is black with lower part of sides and middle of apical border dorsally pale grass-green. Segment 2 is black with a mid-dorsal stripe bordered with yellow or grass-green. Segment 3 is with a narrow mid-dorsal stripe in green to yellow. The apical third of the segment is black, the medial third except on mid-dorsum bright reddish-brown. Segments 4 to 6 are similar to 3; but the middle third of all segments is entirely reddish-brown. Segment 7 has basal two-thirds citron-yellow and apical third black. Segment 8 is dark reddish-brown changing to black on dorsum. Segment 9 is similar but with the lateral spot much larger and brighter yellow. Segment 10 is reddish-brown. Anal appendages are reddish-brown, paler at base.

It differs from Megalogomphus hannyngtoni by the red medial markings of abdominal segments 3 to 6, by the occiput being yellow instead of black and the face less black, and by the presence of a humeral stripes.

This dragonfly perches on twigs, shrubs, and boulders in hill streams. It breeds in fast flowing forested hill streams.

== See also ==
- List of odonates of India
- List of odonata of Kerala
