= Megalogomphus ceylonicus =

Scientific classification
- Domain: Eukaryota
- Kingdom: Animalia
- Phylum: Arthropoda
- Class: Insecta
- Order: Odonata
- Infraorder: Anisoptera
- Family: Gomphidae
- Genus: Megalogomphus
- Species: M. ceylonicus

Binomial name
- Megalogomphus ceylonicus Laidlaw, 1922

Species of dragonfly

Megalogomphus ceylonicus, the Sri Lanka sabretail, is a species of dragonfly in the family Gomphidae. It is endemic to Sri Lanka.

== See also ==
- List of odonates of Sri Lanka
