= Impatiens sivarajanii =

Scientific classification
- Kingdom: Plantae
- Clade: Embryophytes
- Clade: Tracheophytes
- Clade: Spermatophytes
- Clade: Angiosperms
- Clade: Eudicots
- Clade: Asterids
- Order: Ericales
- Family: Balsaminaceae
- Genus: Impatiens
- Species: I. sivarajanii

Binomial name
- Impatiens sivarajanii M. Kumar & Sequiera

Species of flowering plant

Impatiens sivarajanii is a species of flowering plant in the family Balsaminaceae. It is endemic to Kerala in India. It was described from Silent Valley National Park in 1996.

This perennial herb grows as an epiphyte on mossy tree trunks. It has a purple-tinged white tuber. The plant grows about 10 centimeters long. The cream-white flowers are about 2 centimeters long. The fruit capsule contains tiny orange hair-tufted seeds.
