= Karimpuzha National Park =

Proposed national park in southern India

Karimpuzha National Park (Malayalam: കരിമ്പുഴ നാഷണൽ പാർക്ക്‌) is a 230 km² proposed National Park located at 11°16′30″N 76°25′25″E in the Nilgiri Hills area of Kerala and Tamil Nadu, in South India, IUCN category: PRO

== History ==
Madras Forest Act came into force in 1882. The forests of Mannarkkad, New Amarambalam, Silent Valley, Walayar and Chennath Nair Reserve were declared as Reserved Forests during 1883 – 1887.

In 1988 the Wildlife Institute of India recommended that Mannarkkadu Valley 225.00 km^{2} be established as a protected area. Given that this valley is inhabited by forest-dependent tribes, sanctuary rather than national park status is more appropriate in the short-term. Such proposals were submitted to the Kerala Government.

In 1991 the UNESCO World Heritage Committee strongly encouraged the Indian authorities to re-formulate the boundaries of Silent Valley National Park to take in a larger area, particularly the adjacent Mannarkkadu Valley National Park and the Nilgiri Thar Wildlife Sanctuary and complete the legal processes to establish the proposed Mannarkkadu Valley National Park and upgrade the status of the Nilgiri Thar Wildlife Sanctuary.

Silent Valley National Park was nominated as a World Heritage Site in 1990 but the decision regarding its inclusion in the World Heritage List was deferred by the committee pending the Indian Government's revision of the nominated area's boundary to include the adjacent Karimpuzha Valley National Park and the Nilgiri Tahr Wildlife Sanctuary, and the completion of legal measures to establish the Mannarkkadu Valley National Park and upgrade the legal status of the Nilgiri Tahr Wildlife Sanctuary.

In 1997 United Nations Environment Programme's World Conservation Monitoring Centre listed Karimpuza as a Protected area that overlaps with the South Western Ghats montane rain forests Ecoregion. IUCNcategory PRO (proposed)

In 1998 Karimpuzha was listed by the first World Heritage Forest meeting in Berastagi, Indonesia, as being of potential interest as a World Heritage Forest.

In 2006 Karimpuzha was listed as a proposed Wildlife Sanctuary by the Ministry of Environment and Forests (India). KARIMPUZHA Biounit 05B, 225.00 km^{2}
