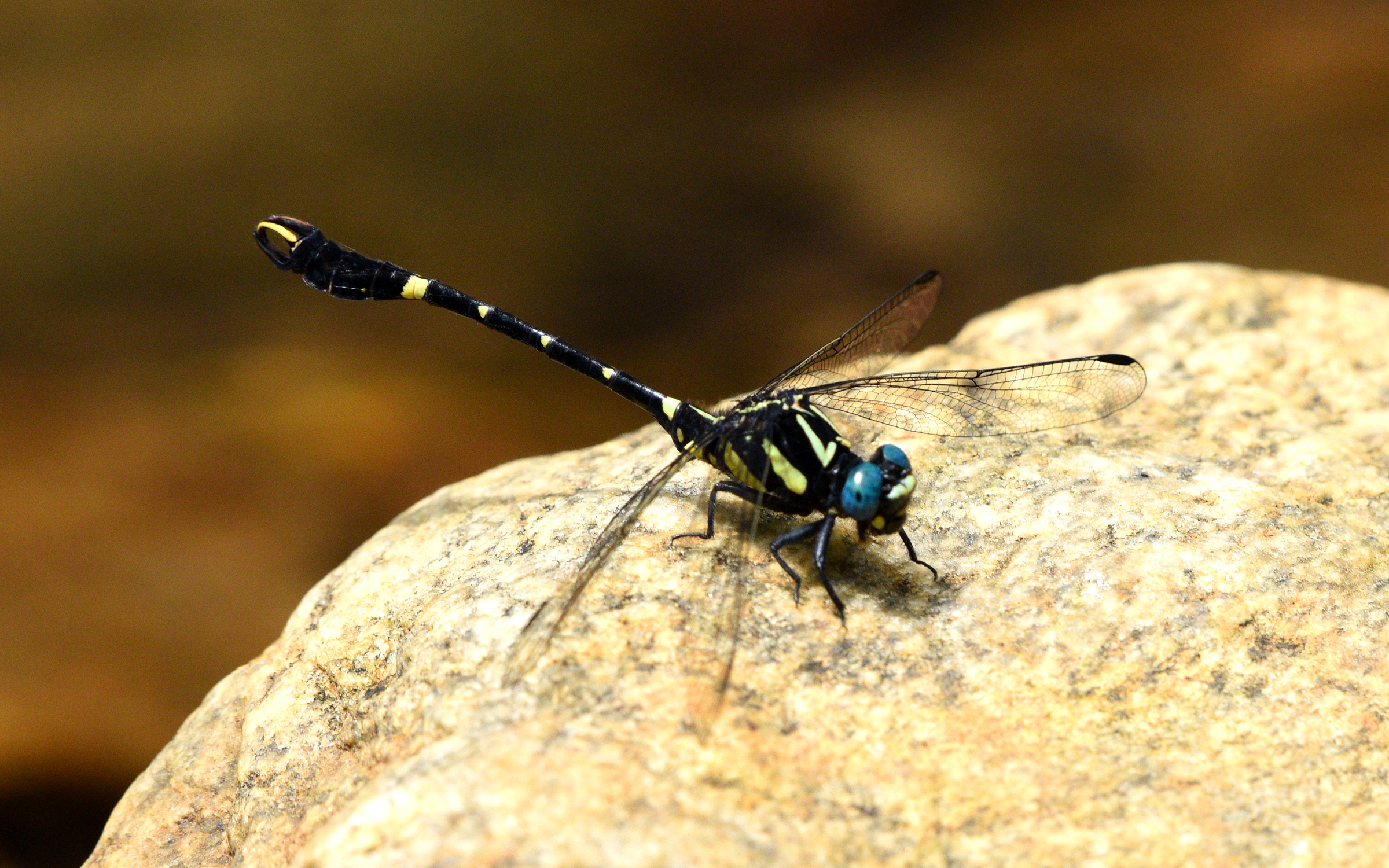
- Male

Conservation status
- Least Concern (IUCN 3.1)

Scientific classification
- Kingdom: Animalia
- Phylum: Arthropoda
- Class: Insecta
- Order: Odonata
- Infraorder: Anisoptera
- Family: Gomphidae
- Genus: Lamelligomphus
- Species: L. nilgiriensis

Binomial name
- Lamelligomphus nilgiriensis (Fraser, 1922)

Synonyms
- Onychogomphus nilgiriensis Fraser, 1922

= Lamelligomphus nilgiriensis =

Species of dragonfly

Lamelligomphus nilgiriensis is a species of dragonfly in the family Gomphidae. It is endemic to the hill streams of Western Ghats of India. This species has been placed by many authors in Onychogomphus but should be included in Lamelligomphus following Fraser (1934), based on the shape of the male anal appendages.

== Description and habitat ==
It is a medium-sized dragonfly with bottle-green eyes. Its thorax black, marked with greenish-yellow. There is a mesothoracic collar and an oblique antehumeral stripe, generally connected with the mesothoracic collar. Even if they are separated, the lower end of the stripe is squared; not pointed as in Melligomphus acinaces. Humeral stripe is absent. Laterally there are two broad yellow stripes separated by a broad black stripe, with a yellow spot at its upper part. Abdomen is black, marked with bright citron-yellow. Segment 1 has a triangular apical spot on the dorsum and a large apico-lateral spot. Segment 2 has a dorsal longitudinal stripe, broader at the center. Segment 3 has a large base-dorsal spot. Segments 4 to 6 have two dorsal triangular spots situated close to the base. Segment 7 has yellow nearly the basal half. Segment 8 has basal spots on the sides. Segments 9 and 10 are unmarked. Anal appendages are black; but the outer and upper surfaces of the superiors are bright citron-yellow to nearly as far as the apices. The posterior two-thirds straight and the apical third curling strongly downwards and then backwards, so that its dorsum comes into contact with the dorsal surface of the inferior appendage. The inferior appendage is black, the branches curving at first downwards and then bent at a right angle and prolonged to overlap the superiors. Female is similar to the male.

It can be distinguished from Melligomphus acinaces by the shape of its anal appendages.

This species prefers shady mountain streams, settling on rocks or twigs in mid-stream.

== See also ==
- List of odonates of India
- List of odonata of Kerala
