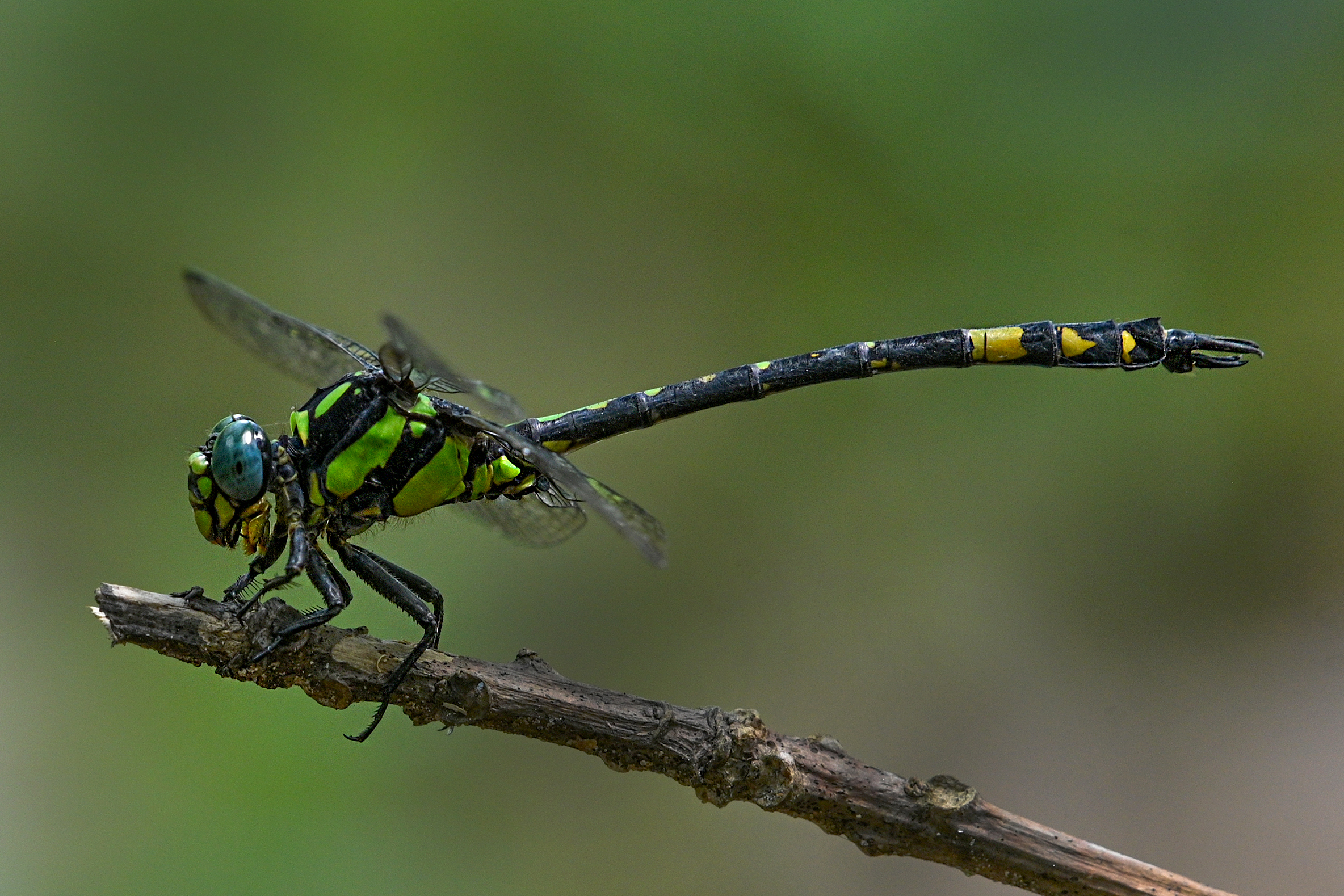
- Megalogomphus hannyngtoni

Scientific classification
- Domain: Eukaryota
- Kingdom: Animalia
- Phylum: Arthropoda
- Class: Insecta
- Order: Odonata
- Infraorder: Anisoptera
- Family: Gomphidae
- Genus: Megalogomphus; Campion, 1923

= Megalogomphus =

Genus of Asian Dragonflies

Megalogomphus is a genus of dragonflies belonging to the family Gomphidae.

The species of this genus are found in Southeastern Asia.

Species:

- Heterogomphus robustus Selys-Longchamps, 1854
- Heterogomphus smithii Selys-Longchamps, 1854
- Megalogomphus bicornutus Fraser, 1922
- Megalogomphus ceylonicus Laidlaw, 1922
- Megalogomphus cochinchinensis Selys, 1878
- Megalogomphus flavicolor Fraser, 1923
- Megalogomphus hannyngtoni Fraser, 1923
- Megalogomphus icterops Martin, 1902
- Megalogomphus junghuhni Lieftinck, 1934
- Megalogomphus smithii Selys, 1854
- Megalogomphus sommeri Selys, 1854
- Megalogomphus sumatranus Krüger, 1899
- Megalogomphus superbus Fraser, 1931
