= Pathrakadavu Waterfalls =

Waterfall in Kerala, India

Pathrakadavu waterfalls
- Pathrakadavu waterfalls
- Location: Palakkad, Kerala, India
- Type: Waterfalls

Pathrakadavu waterfalls is a waterfall situated in the Silent Valley National Park in Palakkad district, Kerala, India. This tourist place is situated in Kuruthichal in Pathrakadavu.

== Hydroelectric project and disputes ==
There was a proposal of an hydroelectric project in the river which this waterfall is located.that river is named as kundhi river There were so many agitations on the construction of hydroelectric project in the river by different environmental organisations and activists. Even the forest department protested against this.

== Ecotourism project ==
Now, the government is trying to implement an ecotourism project here that will not harm the environment and protect the beauty of nature in Silent valley.
