= Garcinia rubroechinata =

Conservation status
- Endangered (IUCN 3.1)

Scientific classification
- Kingdom: Plantae
- Clade: Tracheophytes
- Clade: Angiosperms
- Clade: Eudicots
- Clade: Rosids
- Order: Malpighiales
- Family: Clusiaceae
- Genus: Garcinia
- Species: G. rubroechinata

Binomial name
- Garcinia rubroechinata Kosterm.

Synonyms
- Garcinia echinocarpa var. monticola Maheshw.

Species of flowering plant

Garcinia rubroechinata, commonly known as malamkongu and sometimes known as Garcinia rubro-echinata, is a species of flowering plant in the family Clusiaceae. It is a tree which grows to 20 meters tall. It is found only in the Western Ghats of southern India.

Garcinia rubroechinata is known from four locations in the south Western Ghats of Kerala and Tamil Nadu states. Most of the species' range is in Agasthyamalai Biosphere Reserve (Tirunelveli and Thiruvananthapuram districts) and the Wayanad forests. Based on collections, the species' estimated extent of occurrence (EOO) is 1,272 km^{2} and estimated area of occupancy (AOO) of 16 km^{2} are small, but may be under-estimates.

It grows in evergreen submontane and montane rain forests, from 850 to 1,850 metres elevation.

The species is assessed as Endangered, given its small estimated population – 200 to 250 mature individual trees, with 50 or fewer mature trees in each of the four known subpopulations.
