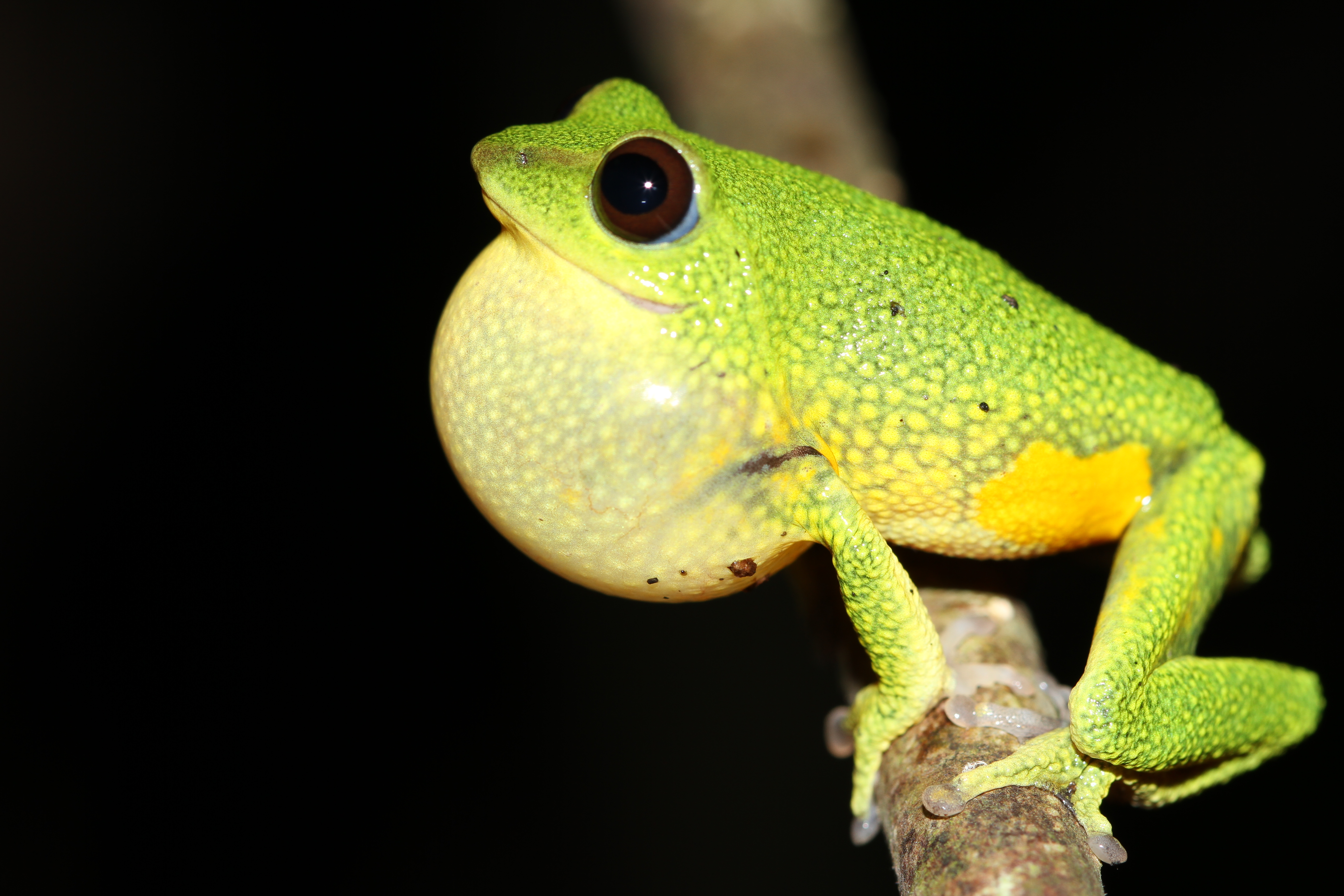

Conservation status
- Near Threatened (IUCN 3.1)

Scientific classification
- Kingdom: Animalia
- Phylum: Chordata
- Class: Amphibia
- Order: Anura
- Family: Rhacophoridae
- Genus: Raorchestes
- Species: R. silentvalley

Binomial name
- Raorchestes silentvalley Zachariah et al., 2016

= Raorchestes silentvalley =

Species of amphibian

Raorchestes silentvalley or Silent Valley bushfrog is a species of tree frog endemic to the Nilgiri Hills of southern India and belongs to the species-rich Asian genus Raorchestes. The species was described in June, 2016 and has been found to have a very restricted distribution on the southwestern slopes of the Nilgiri Hills in the Silent Valley National Park. This frog has been observed 2100 meters above sea level in Silent Valley National Park.

The species was described from the southern edge of the Nilgiris in the Silent Valley region. They are variable in colour but are green above with patterns of black blotches and spots. Scientists found one adult male frog that measured 26.9 mm in snout-vent length. The skin of its back was green and the skin of its belly was yellow. There were purple-black spots near the legs. Different frogs can have different marks. There is no webbed skin on the front feet and some webbed skin on the back feet. The underside is yellow with black or purple spots and streaks. The toe-pads are purplish. They have a distinct advertisement call given from tree perches at about 2 metres above the ground.

This frog has been observed in wet montane forests, perched on saplings or woody plants in the understory between 1,850 and 2,200 meters above sea level.

Like other frogs in Raorchestes, this frog breeds through direct development with no free-swimming tadpole stage.

The IUCN classifies this frog as near threatened because, although it has only been observed in two places, both those places are a protected park: Silent Valley National Park and Mukurthi National Park. If the status of its habitat were to change, the IUCN would immediately reclassify it.
