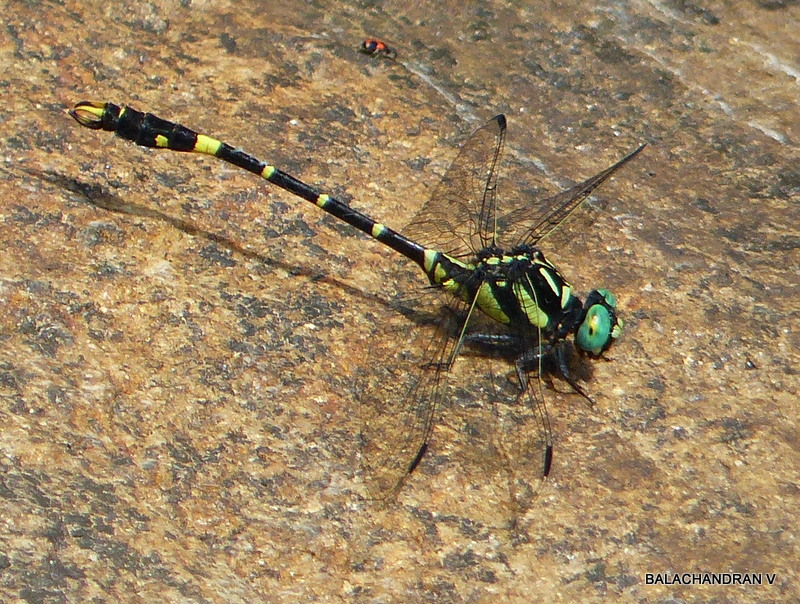
- Male

Conservation status
- Data Deficient (IUCN 3.1)

Scientific classification
- Kingdom: Animalia
- Phylum: Arthropoda
- Class: Insecta
- Order: Odonata
- Infraorder: Anisoptera
- Family: Gomphidae
- Genus: Melligomphus
- Species: M. acinaces

Binomial name
- Melligomphus acinaces (Laidlaw, 1922)

Synonyms
- Onychogomphus acinaces Laidlaw, 1922

= Melligomphus acinaces =

Species of dragonfly

Melligomphus acinaces is a species of dragonfly in the family Gomphidae. It is endemic to the streams of Western Ghats of India. This species was originally described as a Onychogomphus. However, both the pattern and the shape of the anal appendages do not fit Onychogomphus but are very close to those of the species placed in Melligomphus.

== Description and habitat ==
It is a medium-sized dragonfly with bottle-green eyes. Its thorax black, marked with greenish-yellow. There is a mesothoracic collar and an oblique ante-humeral stripe. The sides are greenish-yellow with a broad median black stripe on each side. The abdomen is black, marked with greenish-yellow. Segment 1 has an apical triangular spot, and an apical lateral spot. Segment 2 has two large yellow lateral spots. Segment 3 has a large basal spot. Segments 4 to 6 have smaller spots. Segment 7 has its basal half yellow. Segment 8 has only a basal spot on the sides. Segments 9 and 10 are unmarked. Anal appendages are black. Superior appendages have the upper and outer surfaces bright yellow. They truncate, tapering sinuously backwards and sloping slightly downwards towards the apices. The inferior appendage is slightly longer, divided into two closely parallel branches and the distal halves curved upwards. It can be distinguished from all other species of this genus by the shape of the anal appendages.

It is commonly found in shallow mountain streams. It breeds in deep pools in those streams.

== See also ==
- List of odonates of India
- List of odonata of Kerala
