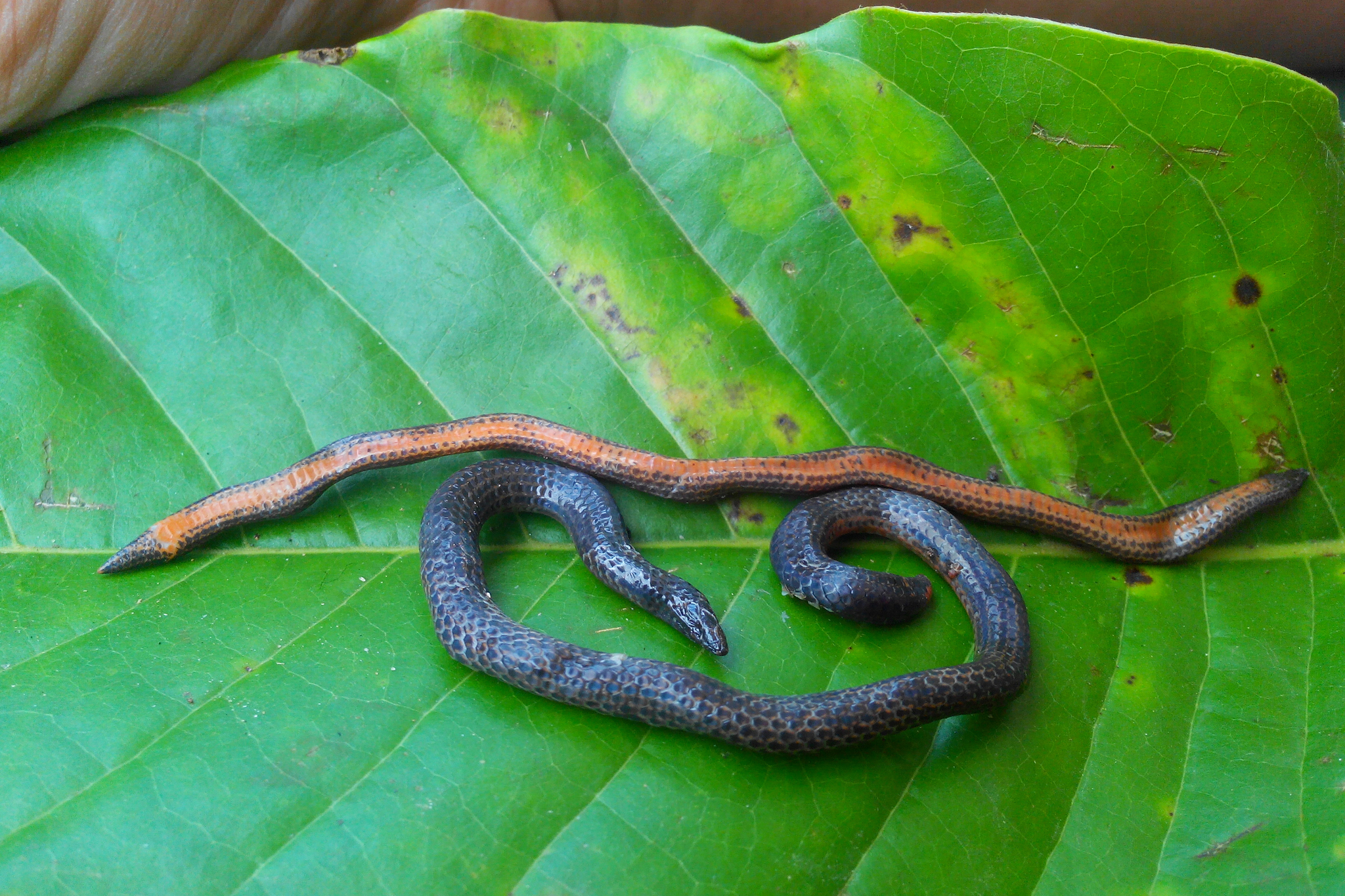
- Teretrurus hewstoni

Scientific classification
- Domain: Eukaryota
- Kingdom: Animalia
- Phylum: Chordata
- Class: Reptilia
- Order: Squamata
- Suborder: Serpentes
- Family: Uropeltidae
- Genus: Teretrurus; Beddome, 1886

Synonyms
- Brachyophidium

= Teretrurus =

Genus of snakes

Teretrurus is a genus of nonvenomous shield-tail snakes which are endemic to the central and southern Western Ghats of India. Currently, eight species are recognized.

== Species ==
- Teretrurus agumbens Cyriac, Ganesh, Madani, Ghosh, Kulkarni & Shanker, 2024 - found in Agumbe
- Teretrurus albiventer Cyriac, Ganesh, Madani, Ghosh, Kulkarni & Shanker, 2024 - found in the Peppara Wildlife Sanctuary
- Teretrurus hewstoni (Beddome, 1876) - found in the Wayanad Range of the Western Ghats
- Teretrurus periyarensis Cyriac, Ganesh, Madani, Ghosh, Kulkarni & Shanker, 2024 - found in Periyar National Park
- Teretrurus rhodogaster Wall, 1921 – Wall's shield-tail snake, Palni Mountain burrowing snake, red-bellied shield-tail snake - occurs in southern India in the Western Ghats encompassing the Palni Hills
- Teretrurus sanguineus (Beddome, 1867) – purple-red earth snake - occurs in southern India in the Manimuthar Hills and Nyamakad
- Teretrurus siruvaniensis Cyriac, Ganesh, Madani, Ghosh, Kulkarni & Shanker, 2024 - found in Siruvani Hills
- Teretrurus travancoricus (Beddome, 1886) – Travancore earth snake, found in the southern Western Ghats south of Shengottai Gap
