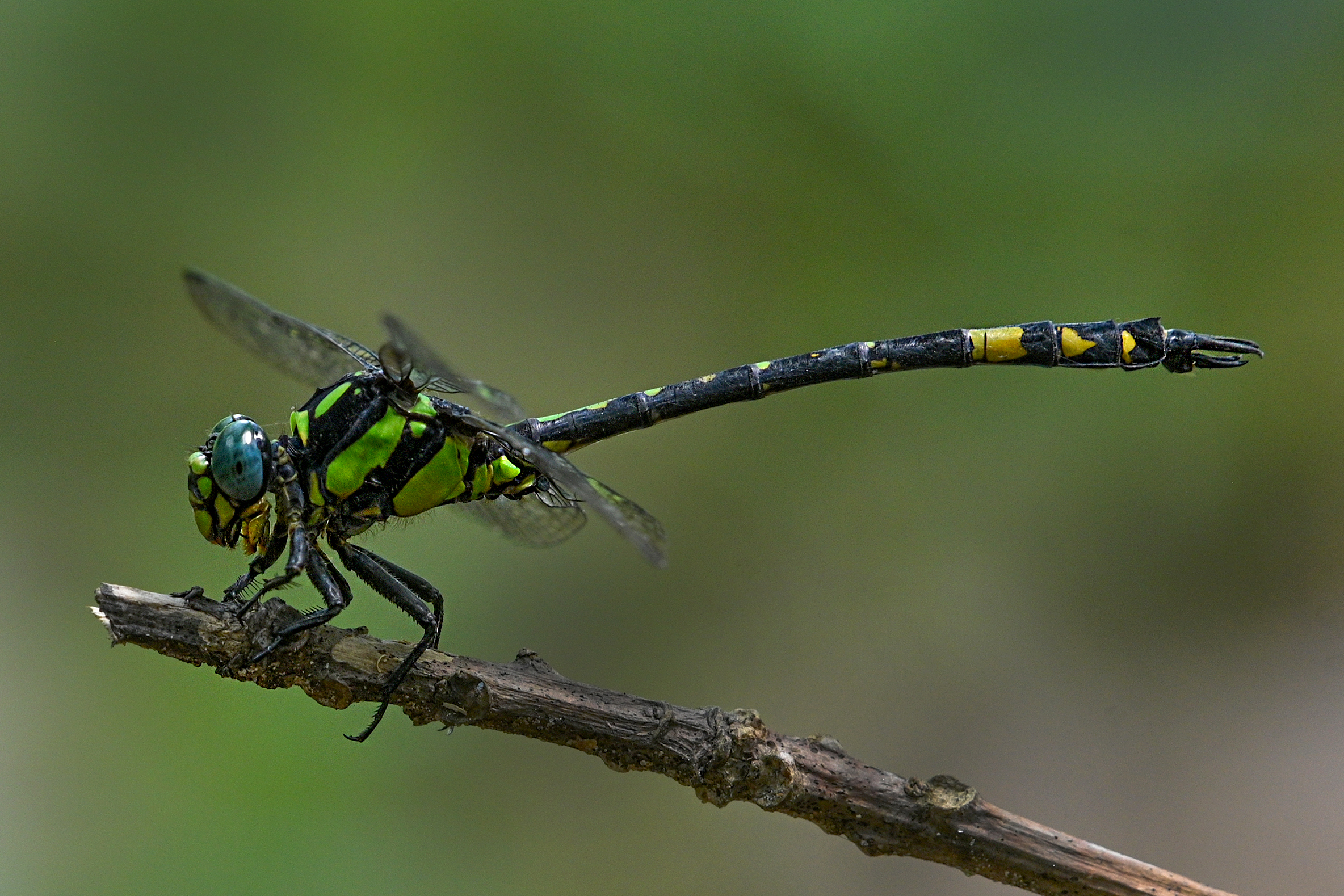
- Male

Conservation status
- Near Threatened (IUCN 3.1)

Scientific classification
- Kingdom: Animalia
- Phylum: Arthropoda
- Class: Insecta
- Order: Odonata
- Infraorder: Anisoptera
- Family: Gomphidae
- Genus: Megalogomphus
- Species: M. hannyngtoni

Binomial name
- Megalogomphus hannyngtoni (Fraser, 1923)

Synonyms
- Heterogomphus hannyngtoni Fraser, 1923

= Megalogomphus hannyngtoni =

Species of dragonfly

Megalogomphus hannyngtoni, is a species of dragonfly in the family Gomphidae. It is known only from the Western Ghats of India.

== Description and habitat ==
It is a large dragonfly with bottle-green eyes. Its thorax is black; marked with bright greenish-yellow stripes. Abdomen is black, marked with bright citron-yellow. Segment 1 has a small apical dorsal triangle and the whole of the sides. Segment 2 has a dorsal and a lateral stripe, broad at the base. Segment 3 has a dorsal stripe and a lateral wedge-shaped spot at the base. Segments 4 and 5 have a chain of three dorsal spots. Segment 6 has a single baso-dorsal spo. Segment 7 has more than the basal half yellow. Segments 8 and 9 have small lateral basal triangular spots. Segment 10 is entirely black. Anal appendages are black.

This species is found in forested mountain streams and patrol the banks. They usually perch on overhanging twigs and rarely on rocks in hill streams. It breeds in fast flowing hill streams.

== See also ==
- List of odonates of India
- List of odonata of Kerala
