= Teretrurus rhodogaster =

Conservation status
- Least Concern (IUCN 3.1)

Scientific classification
- Kingdom: Animalia
- Phylum: Chordata
- Class: Reptilia
- Order: Squamata
- Suborder: Serpentes
- Family: Uropeltidae
- Genus: Teretrurus
- Species: T. rhodogaster

Binomial name
- Teretrurus rhodogaster Wall, 1921

Synonyms
- Teretrurus rhodogaster M.A. Smith, 1943; Brachyophidium rhodogaster Rajendran, 1985

Species of snake

Teretrurus rhodogaster is a species of nonvenomous shield-tail snake, endemic to the Western Ghats of India. It is known as Wall's shield-tail snake, Palni Mountain burrowing snake, or red-bellied shield-tail snake.

It is perhaps the smallest species of shield-tail snake, with adults barely exceeding 5–6 in (130–150 mm).

== Geographic range ==
It is found in South India, in the Western Ghats encompassing the Palni Hills (Shembaganur in Kodaikanal Hills, Palnis).

The type locality given is "Palnai Hills".
