= Actinodaphne lanata =

Conservation status
- Vulnerable (IUCN 3.1)

Scientific classification
- Kingdom: Plantae
- Clade: Tracheophytes
- Clade: Angiosperms
- Clade: Magnoliids
- Order: Laurales
- Family: Lauraceae
- Genus: Actinodaphne
- Species: A. lanata

Binomial name
- Actinodaphne lanata Meisn.

Synonyms
- Iozoste lanata (Meisn.) Kuntze

Species of flowering plant

Actinodaphne lanata is a species of plant in the family Lauraceae. It is endemic to the Nilgiris of Tamil Nadu state in southern India. It is a small tree which grows up to 6 metres tall. It grows in montane shola forests from 1,800 to 2,200 metres elevation.

The species was described by Carl Meissner in 1864.
