= Iris barbatula =

Scientific classification
- Kingdom: Plantae
- Clade: Tracheophytes
- Clade: Angiosperms
- Clade: Monocots
- Order: Asparagales
- Family: Iridaceae
- Genus: Iris
- Subgenus: Iris subg. Nepalensis
- Species: I. barbatula

Binomial name
- Iris barbatula Noltie & K.Y.Guan

Synonyms
- Junopsis barbatula (Noltie & K.Y.Guan) M.B.Crespo, Mart.-Azorín & Mavrodiev

Species of flowering plant

Iris barbatula is a species of flowering plant native to Yunnan, China.
