= Iris latistyla =

Scientific classification
- Kingdom: Plantae
- Clade: Tracheophytes
- Clade: Angiosperms
- Clade: Monocots
- Order: Asparagales
- Family: Iridaceae
- Genus: Iris
- Subgenus: Iris subg. Limniris
- Section: Iris sect. Lophiris
- Species: I. latistyla

Binomial name
- Iris latistyla Y. T. Zhao

Synonyms
- None known

Species of flowering plant

Iris latistyla is a plant species in the genus Iris, it is also in the subgenus Limniris and in the section 'Lophiris section, although it was thought to be listed within Iris subg. Nepalensis in some sources. It is a rhizomatous perennial, from Tibet and China, with violet or blue-purple flowers. It is cultivated as an ornamental plant in temperate regions.

== Description ==
It has short, rhizomes, that have the tan or brown, fibrous remains of past years leaves. Below the rhizome are pale brown, thick, fleshy-like roots.

It has narrow, linear, grey-green or pale green leaves, that grow up to 15–25 cm (6–10 in) long and 2–3 mm wide. The leaves taper to a point. The leaves have 2–3 longitudinal veins.

It has simple flowering stem, that grow up to 6–14 cm (2–6 in) long and 2 mm wide. The stems can have 1 branch.

The stems have 3 spathes (leaves of the flower bud), that are green, narrow, lanceolate, they end in a point (acuminate) and 2.5–4.5 cm (1–2 in) long and 6–8 mm wide.

The stem (and branch) hold between 1 and 2 flowers, which bloom between May and June.

The flowers are 5 cm (2 in) in diameter, and come in shades of violet, or blue purple.

It has 2 pairs of petals, 3 large sepals (outer petals), known as the 'falls' and 3 inner, smaller petals (or tepals), known as the 'standards'. The falls are obovate, and are 3.5–4 cm (1–2 in) long and 1.5 cm wide. In the middle of the falls, is a serrated, crest surrounded by blue and white stripes or blotches. The petals are curved toward centre of flower. The claw (part of the petal closest to the stem) is similar to a gutter. The standards are narrowly, ovate or broadly lanceolate, and are 3.5 cm (1 in) long and 1.5 cm wide.

It has broad or flat and wide, style branches, which are 4 cm (2 in) long and 1.5 cm wide. It has wide lobes on the end and have toothed edges. They arch up towards the centre of the flower.

After the iris has flowered, it produces a seed capsule, between July and September. The seeds have not been described.

== Taxonomy ==
It has the common name of wide-style iris, or wide coloumn iris.

It is written as 宽柱鸢尾 in Chinese script and known as kuan zhu yuan wei in Pidgin Chinese.

The Latin specific epithet latistyla refers to a combination of 2 words, lati from 'latus' meaning broad and wide and style.

It was first published and described by Yu Tang Zhao in 'Acta Phytotaxonomica Sinica' (Acta Phytotax. Sin. in Beijing) Vol.18 Issue1 page61 in 1980.

In 1980, Zhao originally placed this species among the crested irises in the Lophiris section, but Brian Mathew and Henry J. Noltie included it with Iris subg. Nepalensis, as it is very similar to Iris decora. Due to the iris being found in China, it is more likely to be a Lophiris crested iris, but a molecular study has supported a position within Iris subg. Nepalensis.

It was verified by United States Department of Agriculture Agricultural Research Service on 4 April 2003, and then updated on 29 September 2008.

== Distribution and habitat ==
It is native temperate areas of Asia.

=== Range ===
It has been found in Tibet. It has also been found in Chinese province of Xizang.

=== Habitat ===
It grows in forest margins and in grasslands near paddy fields.

It grows at altitudes of between 2,800 to 4,000 m (9,200 to 13,100 ft) above sea level.

It has been found in the semi-humid region of the Brahmaputra River valley, within forests, by forest edges and on valley terraces.

== Sources ==
- Mathew, B. 1981. The Iris. 202.
- Waddick, J. W. & Zhao Yu-tang. 1992. Iris of China.
