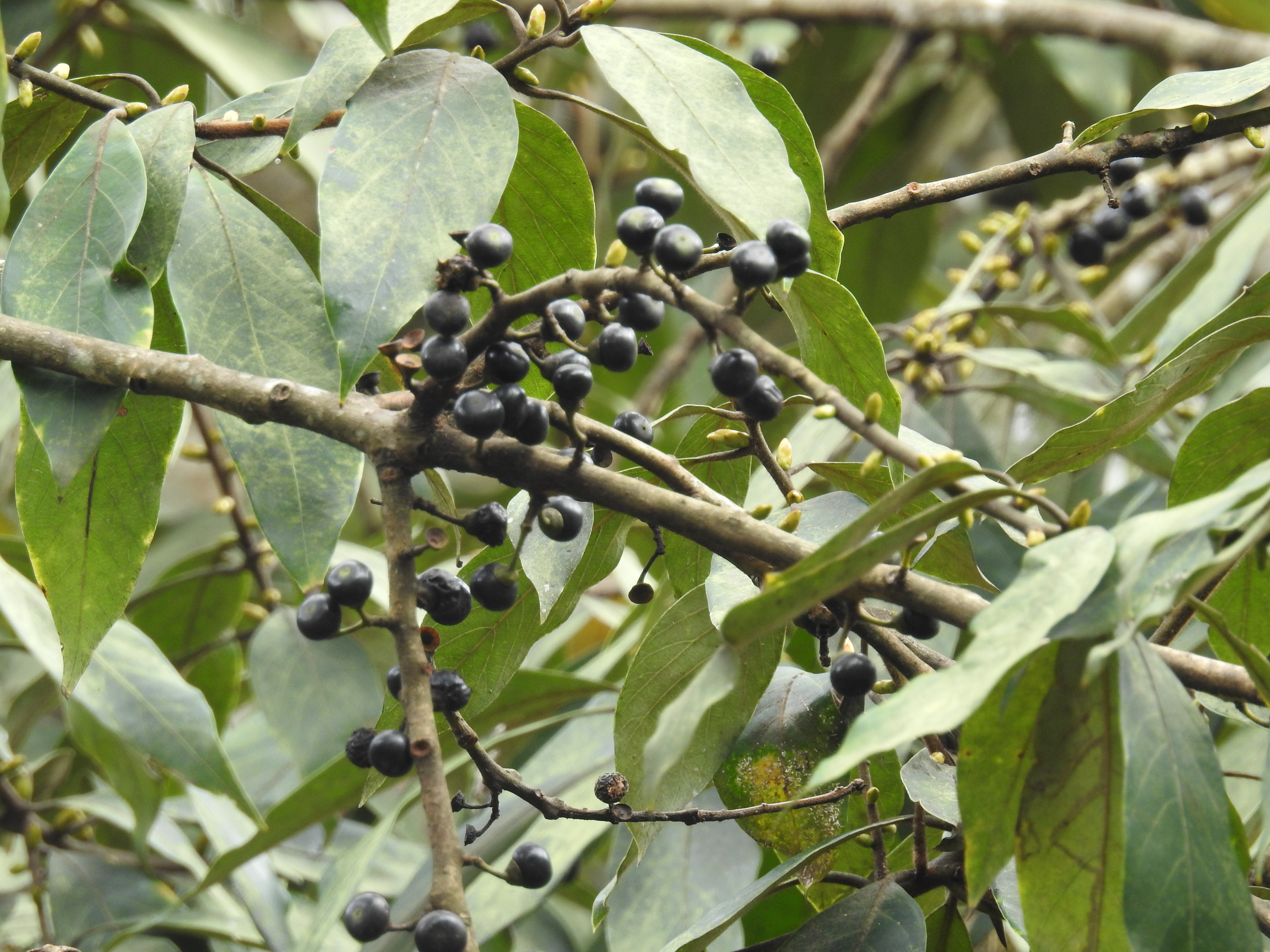

Conservation status
- Least Concern (IUCN 3.1)

Scientific classification
- Kingdom: Plantae
- Clade: Tracheophytes
- Clade: Angiosperms
- Clade: Magnoliids
- Order: Laurales
- Family: Lauraceae
- Genus: Actinodaphne
- Species: A. wightiana

Binomial name
- Actinodaphne wightiana (Kuntze) Noltie

Synonyms
- Iozoste wightiana Kuntze (1891); Actinodaphne hirsuta Hook.f. (1886); Actinodaphne malabarica N.P.Balakr. (1967)

= Actinodaphne wightiana =

Species of flowering plant

Actinodaphne wightiana is a species of tree in the laurel family, Lauraceae. It native to the southern Western Ghats of Karnataka, Kerala and Tamil Nadu states in southwestern India. Its leaves are densely hirsute to tomentellous beneath and its fruits are 7–10 mm (0.28–0.39 in) in diameter. It grows in evergreen tropical moist forests from 100 to 1,000 metres elevation. It is threatened with habitat loss from deforestation to expand agriculture and plantations. The IUCN Red List assesses the species as Least Concern.

The species was first described as Iozoste wightiana by Otto Kuntze in 1891. In 2005 Henry Noltie placed the species in genus Actinodaphne as A. wightiana.
