= Actinodaphne bourneae =

Conservation status
- Vulnerable (IUCN 3.1)

Scientific classification
- Kingdom: Plantae
- Clade: Tracheophytes
- Clade: Angiosperms
- Clade: Magnoliids
- Order: Laurales
- Family: Lauraceae
- Genus: Actinodaphne
- Species: A. bourneae

Binomial name
- Actinodaphne bourneae Gamble

Species of flowering plant

Actinodaphne bourneae is a species of flowering plant in the family Lauraceae. It is a tree which grows up to 12 metres tall that is endemic to the Western Ghats of Kerala and Tamil Nadu in southwestern India. It grows in Shola forest from 1,800 to 2,400 metres elevation. It is threatened by habitat loss.
