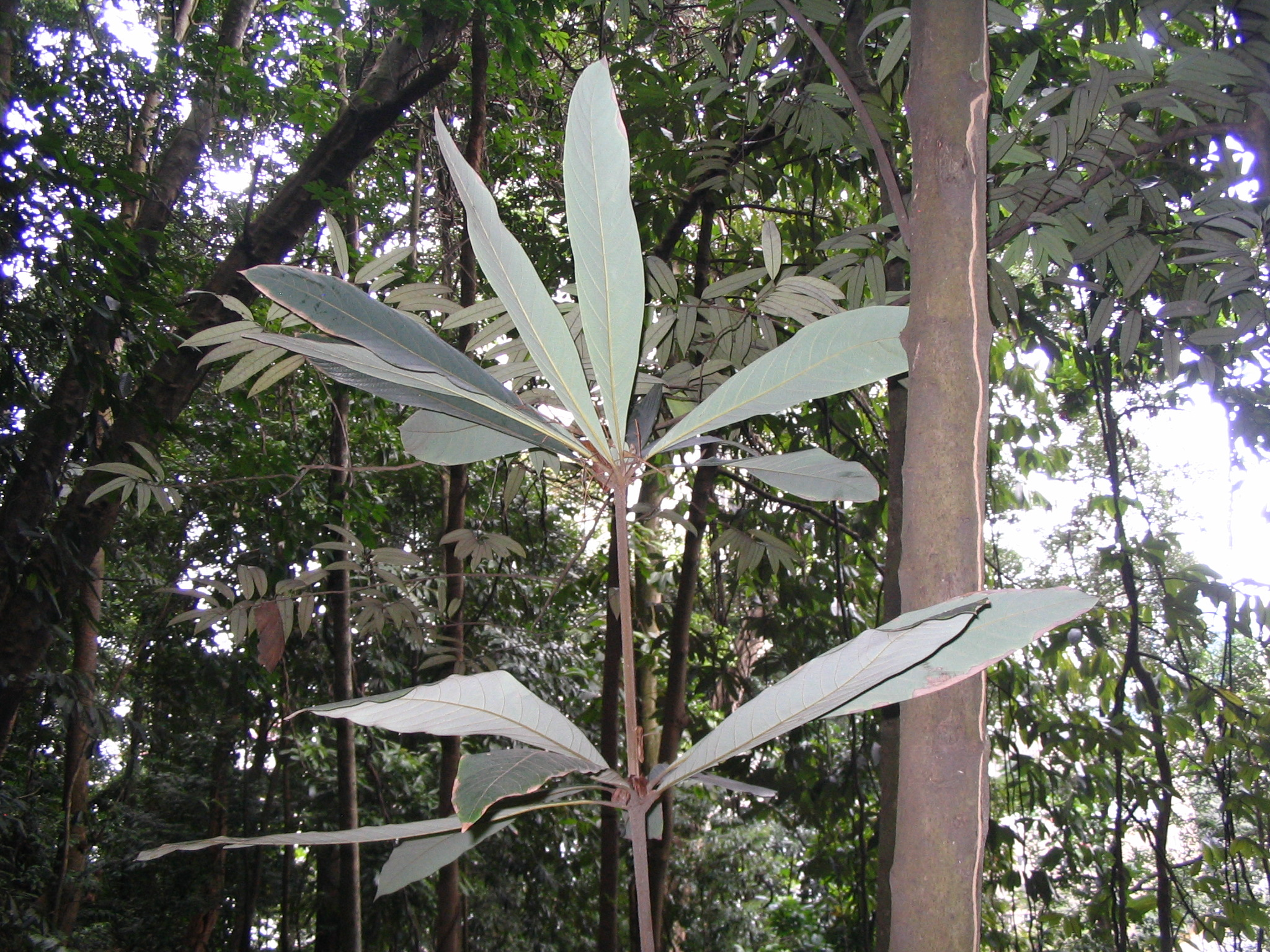

Conservation status
- Least Concern (IUCN 2.3)

Scientific classification
- Kingdom: Plantae
- Clade: Embryophytes
- Clade: Tracheophytes
- Clade: Angiosperms
- Clade: Magnoliids
- Order: Laurales
- Family: Lauraceae
- Genus: Actinodaphne
- Species: A. malaccensis

Binomial name
- Actinodaphne malaccensis Hook.f.

Synonyms
- Actinodaphne hullettii Gamble; Iozoste malaccensis Kuntze

= Actinodaphne malaccensis =

Species of tree

Actinodaphne malaccensis is a species of tree in the laurel family, Lauraceae. It is native to Peninsular Malaysia and Singapore. It is used for timber.
