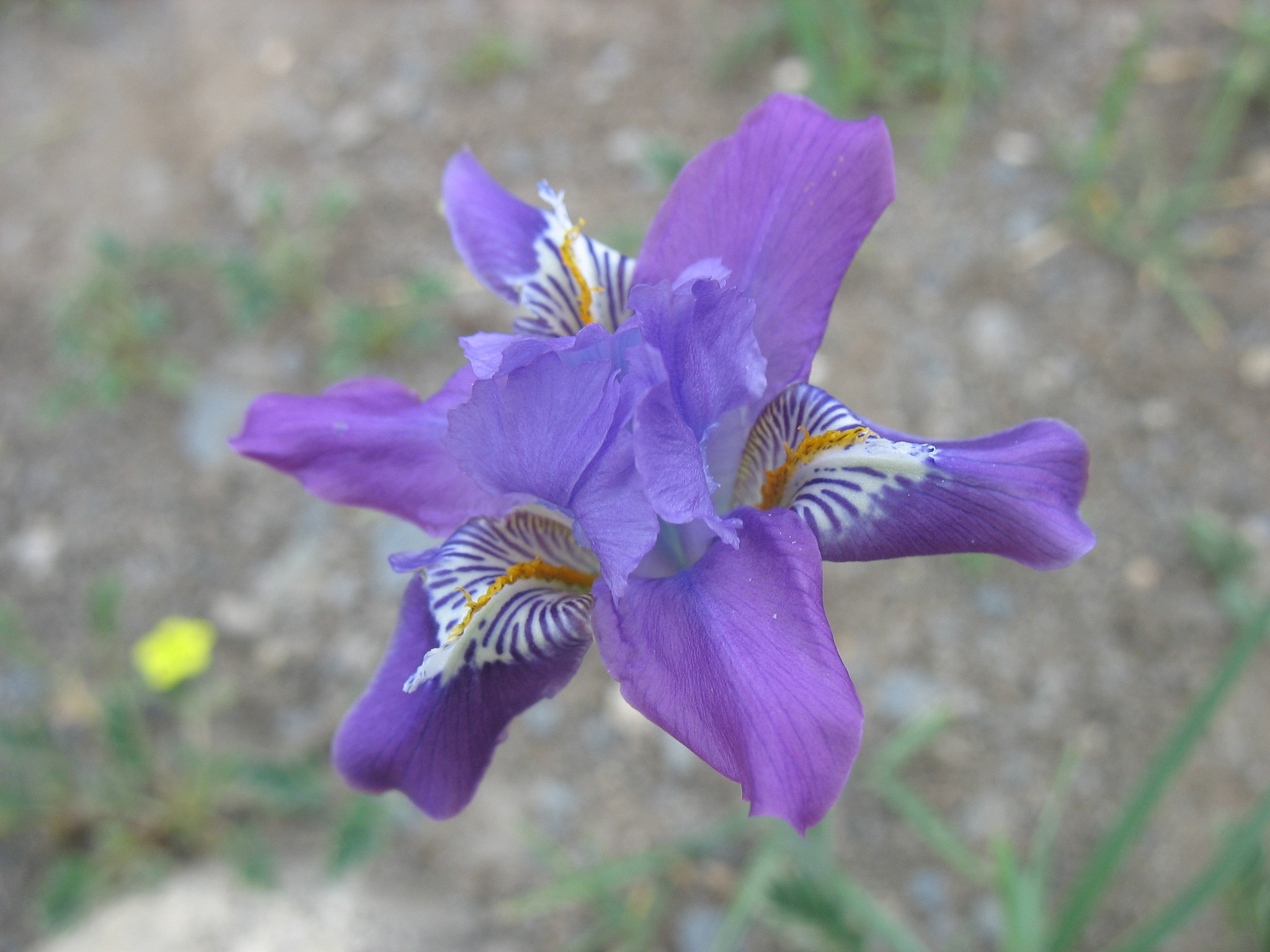

Scientific classification
- Kingdom: Plantae
- Clade: Tracheophytes
- Clade: Angiosperms
- Clade: Monocots
- Order: Asparagales
- Family: Iridaceae
- Genus: Iris
- Subgenus: Iris subg. Nepalensis; Lawr.

= Iris subg. Nepalensis =

Subgenus of flowering plants

Iris subg. Nepalensis is one subgenus of Iris, also known as 'Himalayan irises'. It was formerly genus Junopsis.

The irises have fleshy-like roots very similar to a day lily (Hemerocallis). They are best grown in a semi-shady spot in a bulb frame. Most bulbs in the subgenus are found in the Himalayas and Yunnan region.

Only four species are known.

- Iris decora Wall.
- Iris colletti Hook.
- Iris staintonii H Hara
- Iris barbatula Noltie & K.Y.Guan

== Iris decora ==
This is the most known of the species.

It has many synonyms: Evansia nepalensis (Klatt), Iris nepalensis (D.Don), Iris nepalensis var. khasiana (Baker), Iris sulcata (Wall.), Iris yunnanensis (H.Lév.), Junopsis decora (Wall.) Wern.Schulze, Neubeckia decora (Wall.) Klatt and Neubeckia sulcata (Klatt)

It was first published in British Flower Garden Series 2, in 1829. It was first described by Nathaniel Wallich in his book Plantae Asiaticae Rariores in 1830. It was later published in then Journal of the Royal Horticultural Society in 1969.

It is hardy to USDA Zone 3. It also requires frequent watering while in growth.

Sometimes it is confused with Iris leptophylla (in Iris subg. Scorpiris).

It has a rhizome covered in bristly fibres. It is similar in form to the roots of Hemerocallis. It reaches a height of 10–30 cm tall.

It has 3–7 flowers per stem, in the summer, June in the UK. which are approximately 4–5 cm in diameter. They come in a range of colours between pale bluish lavender and deep reddish purple. The perianth tube measures 3.5–5 cm. The falls are up to 3.5 cm long. The blade has an orange-yellow central ridge that becomes white or purple at the apex. It has a whitish claw with purple veins.

The leaves reach up to 30 cm at flowering time and then grow up to 45–60 cm tall later, growing to longer than the flowering stem. The strongly ribbed leaves can be 2–8 mm wide.

Iris decora was found in 1832 on grassy hillsides on plateaus, open stony pastures, and cliffs at 2800–3100 m above sea level. It can be found in the Himalayas from Kashmir to China. In Sichuan, Xizang (Tibet), Yunnan, Bhutan, N India and Nepal of the Western Central Himalayas.

A white-flowered form from Yunnan region has been described as Iris decora var. leucantha by D. Dong & Y. T. Zhao (Bull. Bot. Res., Harbin 18: 150.) in 1998.

== Iris colletti ==
It was found in 1909, in North Burma, Thailand, Tibet and the province of Yunnan and Sichuan (in China).

It was named after Sir Henry Collett (1836–1901), who collected plants in most of those regions.

It has been found growing in various habitats, including wood edges, clearings, shrubby areas, and sunny grasslands.

It can grow at altitudes of up to 3400 m above sea level.

It has 3–7 lilac-blue flowers on a 5–15 cm tall stem. The flower has a very long neck, similar to a crocus. It generally flowers in May – June. The flower has an orange caterpillar-like beard on the midrib. It also has ribbed, grey-green leaves which extend after blooming up to 10–20 cm (3.9–7.9 in).

Two hybrids have been found: Iris collettii var. collettii and Iris collettii var. acaulis. Iris collettii var. acaulis (Noltie) was described in New Plantsman (magazine) in 1995. It was found at 2,200–3,700 metres (7,200–12,100 ft) above sea level, in the provinces of Sichuan and Yunnan in China.

== Iris staintonii ==
Originally found in 1974 in Nepal. It normally has a single mauve flower (about 3 cm) with bearded fall and is marked with white. It is deemed a rare plant in Nepal. It was first published by Kanesuke Hara in Journal of Japanese Botany in 1974.

It was given to Kew Gardens by an Oxford University team in 1992. Other mentions.

- Hara, H. et al. 1978–1982. An enumeration of the flowering plants of Nepal.
- Mathew, B. 1981. The Iris. 134.

== Iris barbatula ==
A recent discovery, it was described by Henry John Noltie and K.Y.Guan in 1995 in the New Plantsman 2: 137, and was collected from N.W. Yunnan. It has been found in open grassy areas and forest clearings, and found on grassy plateaus at 2,400–3,600 metres (7,900–11,800 ft) above sea level. It has three long-tubed purple to dark-violet flowers, which are about 5 cm across, and has a short subterranean stem. Unusually, it also has a fimbriate (fringed), almost beard-like crest. It flowers between May and July. It has leaves that grow 9–19 cm tall and 2–5 mm wide. It tends to form small clumps of bulbs after several years.
