= Actinodaphne stenophylla =

Conservation status
- Vulnerable (IUCN 3.1)

Scientific classification
- Kingdom: Plantae
- Clade: Tracheophytes
- Clade: Angiosperms
- Clade: Magnoliids
- Order: Laurales
- Family: Lauraceae
- Genus: Actinodaphne
- Species: A. stenophylla

Binomial name
- Actinodaphne stenophylla Thwaites

Synonyms
- Iozoste stenophylla (Thwaites) Kuntze; Actinodaphne thwaitesii Meisn.

Species of flowering plant

Actinodaphne stenophylla is a species of flowering plant in the family Lauraceae. It is a tree endemic to Sri Lanka. It grows in dry patana grassland and intermediate and montane forest subcanopy and understory.

The species was described by George Henry Kendrick Thwaites in 1861.
