= Henry Collett =

English soldier and botanist (1836–1901)

Sir Henry Collett (6 March 1836 – 21 December 1901) was an English soldier and botanist. He served as an army officer in the East India Company.

== Life ==
Collett was born in Thetford, Norfolk, the fourth son of Rev. W. Collett and his second wife Ellen Clarke née Bidwell, He studied at Tonbridge School and at Addiscombe Military Seminary. He joined the Bengal Army on 8 June 1855, rising through the ranks to become a lieutenant colonel in 1879. In the Second Anglo-Afghan War (1878–80) he acted as quartermaster general on the staff of Frederick Roberts, 1st Earl Roberts. He was promoted colonel in 1884, made KCB in 1891, and from 1892 to 1893 he commanded the Peshawar district with the rank of major-general. He retired from the army in 1893.

Collett was a keen botanist, an interest that he developed when posted in 1878 in the Kurram Valley. He studied and collected plants in Afghanistan, Algeria, Burma, the Canaries, Corsica, India, Java, and Spain. He was made a fellow of the Linnean Society of London in 1879. He was one of the founding members of the Simla Naturalists' Society. At his death he was working on a book on the flora of Simla, which was published posthumously as Flora Simlensis (1902).

His herbarium collection was presented to the Royal Botanic Gardens, Kew in London, England after his death. The plant species Iris collettii was named after him in 1909.
