= Actinodaphne fragilis =

Conservation status
- Endangered (IUCN 3.1)

Scientific classification
- Kingdom: Plantae
- Clade: Embryophytes
- Clade: Tracheophytes
- Clade: Angiosperms
- Clade: Magnoliids
- Order: Laurales
- Family: Lauraceae
- Genus: Actinodaphne
- Species: A. fragilis

Binomial name
- Actinodaphne fragilis Gamble

Species of tree

Actinodaphne fragilis is a species of plant in the family Lauraceae. It is a tree endemic to Peninsular Malaysia.
