= Actinodaphne menghaiensis =

Conservation status
- Critically Endangered (IUCN 3.1)

Scientific classification
- Kingdom: Plantae
- Clade: Tracheophytes
- Clade: Angiosperms
- Clade: Magnoliids
- Order: Laurales
- Family: Lauraceae
- Genus: Actinodaphne
- Species: A. menghaiensis

Binomial name
- Actinodaphne menghaiensis J.Li, 2005

Species of flowering plant

Actinodaphne menghaiensis is a species of tree belonging to the family Lauraceae. It is only known from Menghai County of southern Yunnan in south-central China.

This tree, growing to 8 m tall, is found in dense, humid tropical/subtropical montane forest at 1,500 metres elevation. Whorls of five or six leaves, up to 40 cm long, are borne at the ends of branchlets. It is very similar to Actinodaphne obovata but can be distinguished by the glabrous branchlets, leaves and buds; and smaller fruits with more slender pedicels.
