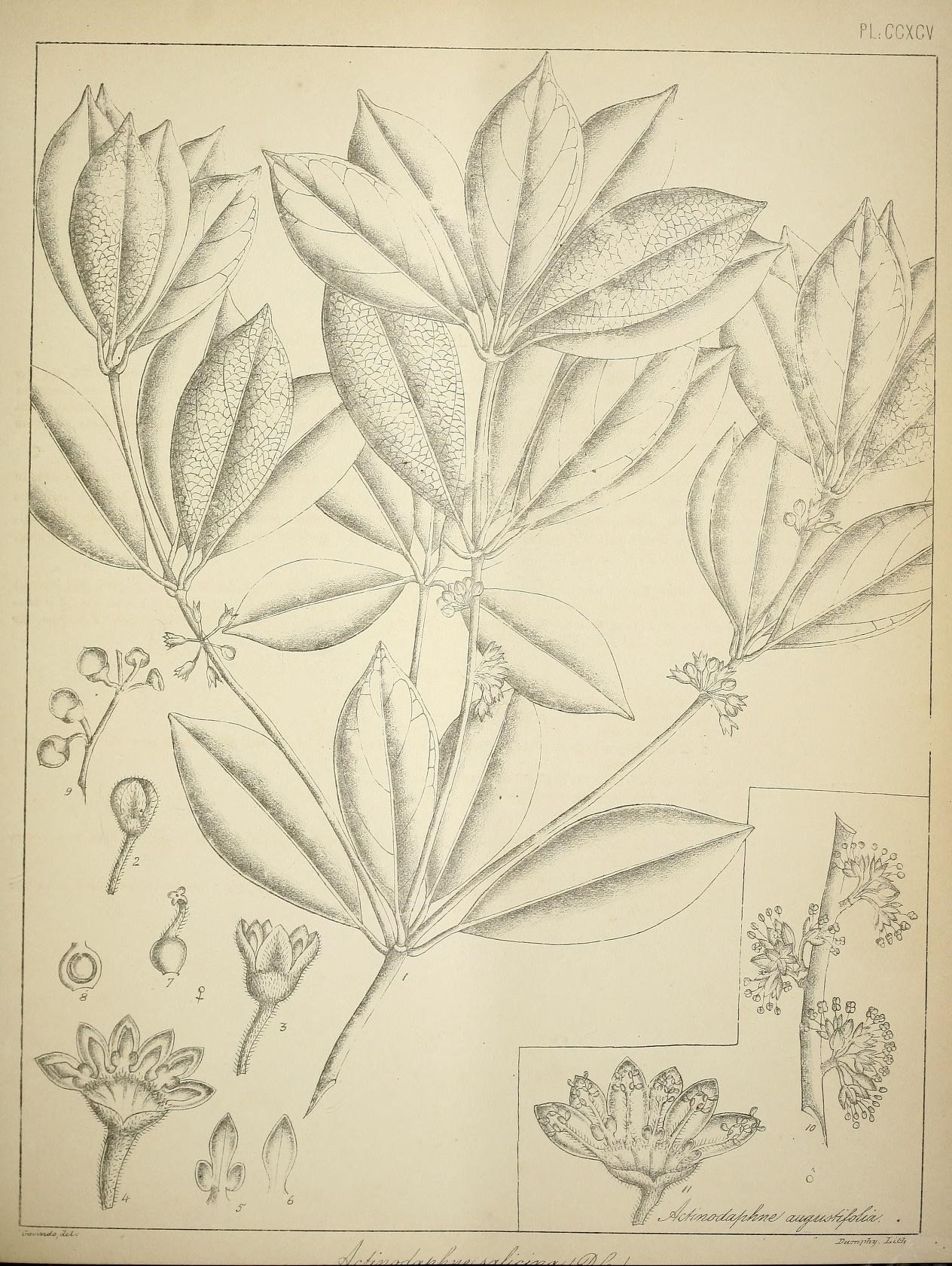
- Illustration of Actinodaphne salicina

Conservation status
- Endangered (IUCN 3.1)

Scientific classification
- Kingdom: Plantae
- Clade: Tracheophytes
- Clade: Angiosperms
- Clade: Magnoliids
- Order: Laurales
- Family: Lauraceae
- Genus: Actinodaphne
- Species: A. salicina

Binomial name
- Actinodaphne salicina Meisn.

Synonyms
- Iozoste salicina Kuntze

= Actinodaphne salicina =

Species of flowering plant

Actinodaphne salicina is a species of flowering plant in the family Lauraceae. It is a large shrub or small tree, which grows up to 6 metres tall, that is endemic to the Western Ghats of Kerala and Tamil Nadu states in southwestern India. It grows in montane evergreen rain forest from 1,200 to 1,800 metres elevation, where it is known from about five locations.

The species was first described by Carl Meissner in 1864.
