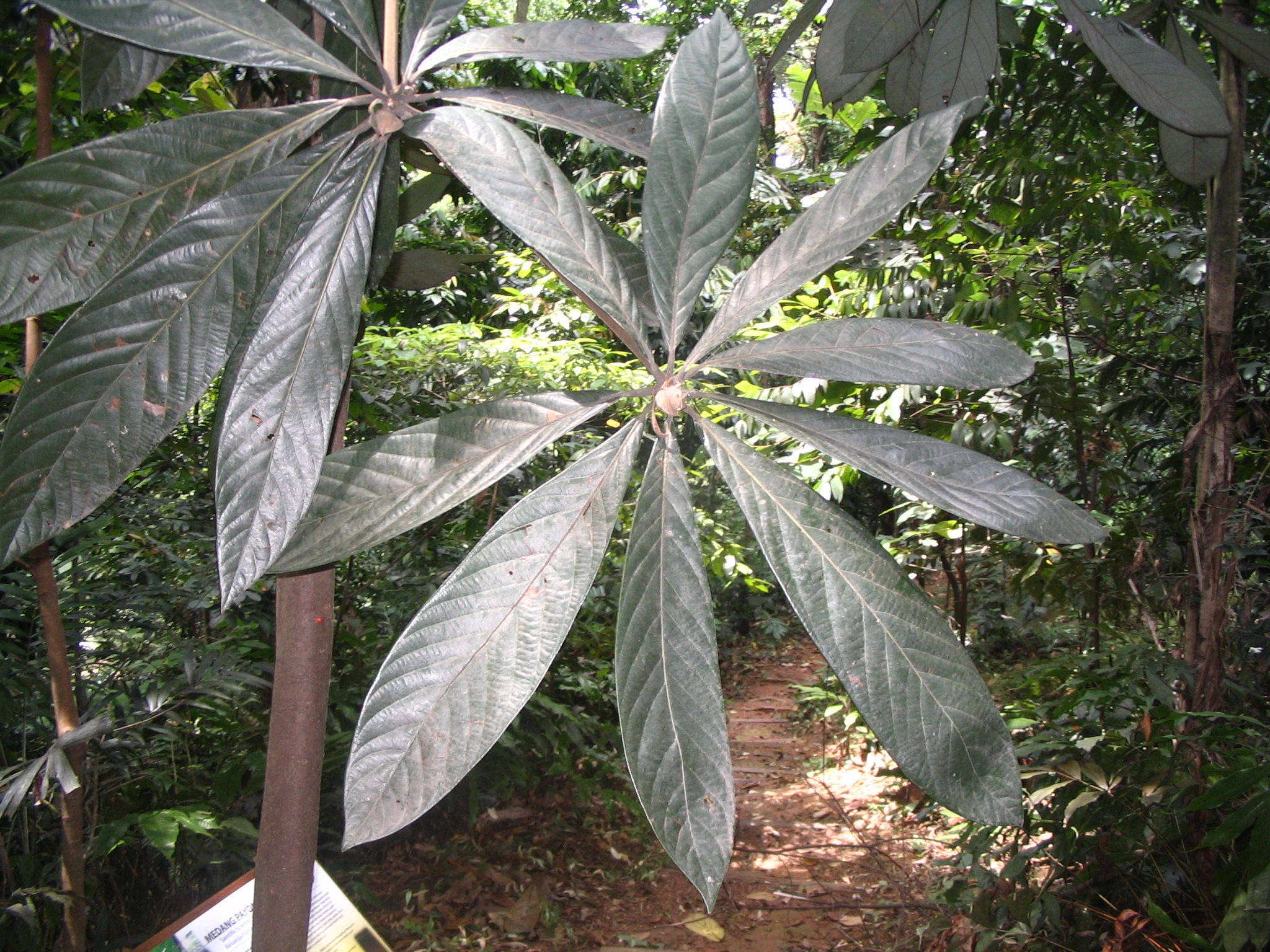
- Actinodaphne malaccensis

Scientific classification
- Kingdom: Plantae
- Clade: Tracheophytes
- Clade: Angiosperms
- Clade: Magnoliids
- Order: Laurales
- Family: Lauraceae
- Genus: Actinodaphne; Nees

Species
- See text

Synonyms
- Actinomorphe Kuntze

= Actinodaphne =

Genus of flowering plants

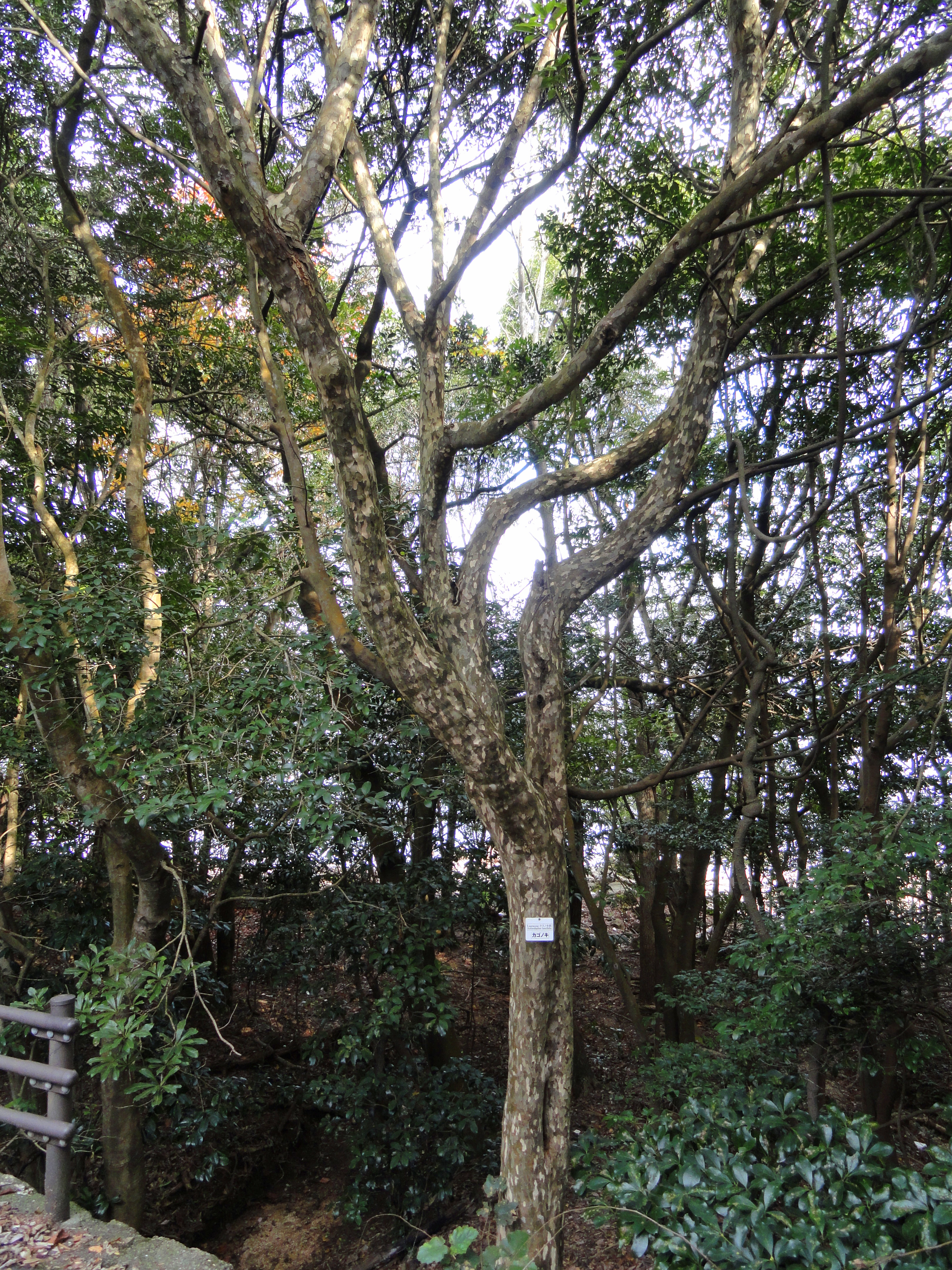
Actinodaphne lancifolia

Actinodaphne is an Asian genus of flowering plants in the laurel family (Lauraceae). It contains approximately 125 species of trees and shrubs.

The genus ranges across tropical and subtropical regions of South Asia, Southeast Asia, southern China, Japan, New Guinea, Solomon Islands, and Fiji. There are 17 Chinese species, 13 of which are endemic.

== Description ==
Plants in this genus are evergreen trees or shrubs 3 to 25 m tall, with leaves usually clustered or nearly verticillate, rarely alternate or opposite, unlobed, pinninerved, and rarely triplinerved.

They are dioecious, meaning that male and female flowers are borne on separate plants. The flowers are star-shaped, small, and greenish. The flowers are clustered or whorled and are unisexual. Umbels are solitary or clustered or arranged in a panicle or raceme; involucral bracts are imbricated and caducous. The perianth tube is short; perianth segments usually number six in two whorls of three each, nearly equal, and rarely persistent. The male flowers have fertile stamens usually 9 in three whorls of three each; filaments of the first and second whorls are eglandular, and of the third whorl are biglandular at the base; anthers are all introrse and four-celled; cells opening by lids; the rudimentary pistil is small or lacking. The female flowers has staminodes as many as stamens of male flowers; the ovary is superior; the stigma is shield-shaped or dilated. The fruit is a berry-like drupe seated on shallow or deep, cup-shaped or discoid, perianth tube. It has a small single seed dispersed mostly by birds.

== Ecology ==
Actinodaphne species require continuously moist soil, and do not tolerate drought and frost. The laurel trees fall within the broad-leaved forests; mid-montane deciduous forests; and high-montane mixed stunted forests. Some species grow in high-elevation forests at 1,500–3,300 m (4,900–10,800 ft).

== Species ==
As of September 2026, the following 124 species of Actinodaphne are accepted by Plants of the World Online:

- Actinodaphne acuminata (Blume) Meisn.
- Actinodaphne albifrons Kosterm.
- Actinodaphne amabilis Kosterm.
- Actinodaphne ambigua Hook.f.
- Actinodaphne angustifolia (Blume) Nees
- Actinodaphne apoensis (Elmer) Kosterm. ex Brambach & Pelser
- Actinodaphne archboldiana C.K.Allen
- Actinodaphne areolata Blume
- Actinodaphne bicolor (Merr.) Merr.
- Actinodaphne borneensis Meisn.
- Actinodaphne bourdillonii Gamble
- Actinodaphne bourneae Gamble
- Actinodaphne brassii C.K.Allen
- Actinodaphne caesia Teschner
- Actinodaphne cambodiana (Lecomte) de Kok
- Actinodaphne campanulata Hook.f.
- Actinodaphne candolleana (Thwaites) Meisn.
- Actinodaphne celebica Miq.
- Actinodaphne cinerea Elmer
- Actinodaphne concinna Ridl.
- Actinodaphne concolor Nees
- Actinodaphne corymbosa Blume
- Actinodaphne crassa Hand.-Mazz.
- Actinodaphne cupularis (Hemsl.) Gamble
- Actinodaphne diversifolia Merr.
- Actinodaphne dolichophylla (Merr.) Merr.
- Actinodaphne elegans Thwaites
- Actinodaphne ellipticibacca Kosterm.
- Actinodaphne engleriana Teschner
- Actinodaphne ferruginea H.Liu
- Actinodaphne forrestii (C.K.Allen) Kosterm.
- Actinodaphne fragilis Gamble
- Actinodaphne fuliginosa Airy Shaw
- Actinodaphne furfuracea Blume
- Actinodaphne glabra Blume
- Actinodaphne glauca Nees
- Actinodaphne glaucina C.K.Allen
- Actinodaphne glomerata (Blume) Nees
- Actinodaphne gracilis Miq.
- Actinodaphne henryi Gamble
- Actinodaphne hirsuta Blume
- Actinodaphne hypoleucophylla Hayata
- Actinodaphne intermedia (Elmer) Kosterm. ex Brambach & Pelser
- Actinodaphne javanica Miq.
- Actinodaphne johorensis Gamble
- Actinodaphne junghuhnii Stur
- Actinodaphne kinabaluensis Kosterm.
- Actinodaphne kontumi de Kok
- Actinodaphne koshepangii Chun ex Hung T.Chang
- Actinodaphne kostermansii S.Julia
- Actinodaphne kweichowensis Yen C.Yang & P.H.Huang
- Actinodaphne lambirensis Tagane, Yahara & N.Okabe
- Actinodaphne lanata Meisn.
- Actinodaphne lanceolata Dalzell & A.Gibson
- Actinodaphne latifolia Teschner
- Actinodaphne lawsonii Gamble
- Actinodaphne lecomtei C.K.Allen
- Actinodaphne ledermannii Teschner
- Actinodaphne longipes Kosterm.
- Actinodaphne macgregorii (Merr.) Kosterm.
- Actinodaphne macrophylla (Blume) Nees
- Actinodaphne macroptera Miq.
- Actinodaphne madraspatana Bedd. ex Hook.f.
- Actinodaphne malaccensis Hook.f.
- Actinodaphne mansonii M.Gangop.
- Actinodaphne menghaiensis J.Li
- Actinodaphne mollis Blume
- Actinodaphne molochina Nees
- Actinodaphne moluccana Blume
- Actinodaphne montana Gamble
- Actinodaphne moonii Thwaites
- Actinodaphne multiflora Benth.
- Actinodaphne mushaensis (Hayata) Hayata
- Actinodaphne myriantha Merr.
- Actinodaphne nitida Teschner
- Actinodaphne notabilis Doweld
- Actinodaphne novoguineensis Teschner
- Actinodaphne obovata (Nees) Blume
- Actinodaphne obscurinervia Yen C.Yang & P.H.Huang
- Actinodaphne obtusa Teschner
- Actinodaphne oleifolia Gamble
- Actinodaphne omeiensis (H.Liu) C.K.Allen
- Actinodaphne paotingensis Yen C.Yang & P.H.Huang
- Actinodaphne pauciflora Blume
- Actinodaphne pedunculata (Blume) Meisn.
- Actinodaphne percoriacea S.Julia
- Actinodaphne perglabra Kosterm.
- Actinodaphne perlucida C.K.Allen
- Actinodaphne pilosa (Lour.) Merr.
- Actinodaphne pisifera Hook.f.
- Actinodaphne procera Nees
- Actinodaphne pruinosa Nees
- Actinodaphne pubescens Blume
- Actinodaphne pulchra Teschner
- Actinodaphne quercina Blume
- Actinodaphne ramosii Brambach & Pelser
- Actinodaphne rehderiana (C.K.Allen) Kosterm. ex Dao
- Actinodaphne reticulata Meisn.
- Actinodaphne ridleyi Gamble
- Actinodaphne robusta S.Julia
- Actinodaphne rufescens Blume
- Actinodaphne rumphii Blume
- Actinodaphne salicina Meisn.
- Actinodaphne samarensis (Merr.) Merr.
- Actinodaphne scleroptera Miq.
- Actinodaphne semengohensis S.Julia
- Actinodaphne sesquipedalis Hook.f. & Thomson ex Meisn.
- Actinodaphne shendurunii Robi & Udayan
- Actinodaphne sikkimensis Meisn.
- Actinodaphne soepadmoi S.Julia
- Actinodaphne solomonensis C.K.Allen
- Actinodaphne spathulifolia S.Julia
- Actinodaphne speciosa Nees
- Actinodaphne stenophylla Thwaites
- Actinodaphne sulcata S.Julia
- Actinodaphne superba Boerl.
- Actinodaphne tadulingamii Gamble
- Actinodaphne tayabensis (Elmer) Merr.
- Actinodaphne tomentosa Teschner
- Actinodaphne tonkinensis Dao
- Actinodaphne trichocarpa C.K.Allen
- Actinodaphne tsaii Hu
- Actinodaphne venosa S.Julia
- Actinodaphne wightiana (Kuntze) Noltie

=== Formerly placed here ===
- Litsea ligustrina (Nees) Fern.-Vill. (as Actinodaphne quinqueflora (Dennst.) M.R.Almeida & S.M.Almeida – Bangladesh, southwestern India, Myanmar, northeastern Pakistan, Sri Lanka
