= Actinodaphne molochina =

Conservation status
- Endangered (IUCN 3.1)

Scientific classification
- Kingdom: Plantae
- Clade: Tracheophytes
- Clade: Angiosperms
- Clade: Magnoliids
- Order: Laurales
- Family: Lauraceae
- Genus: Actinodaphne
- Species: A. molochina

Binomial name
- Actinodaphne molochina Nees

Synonyms
- Iozoste molochina (Nees) Kuntze

Species of flowering plant

Actinodaphne molochina is a species of flowering plant in the family Lauraceae. It is a tree endemic to Sri Lanka.
