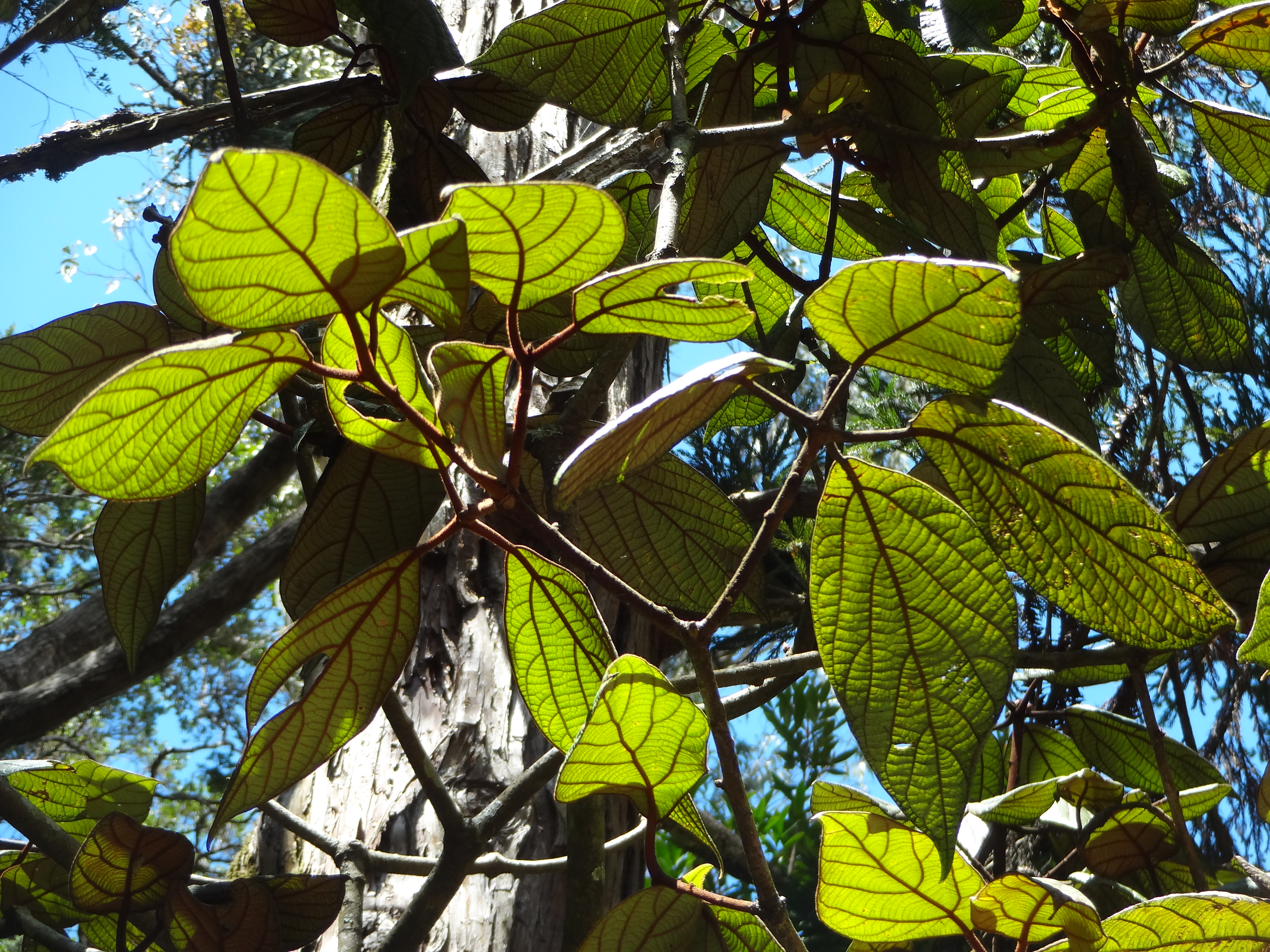
- Actinodaphne speciosa in Hakgale Botanical Garden

Conservation status
- Vulnerable (IUCN 3.1)

Scientific classification
- Kingdom: Plantae
- Clade: Tracheophytes
- Clade: Angiosperms
- Clade: Magnoliids
- Order: Laurales
- Family: Lauraceae
- Genus: Actinodaphne
- Species: A. speciosa

Binomial name
- Actinodaphne speciosa Nees

Synonyms
- Iozoste speciosa (Nees) Kuntze

= Actinodaphne speciosa =

Species of flowering plant

Actinodaphne speciosa, known as elephant ears, is a species of flowering plant in the family Lauraceae. It is a tree endemic to Sri Lanka.
