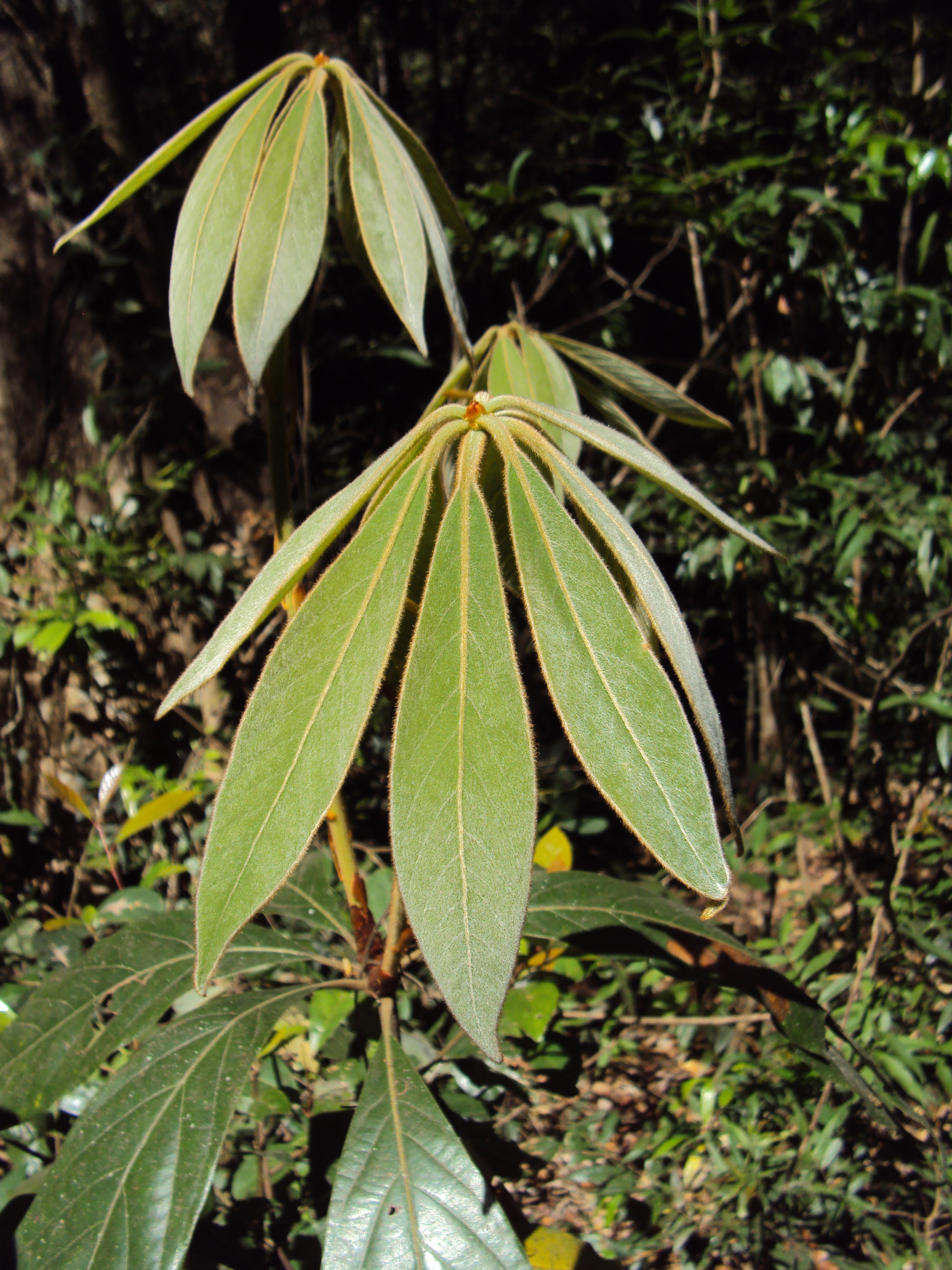

Conservation status
- Near Threatened (IUCN 3.1)

Scientific classification
- Kingdom: Plantae
- Clade: Tracheophytes
- Clade: Angiosperms
- Clade: Magnoliids
- Order: Laurales
- Family: Lauraceae
- Genus: Actinodaphne
- Species: A. bourdillonii

Binomial name
- Actinodaphne bourdillonii Gamble

= Actinodaphne bourdillonii =

Species of flowering plant

Actinodaphne bourdillonii is a species of the genus Actinodaphne of the flowering plant family Lauraceae, commonly called the malavirinji, eeyoli, and Pisa. It is endemic to the Southern Western Ghats (South Sahyadri and Palakkad Hills). Its general habitat is shola and montane evergreen forests from 600 to 2,000 metres elevation.

== Description ==
Actinodaphne bourdillonii is a tree up to 10 m tall. Branches and young branchlets are terete, fulvous tomentose. Leaves are simple, alternate, spiral, and subverticilate. Fruits are a black berry; containing a single seed inside the fruit. The flowering and fruiting season is from April to March.

Seed contains 48.4% fat. 96% of this fat is trilaurin. It also contains louric acid.

== Gallery ==
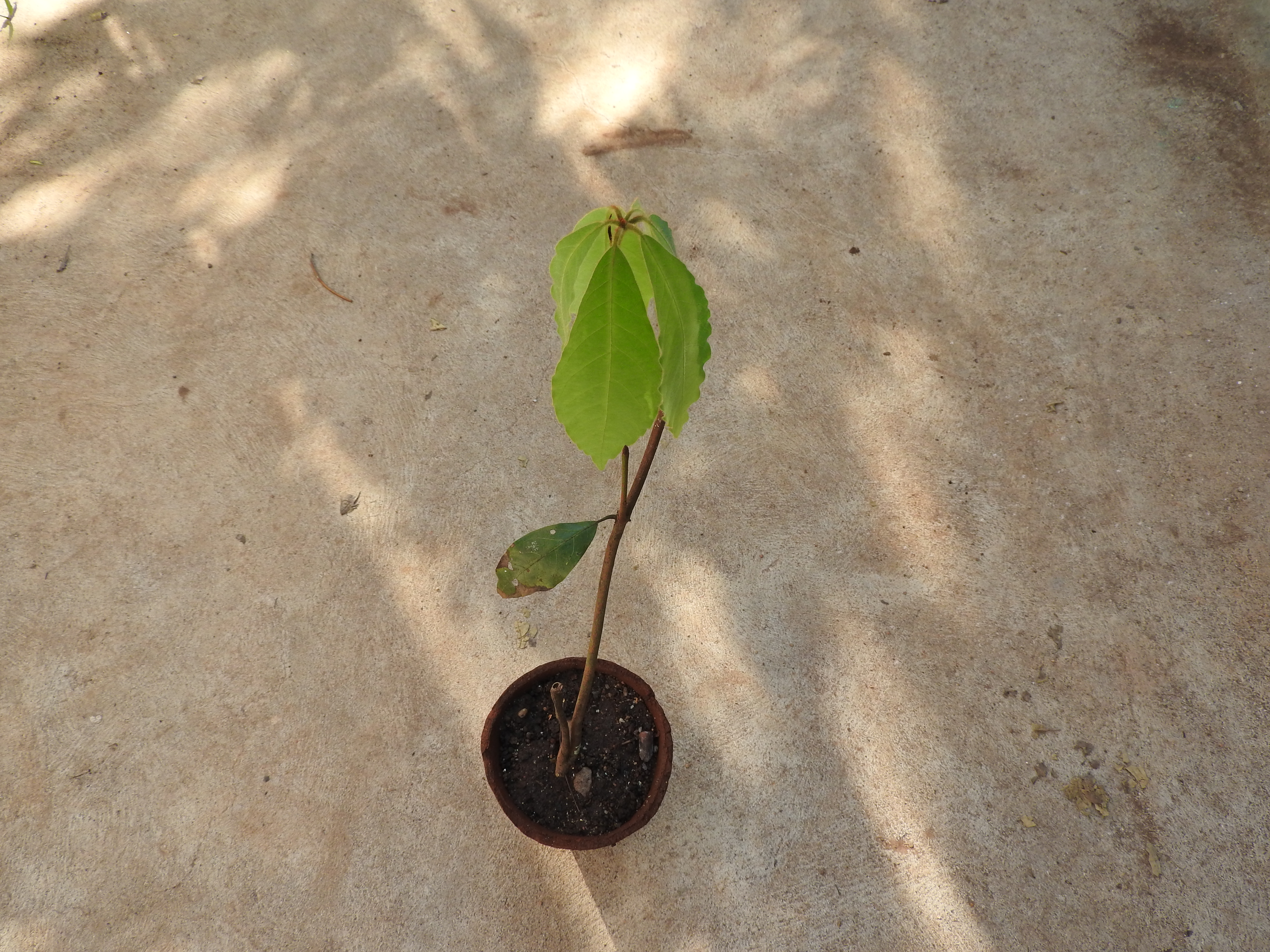

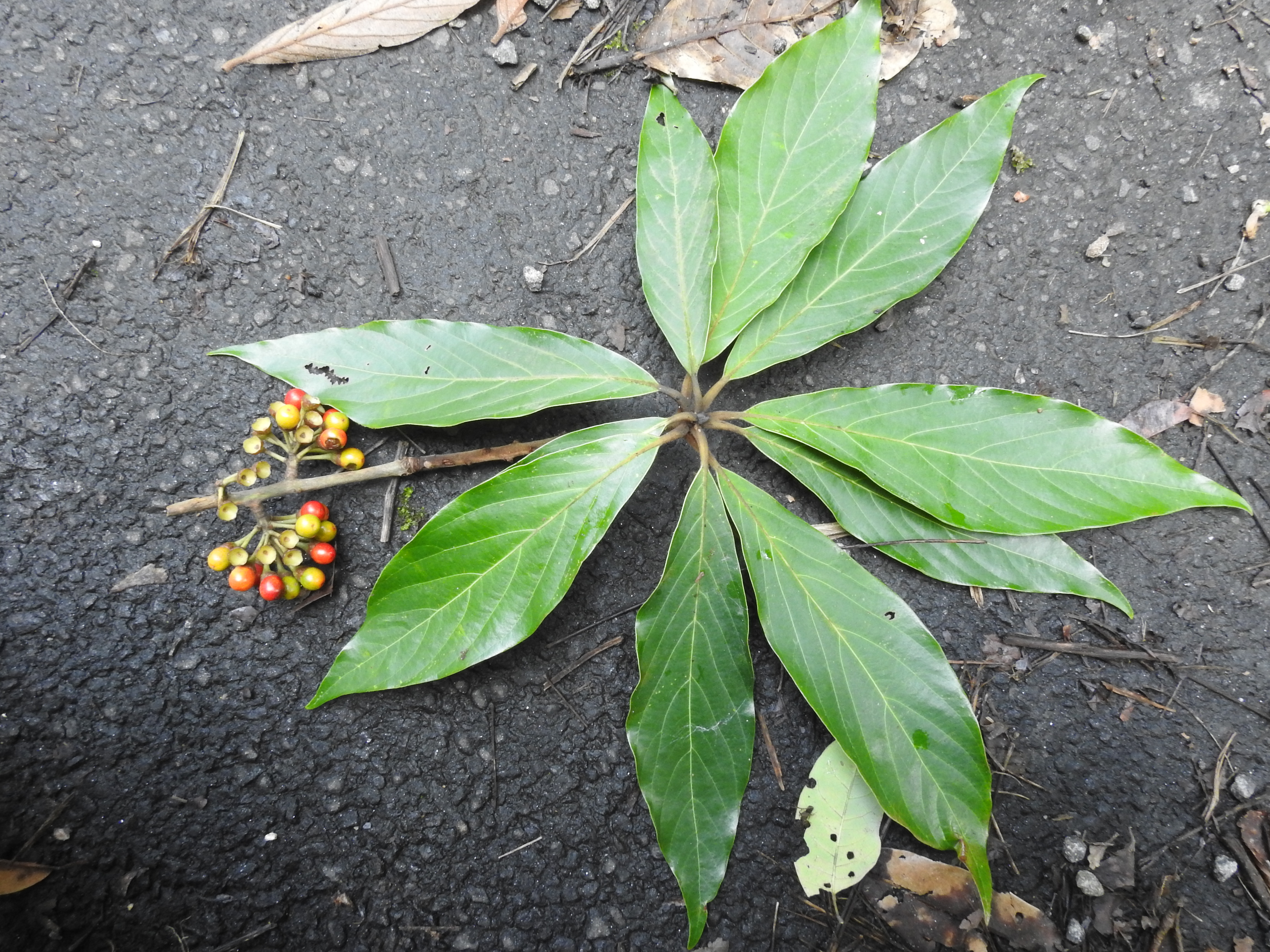

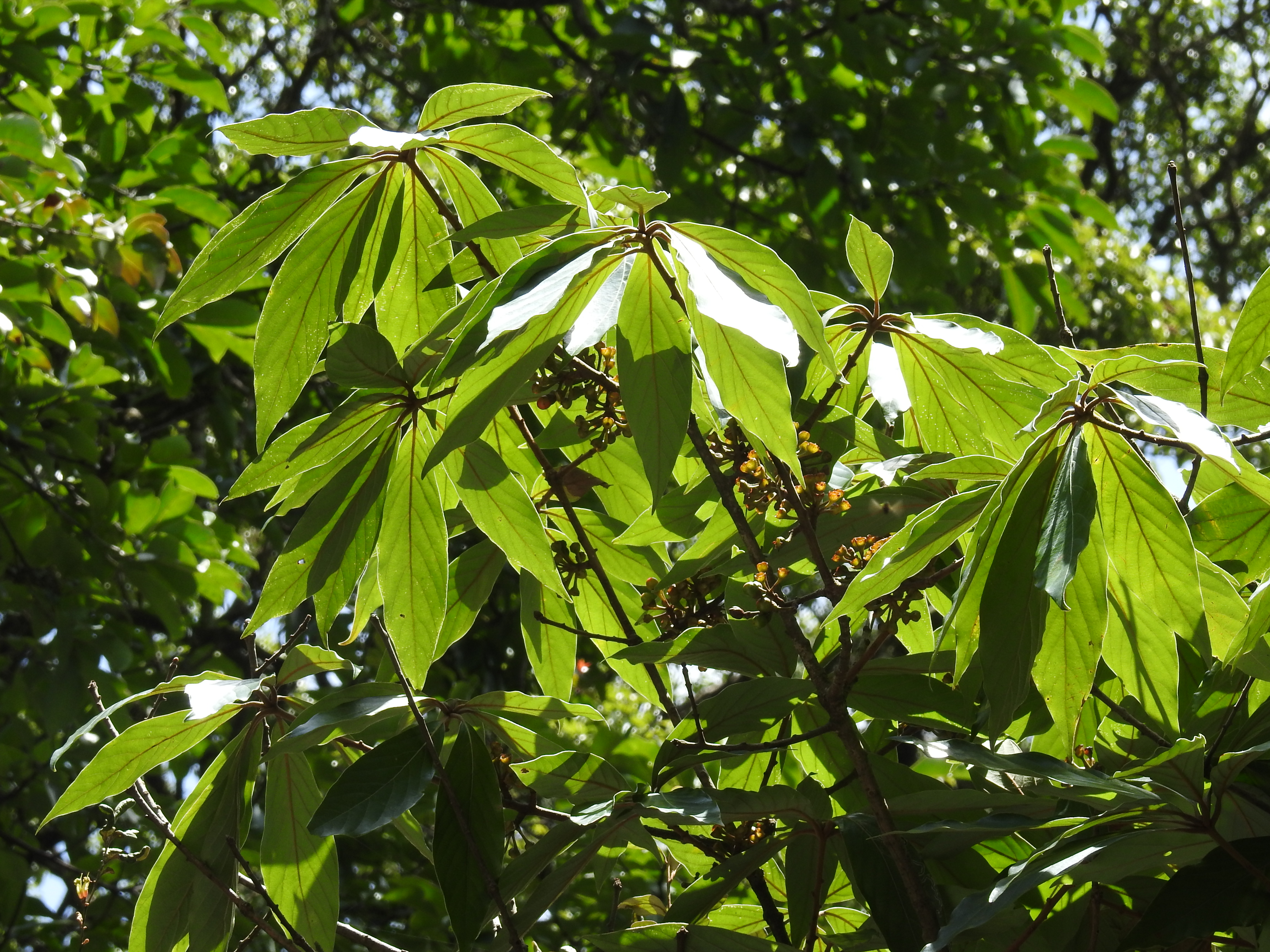

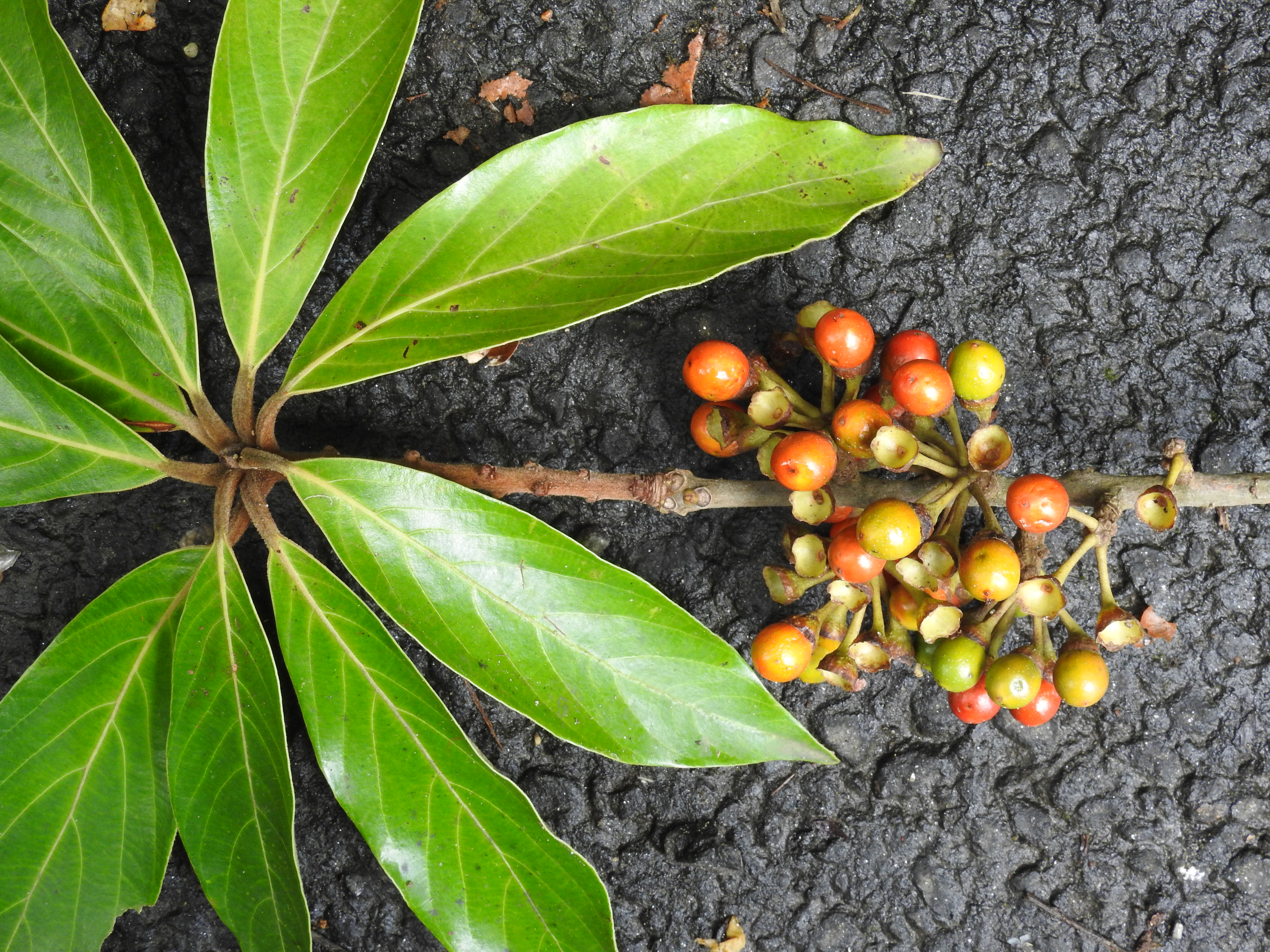

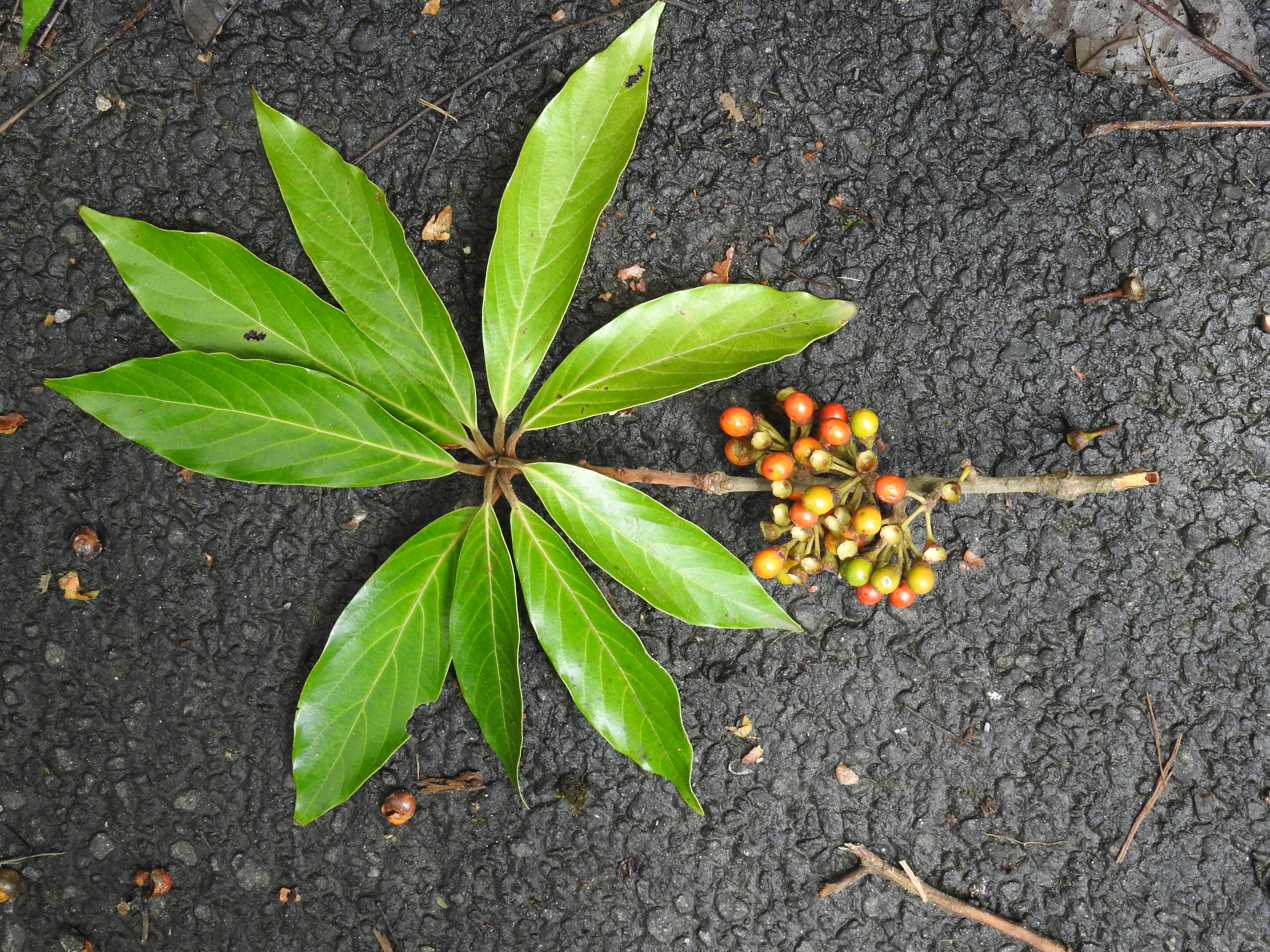

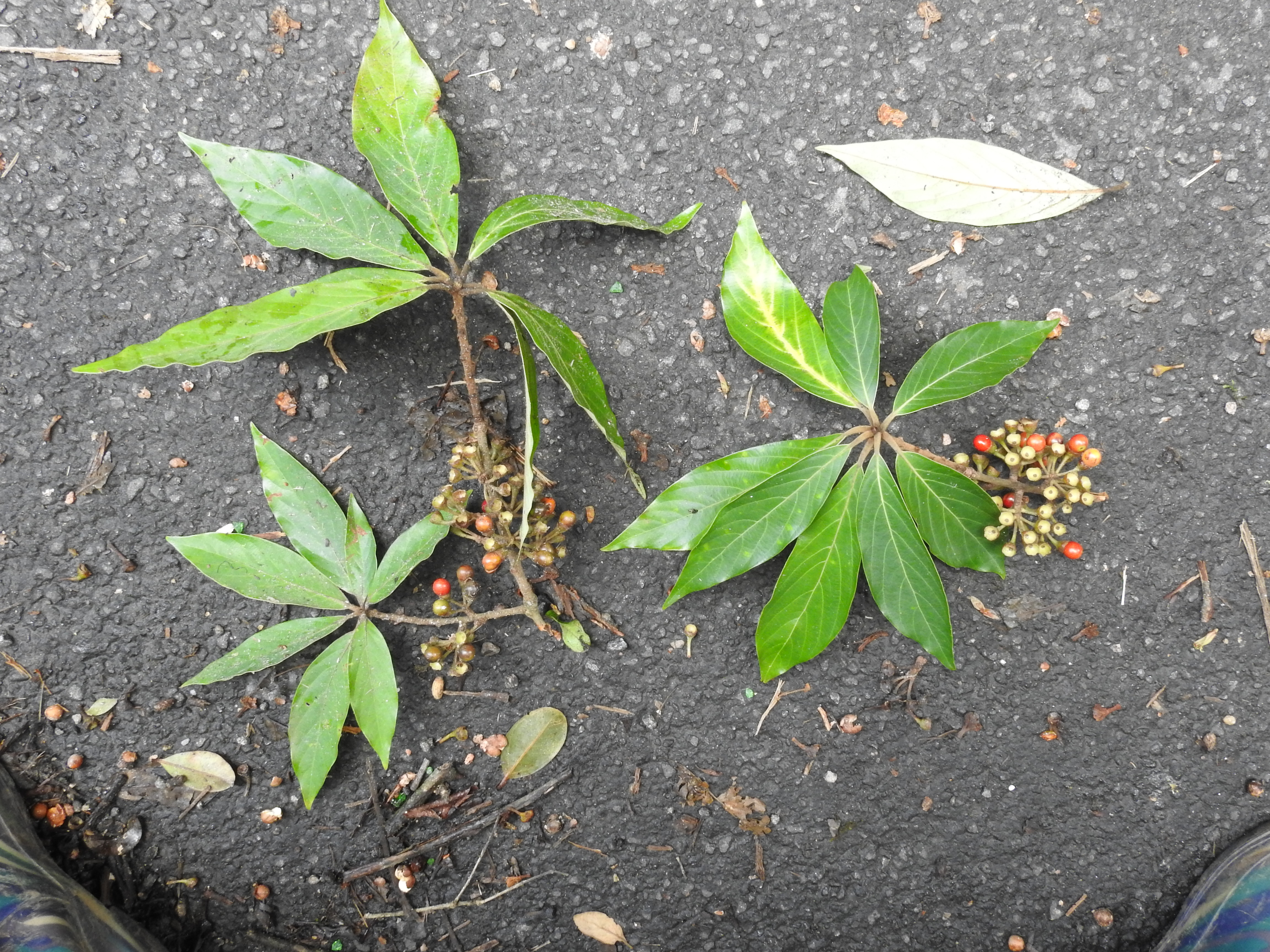

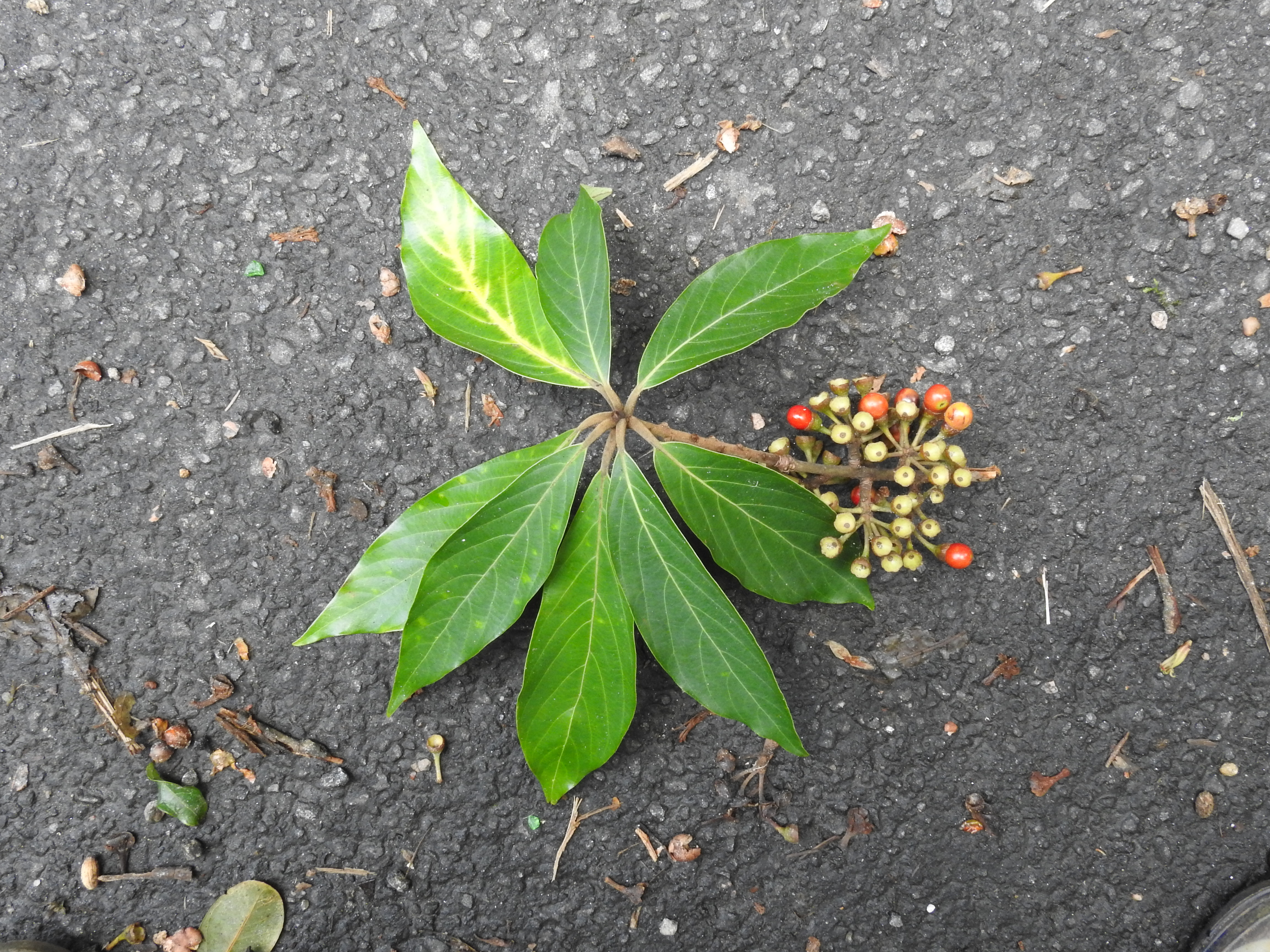

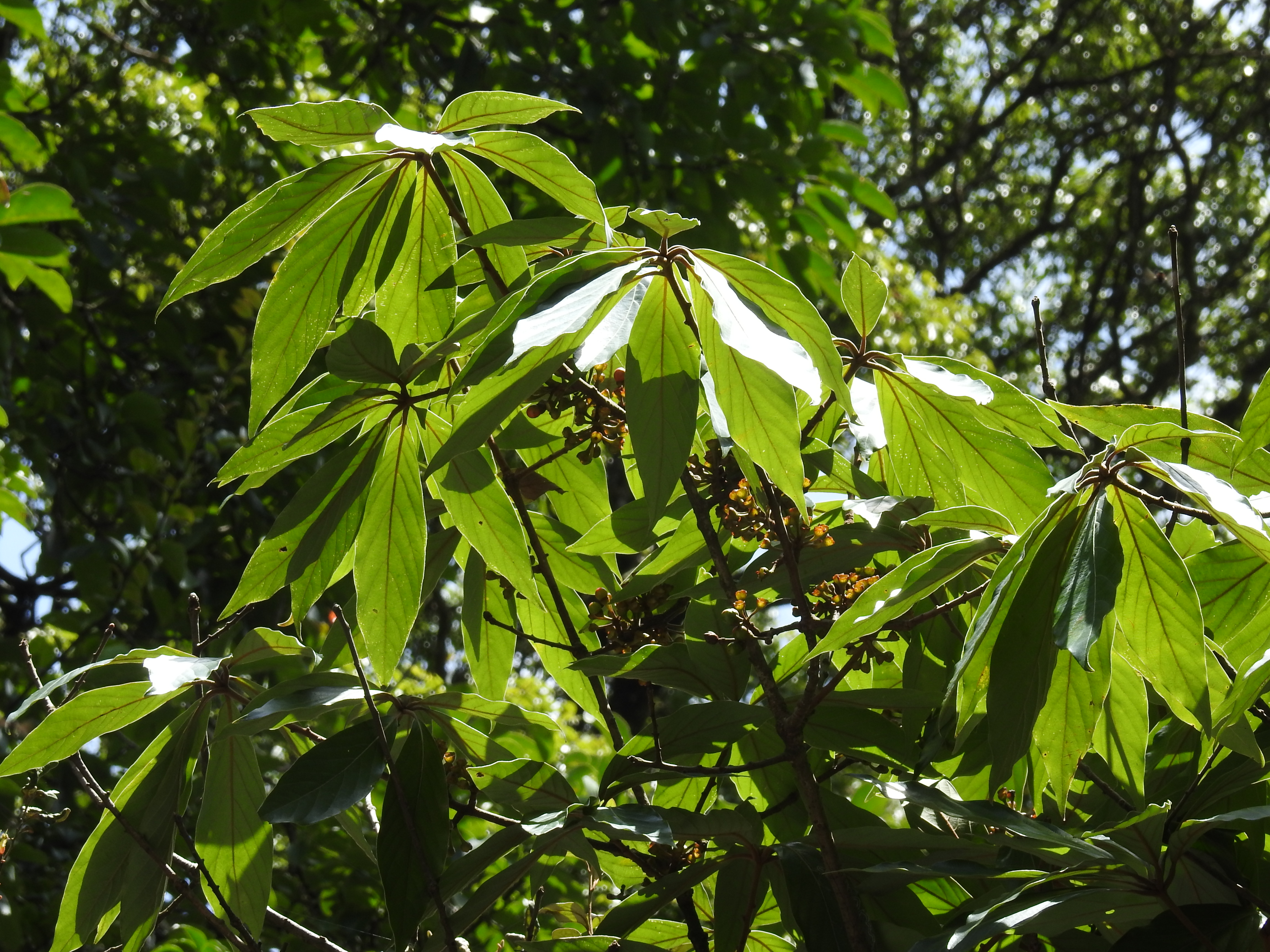
