= Actinodaphne pruinosa =

Conservation status
- Least Concern (IUCN 3.1)

Scientific classification
- Kingdom: Plantae
- Clade: Tracheophytes
- Clade: Angiosperms
- Clade: Magnoliids
- Order: Laurales
- Family: Lauraceae
- Genus: Actinodaphne
- Species: A. pruinosa

Binomial name
- Actinodaphne pruinosa Nees

Synonyms
- Actinodaphne foxworthyana Gibbs; Actinodaphne pruinosa var. kunstleri Gamble; Iozoste pruinosa Kuntze; Laurus pruinosa Wall

Species of tree

Actinodaphne pruinosa is a species of plant in the family Lauraceae. It is a tree which grows 18 to 20 metres tall. It is native to Peninsular Malaysia, Singapore, and Borneo.

It grows in primary and secondary lowland and montane rain forests, and in peat swamp and kerangas forests, from 90 to 4,000 metres elevation.
