= Actinodaphne ellipticibacca =

Conservation status
- Critically Endangered (IUCN 3.1)

Scientific classification
- Kingdom: Plantae
- Clade: Tracheophytes
- Clade: Angiosperms
- Clade: Magnoliids
- Order: Laurales
- Family: Lauraceae
- Genus: Actinodaphne
- Species: A. ellipticibacca

Binomial name
- Actinodaphne ellipticibacca Kosterm.

Species of tree

Actinodaphne ellipticibacca is a species of flowering plant in the family Lauraceae. It is a tree endemic to northern Vietnam.
