= Actinodaphne montana =

Conservation status
- Least Concern (IUCN 3.1)

Scientific classification
- Kingdom: Plantae
- Clade: Tracheophytes
- Clade: Angiosperms
- Clade: Magnoliids
- Order: Laurales
- Family: Lauraceae
- Genus: Actinodaphne
- Species: A. montana

Binomial name
- Actinodaphne montana Gamble

Species of tree

Actinodaphne montana is a species of plant in the family Lauraceae. It is a tree endemic to Peninsular Malaysia. The Latin specific epithet montana refers to mountains or coming from mountains.
