= Actinodaphne multiflora =

Conservation status
- Least Concern (IUCN 3.1)

Scientific classification
- Kingdom: Plantae
- Clade: Embryophytes
- Clade: Tracheophytes
- Clade: Angiosperms
- Clade: Magnoliids
- Order: Laurales
- Family: Lauraceae
- Genus: Actinodaphne
- Species: A. multiflora

Binomial name
- Actinodaphne multiflora Benth.

Synonyms
- Iozoste multiflora (Benth.) Kuntze; Neolitsea vidalii Merr.

Species of tree

Actinodaphne multiflora is a species of flowering plant in the family Lauraceae. It is a tree native to the Fiji and the Solomon Islands. It grows in lowland tropical moist forest.
