= Shola =

Patch of stunted tropical montane forest in South India

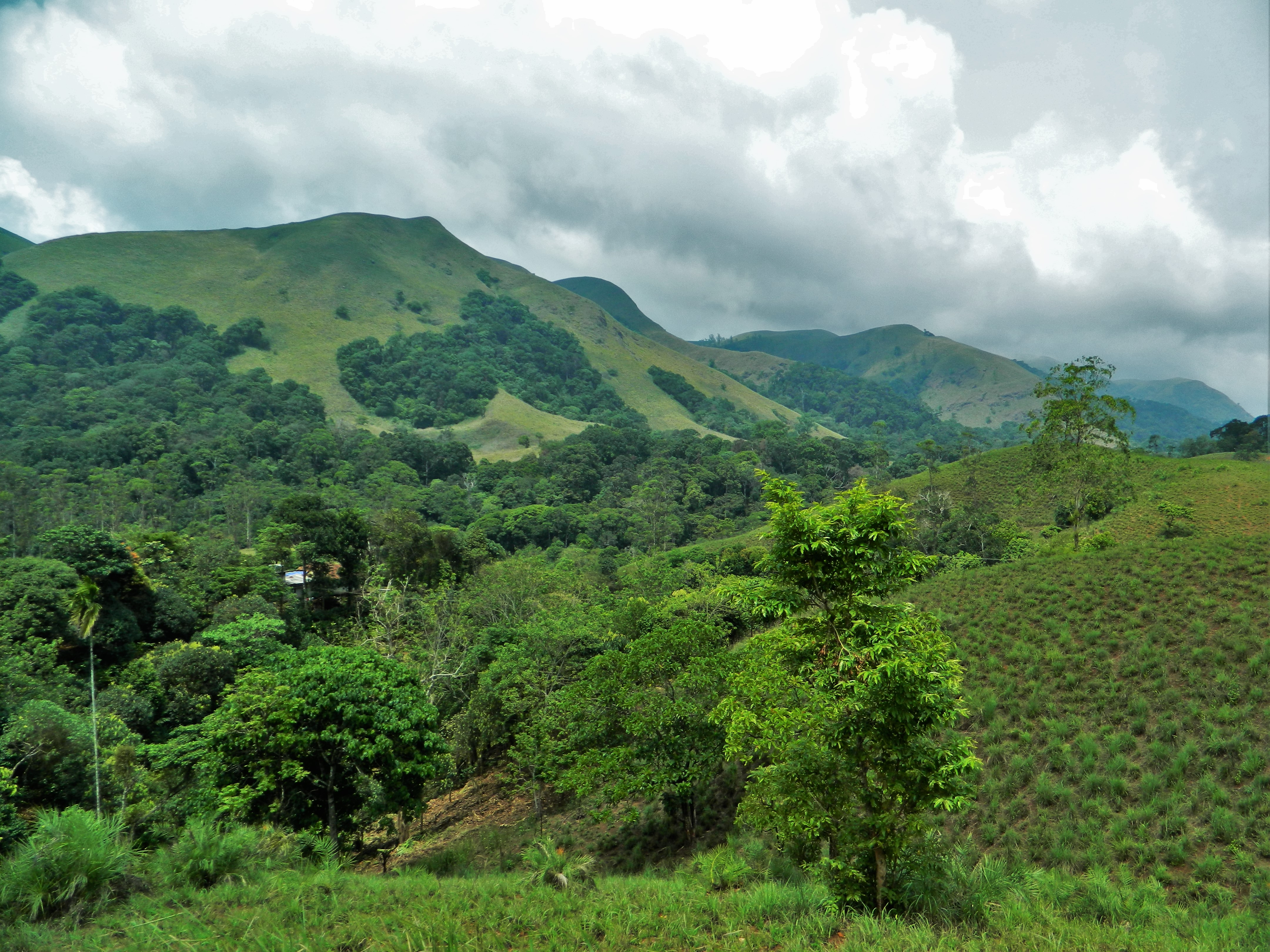
Sholas in southern Western Ghats.

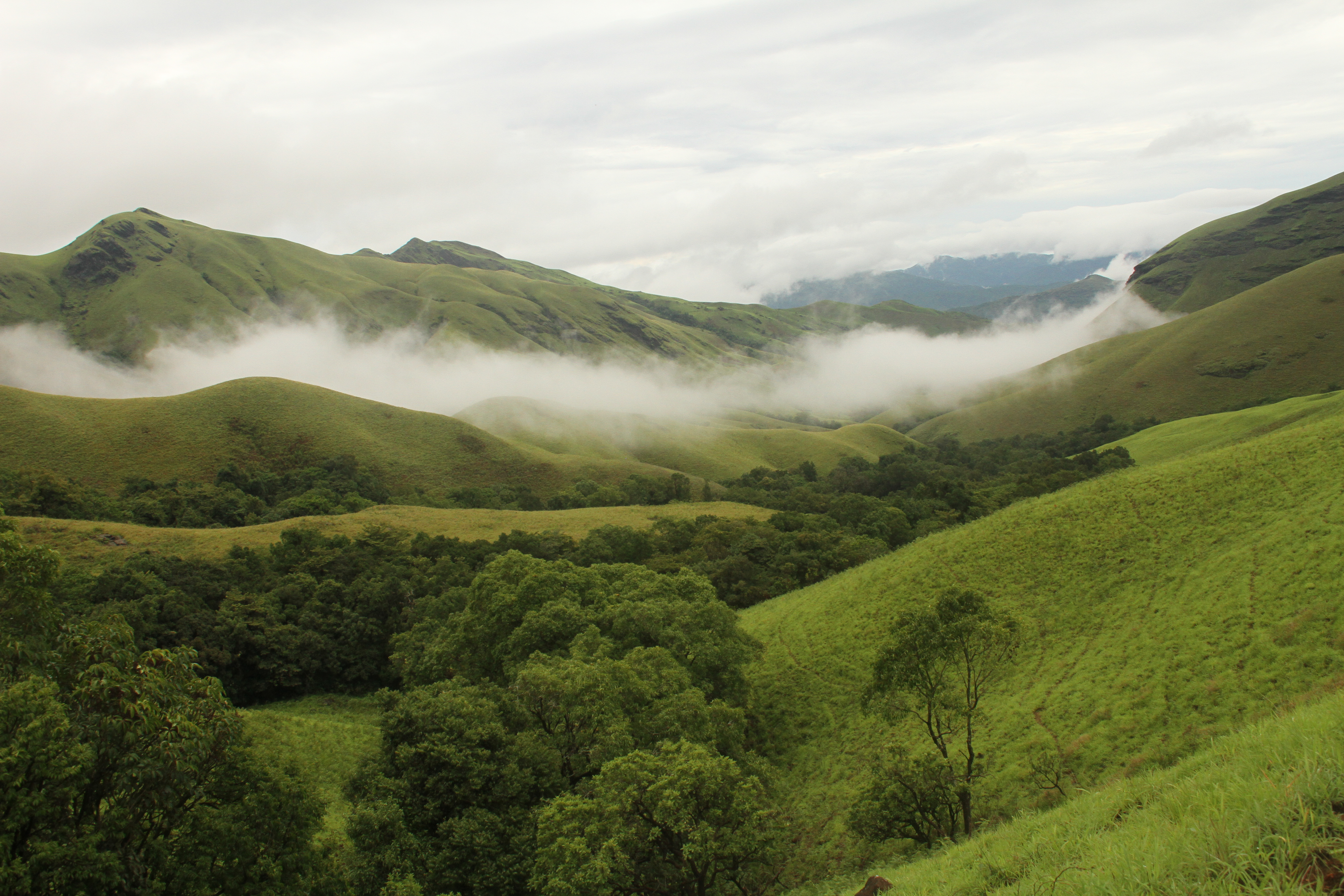
Shola forest and grassland

A shola is the local name for a patch of stunted tropical montane forest found in valleys amid rolling grassland in the higher montane regions of South India, largely in Kerala, Karnataka and Tamilnadu. These patches of shola forest are found mainly in the valleys and are usually separated from one another by undulating montane grassland. The shola and grassland together form the shola-grassland complex or mosaic. Not all such high-elevation grasslands have sholas in their valleys, especially if they are isolated from other such meadows, such as the meadows found in the Idamalayar Reserve Forest in Ernakulam district of Kerala. The word 'Shola' is probably derived from the Tamil language word cōlai (சோலை) meaning grove.

The shola-forest and grassland complex has been described as a climatic climax vegetation with forest regeneration and expansion restricted by climatic conditions such as frost or soil characteristics while others have suggested that it may have anthropogenic origins in the burning and removal of forests by early herders and shifting agriculturists.

== Distribution and origin ==
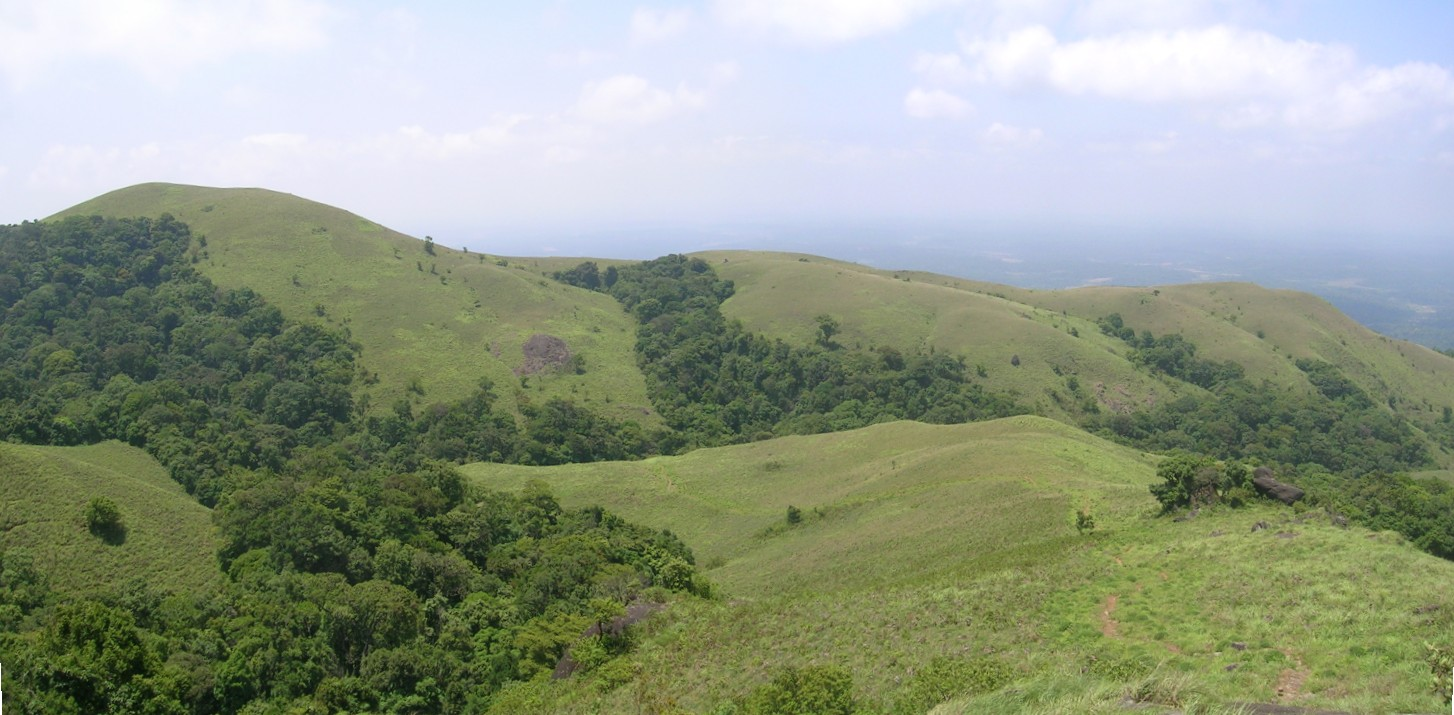
Shola forest interspersed in valleys among high elevation grasslands on the Brahmagiri Hills

Shola forests are found in the higher elevation hill regions of the Nilgiris, Anaimalai, around Anamudi, Palni hills, Meghamalai, Agasthyamalai to the south and the Malnad and associated ranges in parts of Wayanad, Coorg, Baba Budangiri, Kudremukh up the north, to Goa, Satara district and Sindhudurg district in the states of Karnataka, Kerala, Goa, Maharashtra and Tamil Nadu. Although generally said to occur above 2000 meters above sea level, shola forests can be found at 1600 meters elevation in many hill ranges (e.g. Biligiriranga Hills).

The origin of the shola forest and grassland complex has been the subject of scientific debate. Some early researchers suggested that the floristic composition represents a stable final state or climax vegetation. This stability is maintained by climatic conditions such as frost which allow the grass to grow but kill off any forest seedlings. Others have suggested that the grassland may have been created and maintained by early pastoralists and point out that fire has a major role in the maintenance of the grassland. There is evidence for both and several features of the forest trees and the grasslands that have been considered and debated. Pollen analysis from bogs in the Nilgiris suggest that the complex of grassland and forest existed 35,000 years ago, long before human impact began. Long-term studies on the dynamic processes of vegetation change continue.

== Fauna ==
Due to their isolation, elevation, and evergreen character, shola forests are home to many threatened and endemic species. Some of the species found here have close relatives only in the distant evergreen forests of Northeast India, the Himalayas and Southeast Asia. Some others are found nowhere else in the world.

The Western Ghats are one of the globally recognized biodiversity hotspots. Colias nilagiriensis is a species of butterfly endemic to shola grasslands above 2000m, sometimes being considered a subspecies of Colias erate. Like most other species in the genus Colias, it is found at high elevations and subtropical climate. However, this is the only one found in South India. Among the many larger animals inhabiting a shola-grassland mosaic are tigers, leopards, elephants and gaur. The endangered Nilgiri tahr (of the family Bovidae, which includes gazelles, antelopes, and wild buffaloes) is endemic to the shola-grassland, and its range is now restricted to a 400-km stretch of shola-grassland mosaic, from the Nilgiri Hills to the Agasthyamalai Hills. Laughingthrushes, Nilgiri woodpigeons, shortwings, and some of the endemic flycatchers (black-and-orange flycatcher and Nilgiri flycatcher) are some of the 300+ species of birds that inhabit this area. The area shows high endemicity and is rivaled only by the forests in northeast India; 35 percent of the plants, 42 percent of the fish, 48 percent of the reptiles, and 75 percent of the amphibians, and about 13 percent of the insects, about 25 percent not being found east of Bangalore, that live in these forests are endemic species.

== Flora ==
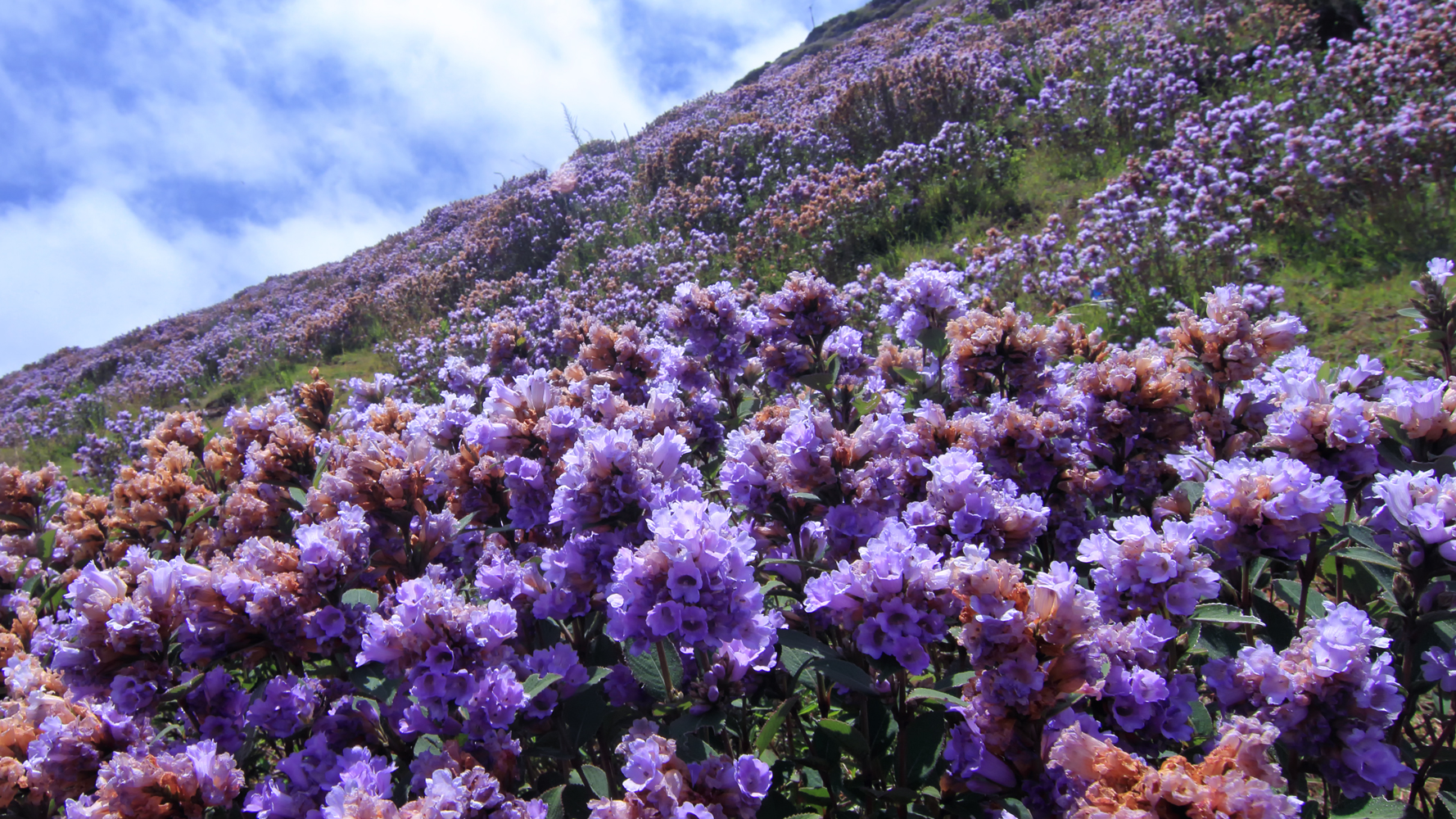
A hillside with mass Kurinji flowering in 2018

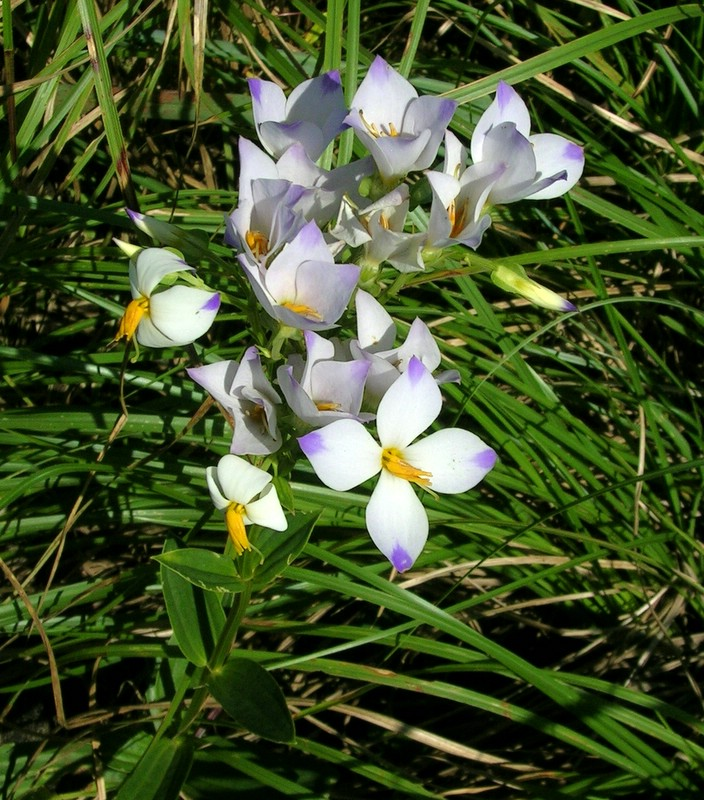
Exacum tetragonum, a shola grassland plant

At least 25 types of trees are present in the major sholas of the Nilgiri Hills. The dominant trees in this type of forest are Magnolia nilagirica, Bischofia javanica (bishop wood), Calophyllum tomentosum, Toona ciliata (Indian mahogany), Eugenia (myrtle) spp., Ficus glomerata (atti or cluster fig tree or gular fig tree) and Mallotus spp. Shola forests have an upper storey of small trees, generally Prunus ceylanica, Heptapleurum racemosum, Chionanthus ramiflorus, Syzygium spp., Rhododendron arboreum subsp. nilagiricum, Elaeocarpus recurvatus, Ilex denticulata, Magnolia nilagirica, Actinodaphne bourdillonii, and Litsea wightiana. Below the upper story is a low under story and a dense shrub layer. Strobilanthes kunthiana, known as Kurinji or Neelakurinji in Tamil, is a well known shrub endemic to Western Ghats that blossoms only once in 12 years. There is a thick concentration of mosses growing on the under story and many ferns in the sunlit narrow transition to grassland. Shola forests are interspersed with montane grasslands, characterized by frost- and fire-resistant grass species like Chrysopogon nodulibarbis, Cymbopogon flexuosus, Arundinella ciliata, Arundinella mesophylla, Arundinella tuberculata, Themeda tremula, and Sehima nervosa.

== Threats ==
Invasive introduced species are a serious threat to this high elevation ecosystem. Some, like Acacia mearnsii and Eucalyptus globulus are the consequence of commercial plantation and afforestation drives, especially in the Nilgiri Mountains. Other threatening invasive species include Lantana camara and Ageratina adenophora.

== Conservation ==
Periodic fires have been considered to help maintain the grassland, however, excessive burning has led to a shrinkage of forest patches and the growth of invasive species.

The shola biome has a high water retention capacity and exists as the primary source of the water for the high elevation organisms is the origin of many streams and rivers in the Western Ghats.

== Gallery ==
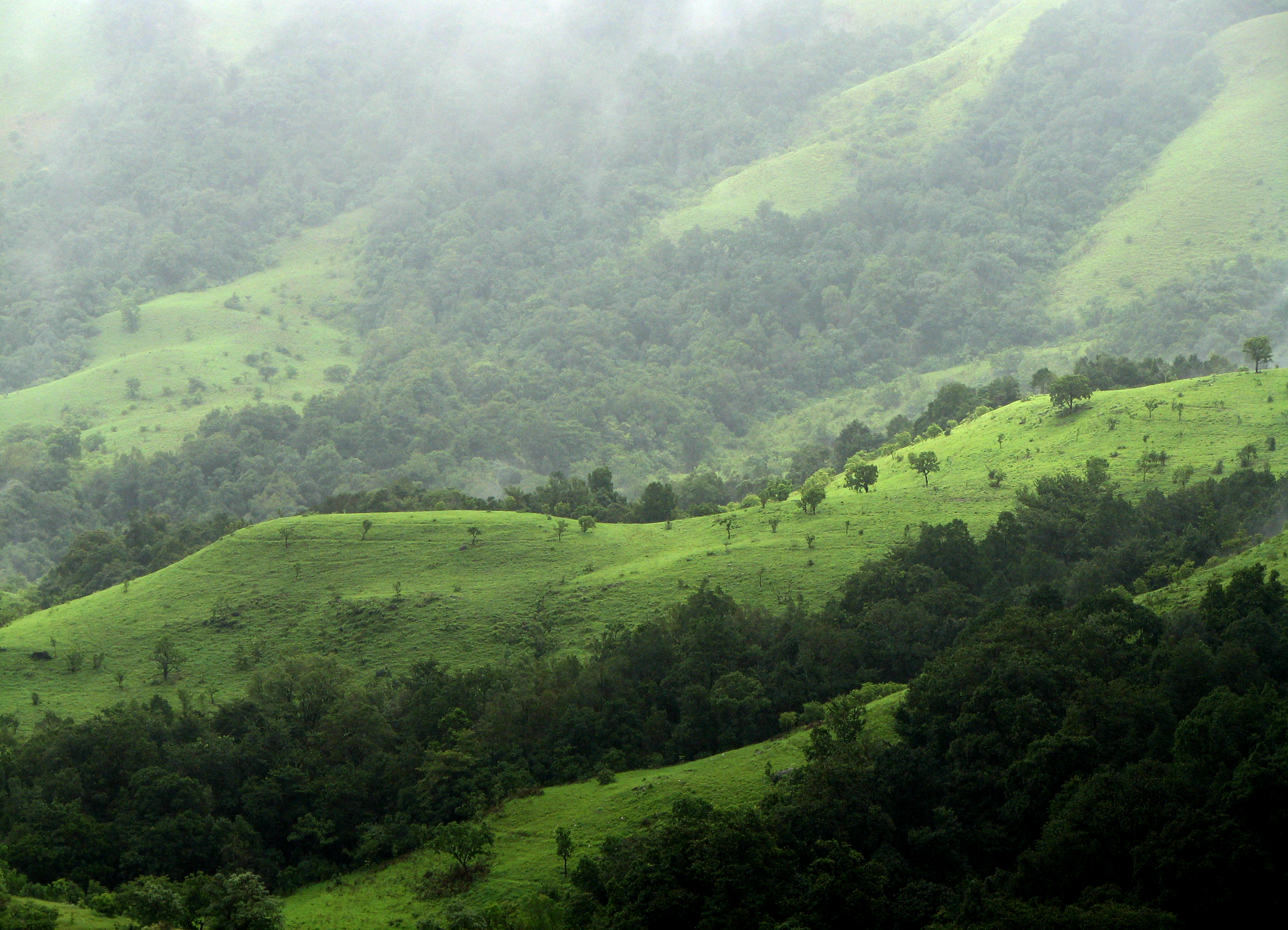
Shola-Grasslands complex in the Kudremukh National Park

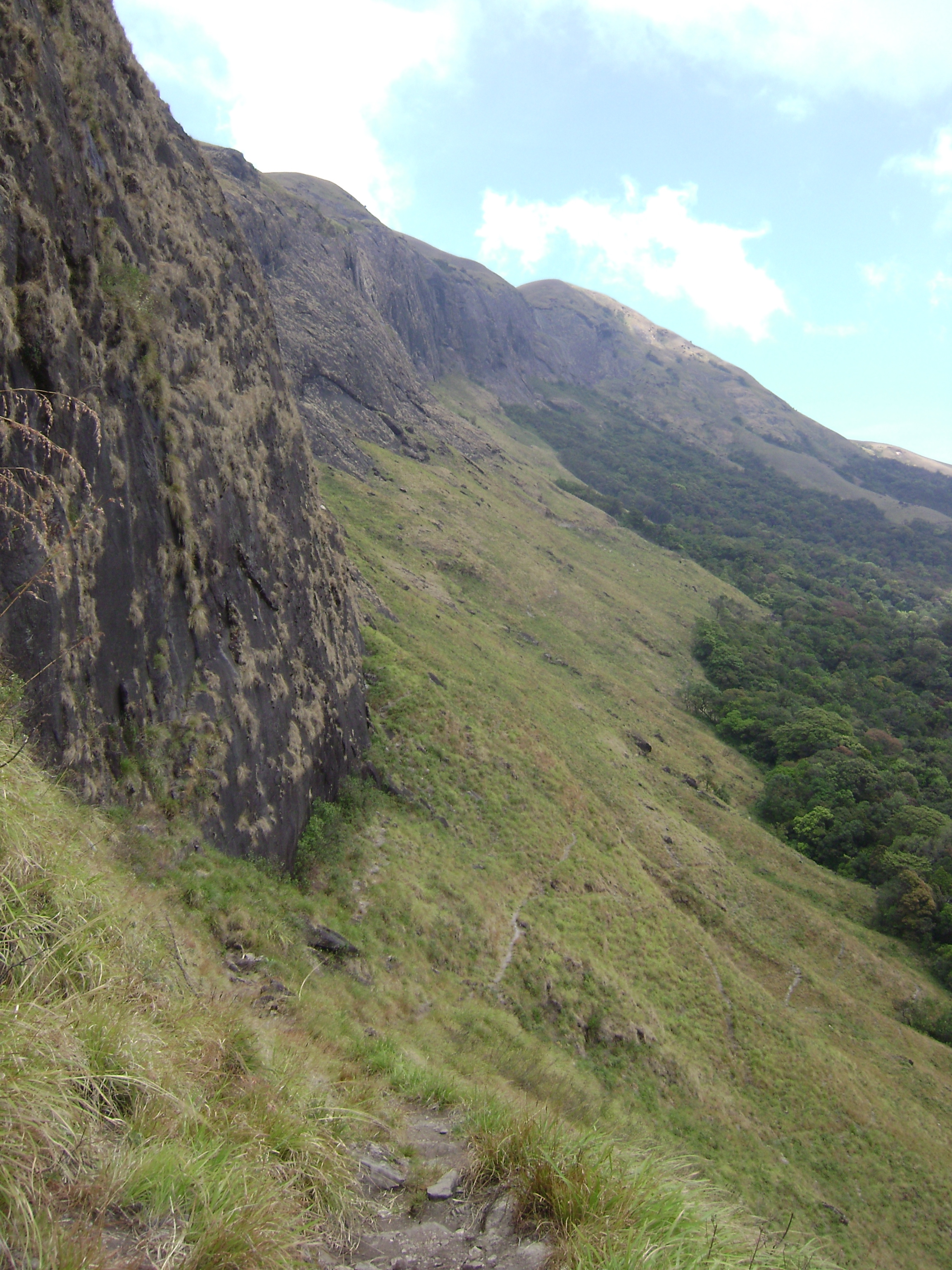
Shola, grass and mountain en route to Grass Hills,
Indira Gandhi National Park

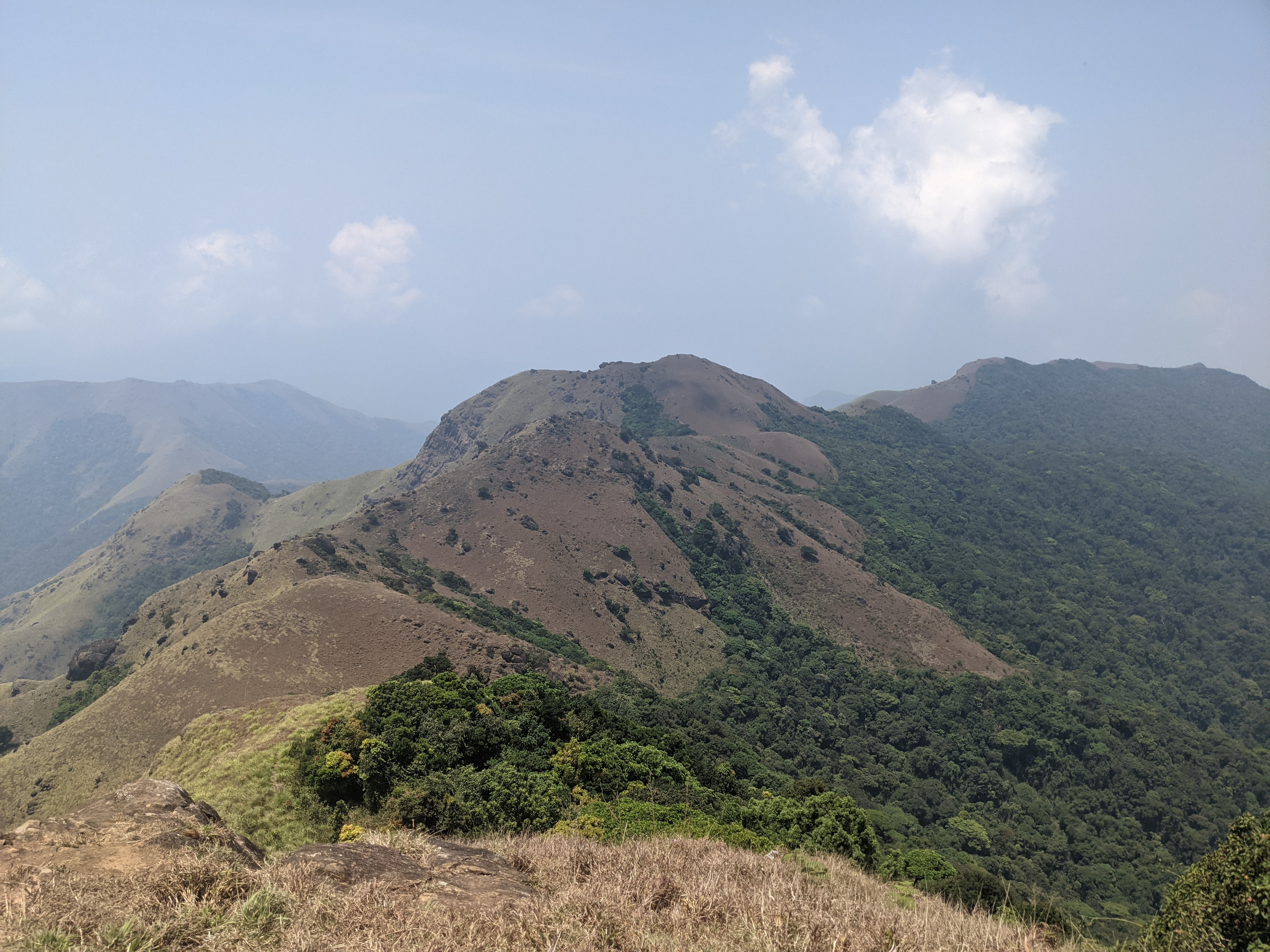
Shola forest & grasslands on way to the Tadiandamol peak

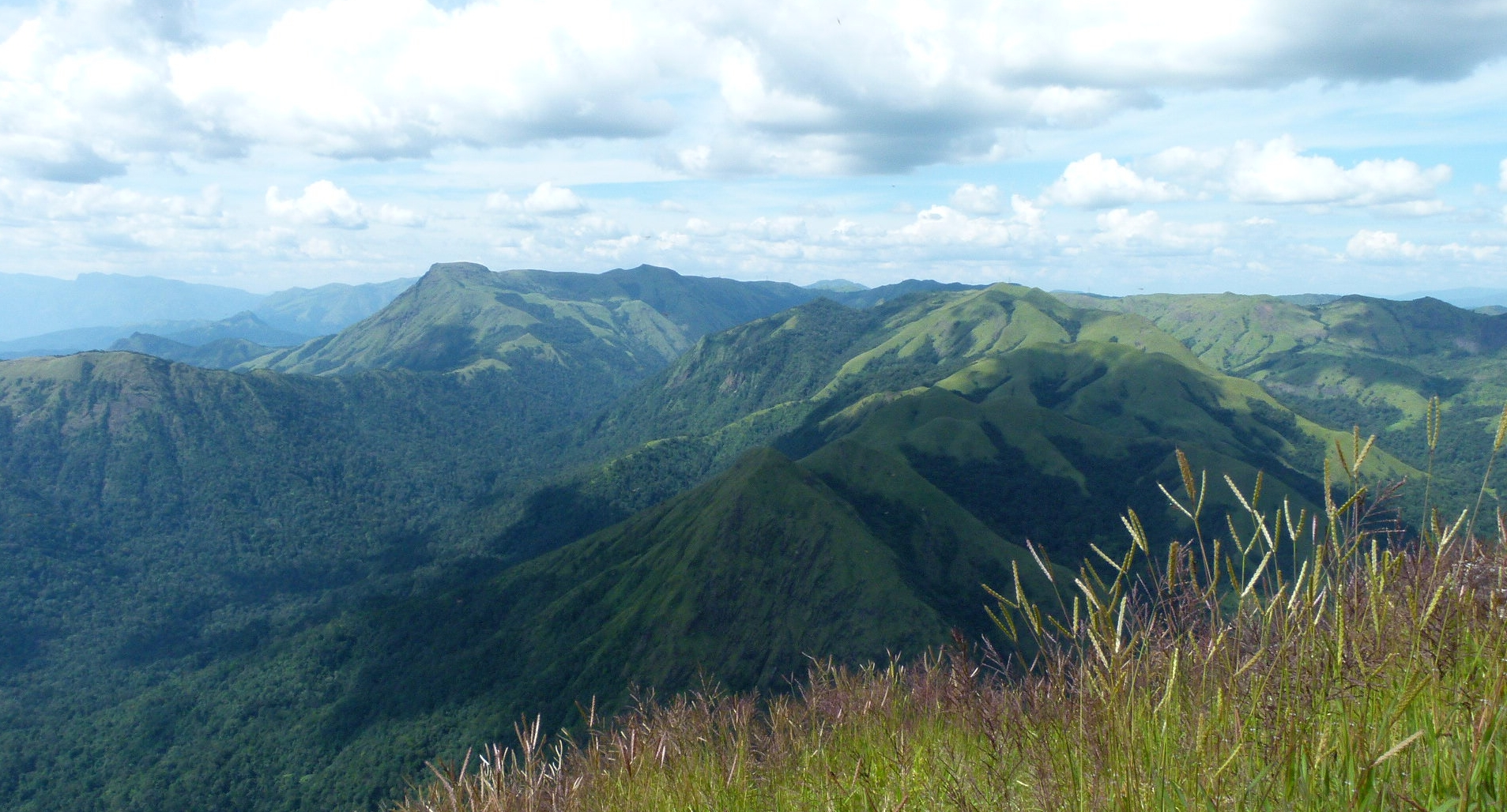

== See also ==
- Meadow
- Grassland
- Bugyals
