= Actinodaphne notabilis =

Conservation status
- Least Concern (IUCN 3.1)

Scientific classification
- Kingdom: Plantae
- Clade: Tracheophytes
- Clade: Angiosperms
- Clade: Magnoliids
- Order: Laurales
- Family: Lauraceae
- Genus: Actinodaphne
- Species: A. notabilis

Binomial name
- Actinodaphne notabilis Doweld

Synonyms
- Actinodaphne cuspidata Gamble; Actinodaphne perakensis Govaerts

Species of tree

Actinodaphne notabilis (synonym Actinodaphne cuspidata) is a species of plant in the family Lauraceae. It is a tree endemic to Peninsular Malaysia. It is threatened by habitat loss.
