= Actinodaphne johorensis =

Conservation status
- Vulnerable (IUCN 2.3)

Scientific classification
- Kingdom: Plantae
- Clade: Tracheophytes
- Clade: Angiosperms
- Clade: Magnoliids
- Order: Laurales
- Family: Lauraceae
- Genus: Actinodaphne
- Species: A. johorensis

Binomial name
- Actinodaphne johorensis Gamble

Species of flowering plant

Actinodaphne johorensis is a species of plant in the family Lauraceae. It is endemic to Peninsular Malaysia. It is threatened by habitat loss.
