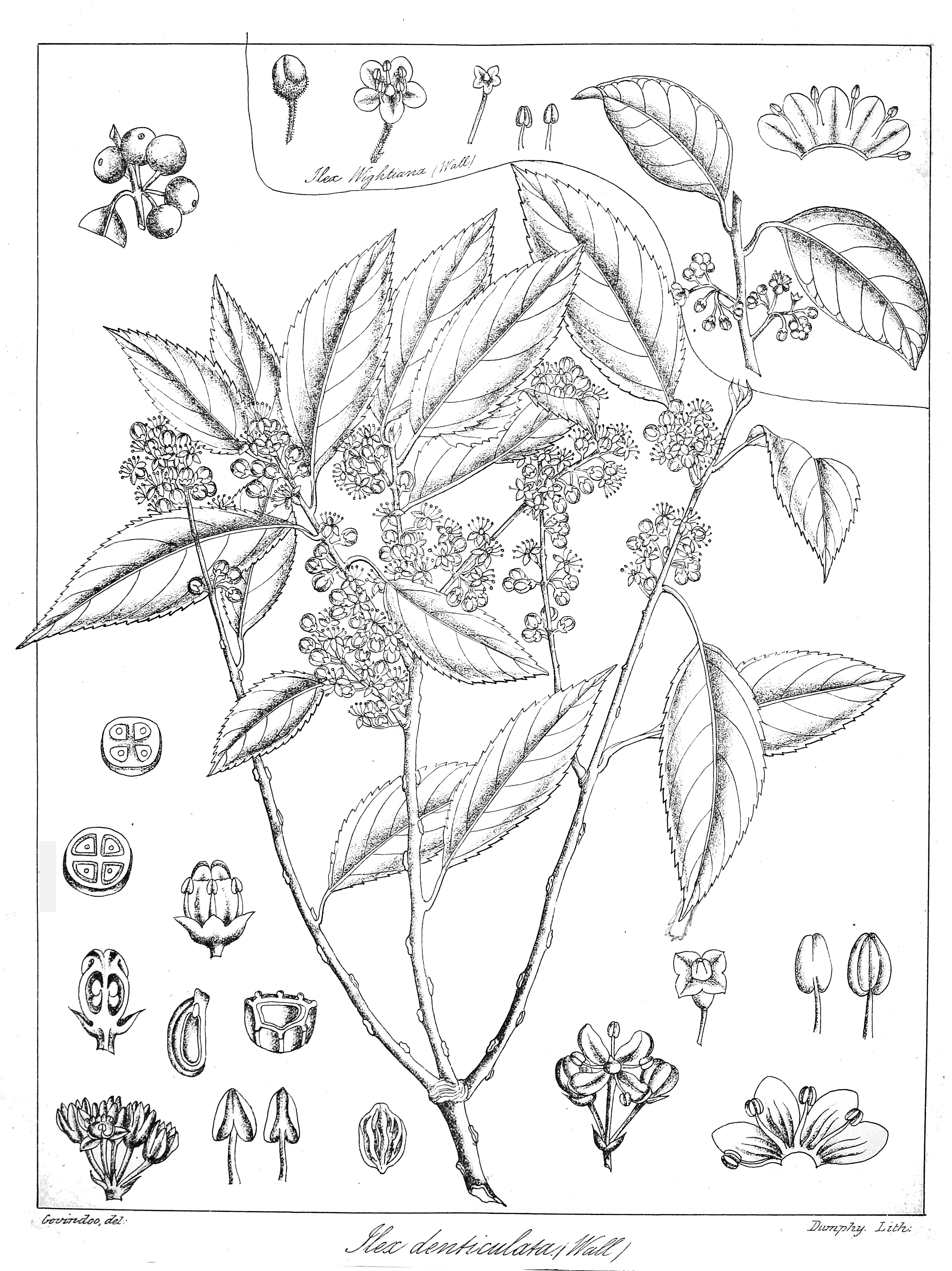
- Illustration of Ilex denticulata.

Scientific classification
- Kingdom: Plantae
- Clade: Tracheophytes
- Clade: Angiosperms
- Clade: Eudicots
- Clade: Asterids
- Order: Aquifoliales
- Family: Aquifoliaceae
- Genus: Ilex
- Species: I. denticulata

Binomial name
- Ilex denticulata Wall. ex Wight

= Ilex denticulata =

Species of holly

Ilex denticulata is a species of plant in the family Aquifoliaceae. It is native to China South-Central, India and Sri Lanka.

== Description ==
It is a small tree or large shrub.

== Phenology ==
The plant flowers and fruits from January to February.
