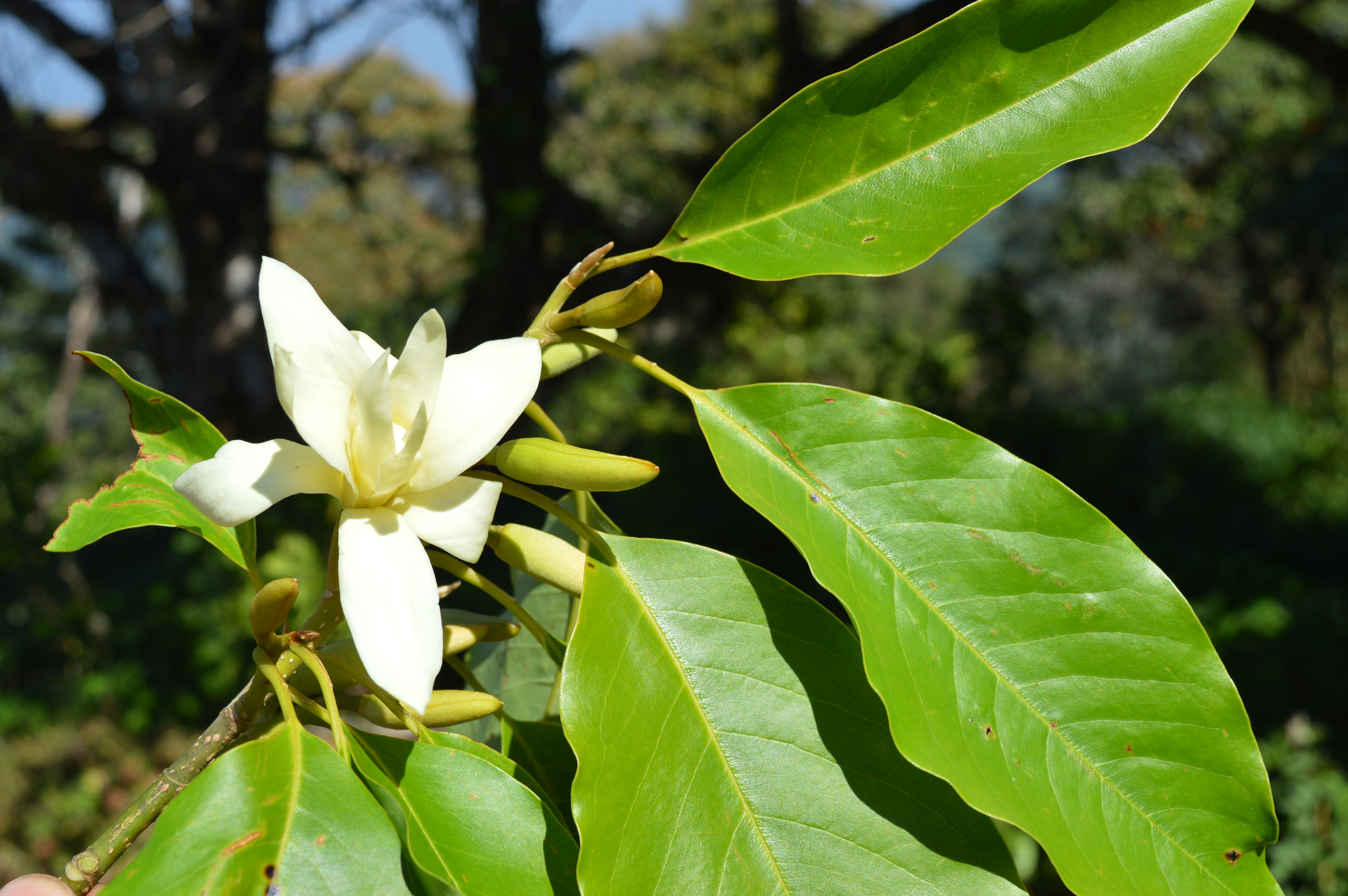
- Inflorescence and leaves of Magnolia nilagirica

Conservation status
- Vulnerable (IUCN 3.1)

Scientific classification
- Kingdom: Plantae
- Clade: Embryophytes
- Clade: Tracheophytes
- Clade: Spermatophytes
- Clade: Angiosperms
- Clade: Magnoliids
- Order: Magnoliales
- Family: Magnoliaceae
- Genus: Magnolia
- Subgenus: Magnolia subg. Yulania
- Section: Magnolia sect. Michelia
- Subsection: Magnolia subsect. Michelia
- Species: M. nilagirica

Binomial name
- Magnolia nilagirica (Zenker) Figlar

Synonyms
- Michelia glauca Wight; M. nilagirica Zenker (basionym); M. n. var. walkeri (Wight) Hook.f. & Thomson; M. n. var. wightii Hook.f. & Thomson; M. ovalifolia Wight; M. pulneyensis Wight; M. walkeri Wight; Sampacca nilagirica (Zenker) Kuntze

= Magnolia nilagirica =

Species of tree

Magnolia nilagirica is a species of plant in the family Magnoliaceae. It is a tree that is threatened by habitat loss, endemic to the Western Ghats of India (including Agastya Mala, the Megamalai Wildlife Sanctuary, the Anaimalai and Palni Hills, the Nilgiri mountains, and Baba Budangiri), and also Sri Lanka.

== Description ==
A large tree; bark is brown with grey highlights and presents a cracked appearance. Leaves measure 5–10 cm (2.0–3.9 in) × 2–4 cm (0.79–1.57 in) and are elliptic with both ends tapering. Flower petals are white, measuring about 7.5–10 cm (3.0–3.9 in) across; sepals measure between 9–12 cm (3.5–4.7 in), narrow at their innermost, and ever broader as they approach the outermost perimeter; carpels are sessile. Fruits measure 5–8 cm (2.0–3.1 in) in length, with many warty yellow follicles each about 1.5 cm (0.59 in) long, containing 1 to 2 scarlet seeds.

== Botanical classification ==
Magnolia nilagirica was originally described and published under the name Michelia nilagirica (the basionym) by Jonathan Carl Zenker (1799–1837) in Plantae Indicae, quas in montibus … , 2: 21, t. 20. 1836. In 2000 it was reclassified under the genus Magnolia by Richard B. Figlar (In: Proceedings of the International Symposium on the Family Magnoliaceae, 23. 2000. Guangzhou, China).

== Ecological vulnerability ==
Due to this tree's excellent wood quality, it is under severe threat of being over-logged. In general, the forests in which it grows are rapidly being harvested, at a faster pace than is needed to allow the forests a chance to regrow; it is estimated that this species in particular has lost 40% of its wild growing population during a period of about 180 years. The IUCN (2015) has determined that no improvements have been implemented to halt this pace of deforestation, and therefore have assessed its status as "vulnerable". IUCN has not determined whether the stands of trees are becoming fragmented from within, or are more or less shrinking in area from the perimeter of their ranges.

== Vernacular names ==
This tree is known by different common names in various languages of India, as shown below:

- Hindi: pila champa
- Tamil: kattu shanbagam
- Kannada: bana sampige, bili sampige, bilisampage, dodda sampige
- Telugu: tella sampanga
- Sinhala: wanasapu
- Malayalam: kattuchempakam (കാട്ടുചെമ്പകം)
