= Henry Noltie =

British botanist

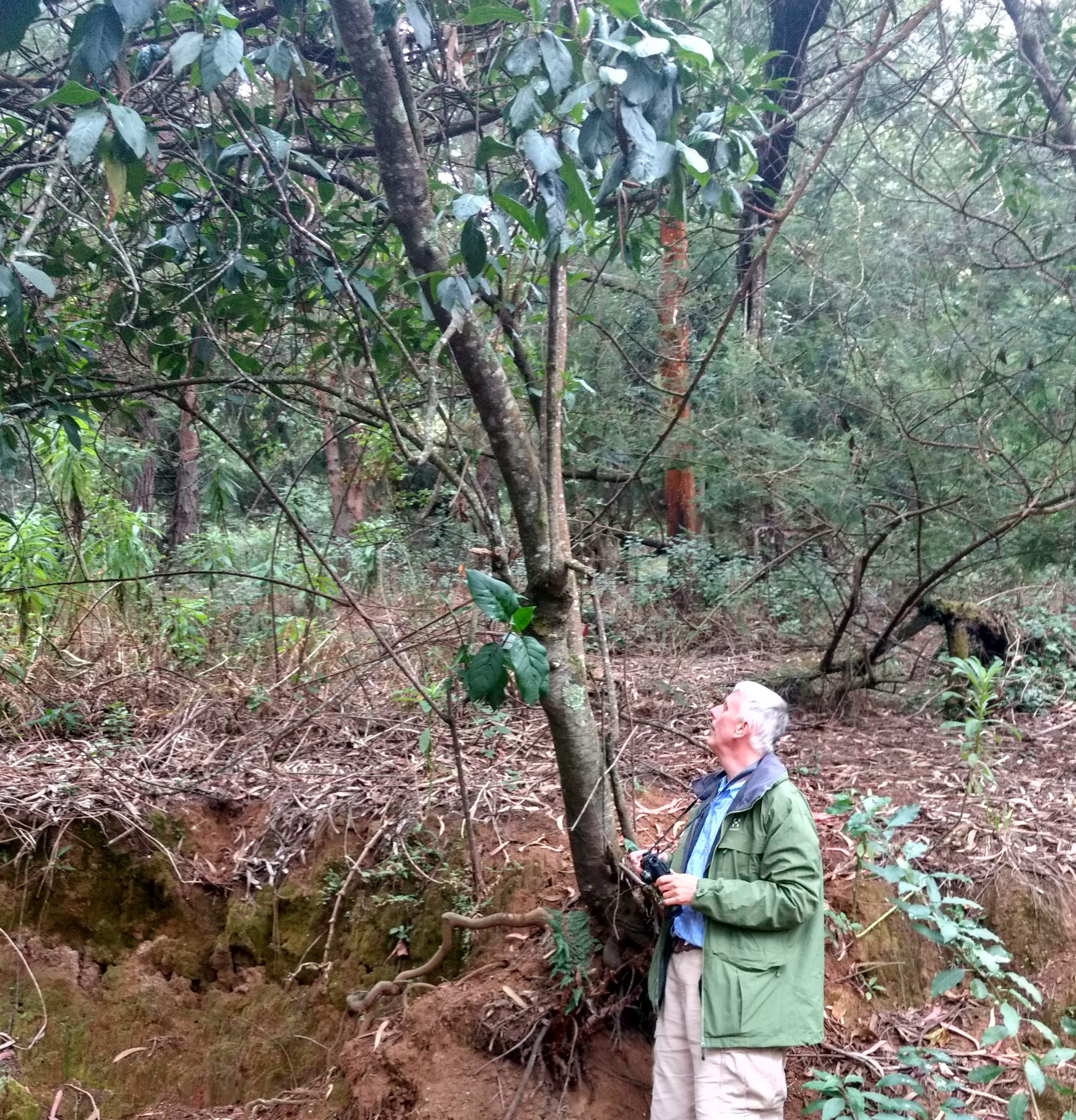
- Henry Noltie examining a Cinchona tree in the Nilgiris, 2016
- Born: Henry John Noltie
- Education: Ph.D. University of Edinburgh Botany University of Oxford Museum Studies University of Leicester
- Occupation: Botanist

Henry Noltie (born 1957) is a British botanist. He worked as a curator and taxonomist at Royal Botanic Garden Edinburgh.

== Life and career ==
=== Education and work ===
Noltie studied botany at the University of Oxford, and Museum Studies at Leicester. He joined RBGE in 1986. For 14 years he worked on the Flora of Bhutan project, leading the team for its concluding years. He wrote two of the volumes of the Flora, relating to the monocots, for which he received a Ph.D. from the University of Edinburgh.

=== Books ===
In 1998, while working in the RBGE library, Noltie discovered thousands of botanical illustrations and a series of mounted herbarium specimens stamped with the words “Cleghorn Memorial Library”. Noltie's research lead him to the University of St Andrews library and to other parts of the RBGE archive where he began to piece together the life story of one of the 19th century's most significant botanists, Hugh Cleghorn.

In 1999, Noltie wrote Indian Botanical Drawings 1793-1868 from the Royal Botanic Garden Edinburgh published by Royal Botanic Garden Edinburgh.

He subsequently wrote The Dapuri Drawings. Alexander Gibson and The Bombay Botanic Garden was published by The Antique Collectors' Club in association with the Royal Botanic Garden Edinburgh in 2002.

In 2007, Noltie wrote Robert Wight and the Botanical Drawings of Rungiah & Govindoo, a 3-volume monograph documenting the important collections of Indian botanical drawings in the Library of the Royal Botanic Garden Edinburgh. Book 1, The Life and Work of Robert Wight, provided the definitive biography of Wight. Book 2, Botanical Drawings by Rungia & Govindoo: the Wight Collection. Book 3, Journeys in Search of Robert Wight, described the author's travels as he carried out the research that underpinned his work.

His book Raffles' Ark Redrawn: Natural History Drawings from the Collection of Sir Thomas Stamford Raffles was published in 2009 by the British Library and Royal Botanic Garden Edinburgh.

Noltie edited and wrote the introduction for Wild Flowers: A Sketchbook by the father-and-son team: Canon Raven (1885-1964) theologian, naturalist, and historian of science, and his son John (1914-1980) a classics don and passionate field botanist.

In 2016, he published Indian Forester, Scottish Laird - The Botanical Lives of Hugh Cleghorn of Stravithie and The Cleghorn Collection: South Indian Botanical Drawings 1845 to 1860.

In 2017, Noltie wrote about the links between the Royal Botanic Garden Edinburgh and India in his book Botanical Art from India.

Noltie contributed to the book Forgotten Masters: Indian Painting for the East India Company which accompanied the first UK exhibition at the Wallace Collection, London of works by Indian master painters commissioned by East India Company officials.
