= Mukurthi National Park =

National park in India

- IUCN category II (national park)
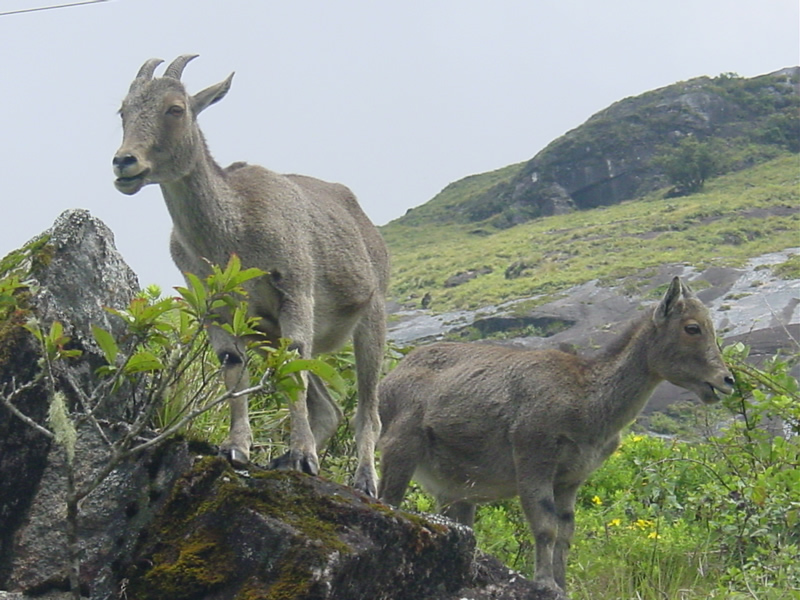
- Nilgiri tahr in montane grasslands

- Location within Tamil Nadu Location within India
- Interactive map of Mukurthi National Park
- Location: Nilgiri District, Tamil Nadu
- Coordinates: 11°16′N 76°28.5′E
- Area: 78.46 km^{2} (30.29 sq mi)
- Elevation: 2629
- Established: 12 December 2001

Mukurthi National Park is a 78.46 km^{2} (30.29 sq mi) national park in the western Nilgiris mountains of Tamil Nadu in South India. It was created to protect its keystone species, the Nilgiri tahr. It is part of Nilgiri Biosphere Reserve, India's first International Biosphere Reserve. As part of the Western Ghats, it is a UNESCO World Heritage Site since 1 July 2012. It is characterised by montane grasslands and shrublands interspersed with sholas, high rainfall, near-freezing temperatures and strong winds. It harbours Bengal tiger and Asian elephant.

== History ==
Mukukurthi National Park boundary

Native hill tribe communities including the Toda people have harvested firewood from the sholas and grazed their animals including the hill buffalo for centuries. Indiscriminate felling of the sholas started with the establishment of British settlements in Ootacamund, Coonoor and Wellington in the early 19th century. Beginning in 1841 authorities issued contracts to bidders to fell wood from specific sholas in a 'timber conservancy' program. In 1868 James Breeds, commissioner of the Hills, wrote: "...unless conservancy is taken in hand and organized under some efficient system under the control of an experienced officer, the destruction of the sholas is but a question of time."

Bangitappal (Cannabis tableland), at the southwest end of the park at the confluence of two streams at the head of the Sispara Pass, used to be a halting place on the old Sispara ghat road from Kozhikode to Ooty, constructed in 1832. This pass provided a short land route for postal runners from Ooty to the west coast in the 19th century and was used for smuggling of cannabis, tobacco and later salt. A forest rest house and a trekkers shed built there in 1930 are now used by park staff and visiting researchers.

Between 1840 and 1856 plantations of several non-native tree species were introduced to the area to satisfy the fuel-wood demand. These included four wattle species (black wattle, silver wattle, green wattle and blackwood), eucalyptus, cypress, Indian long leaf pine and thorny gorse. Eucalyptus became the preferred plantation tree.

Unlike the others, the wattles spread by root suckers to quickly cover large areas of native grasslands, including the Mukurthi Hills, and was declared a pest "useful for covering wastelands". Some black wattle plantations were maintained for the leather industry, as their bark yielded tannin.

In 1882 Inspector General of Forests, Dietrich Brandis "recommended bringing the present 1,200 acres (4.9 km^{2}) of plantation up to 5,000 acres (20 km^{2}) to create enormous forest blocks "...which would make any remaining sholas redundant forest resources". The entire area of MNP, was declared as a Reserve forest in 1886.

In 1920 it was suggested that 10–15 acre plots in the Kundah Hills including the present park area, "be planted up each year in places where sholas have almost or quite disappeared, the most suitable species probably being Acacia dealbata (silver wattle)", thus replacing highly diverse endemic and stable ecosystems with an exotic monoculture supporting little animal diversity.

The area was declared as a wildlife sanctuary on 3 August 1982 and upgraded to a National Park on 15 October 1990 in order to protect the Nilgiri tahr.

== Geography ==
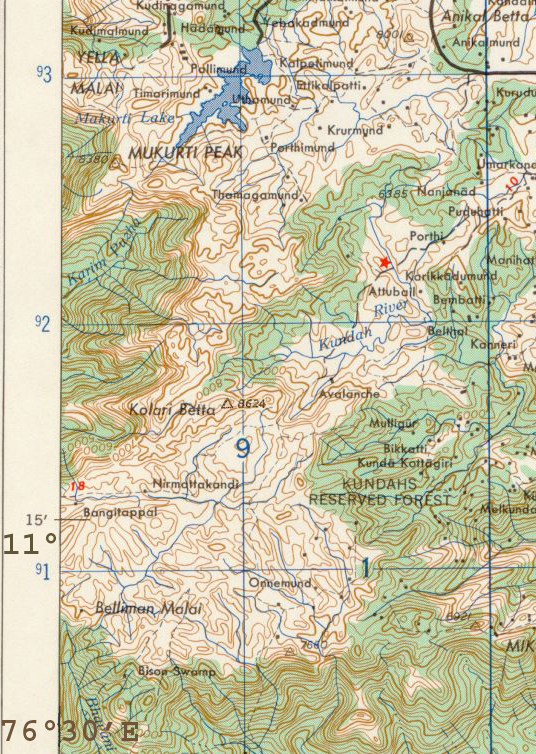
Mukurthi National Park topographic map 1:250,000

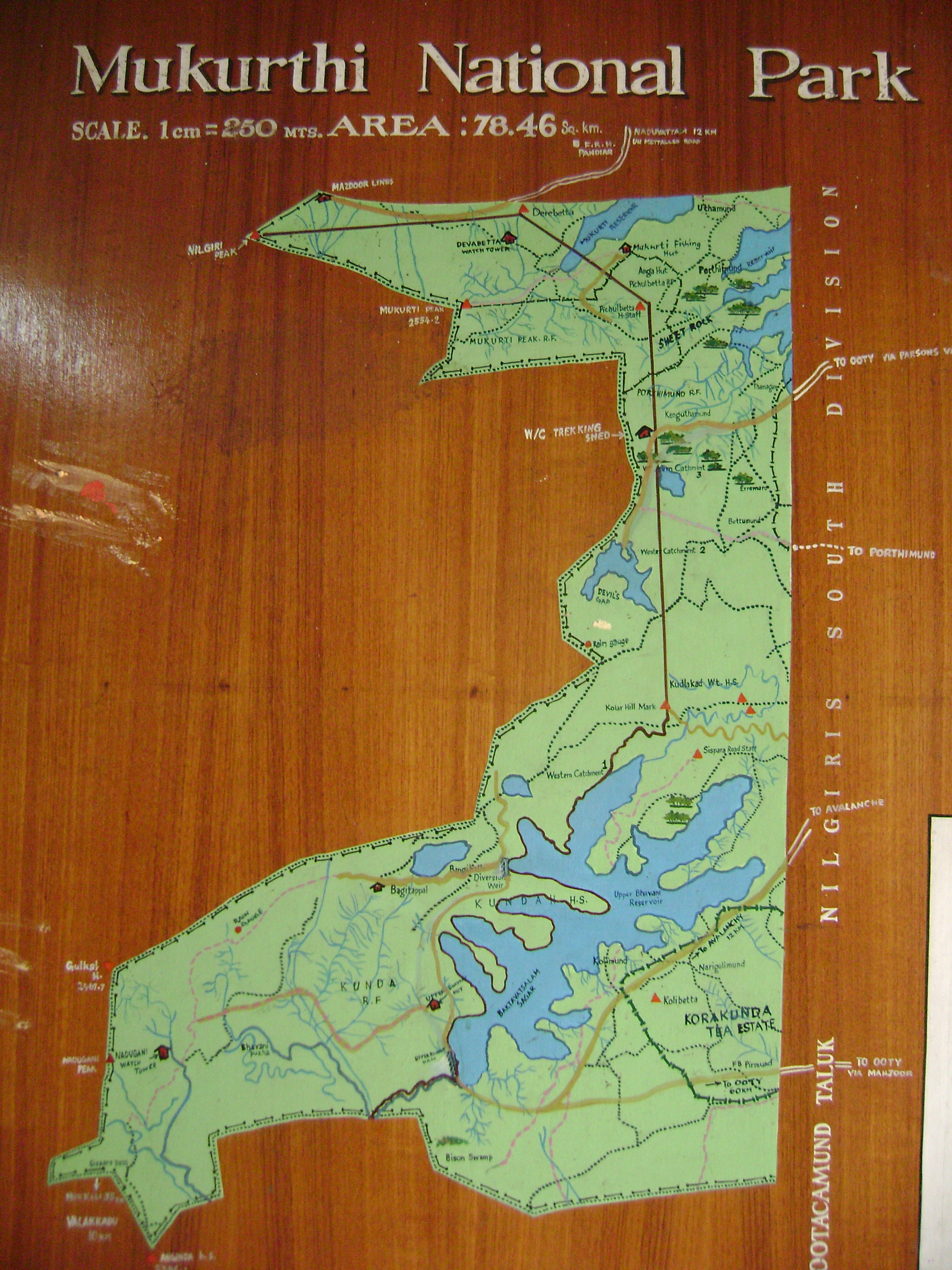
Mukurthi National Park boundaries and features map

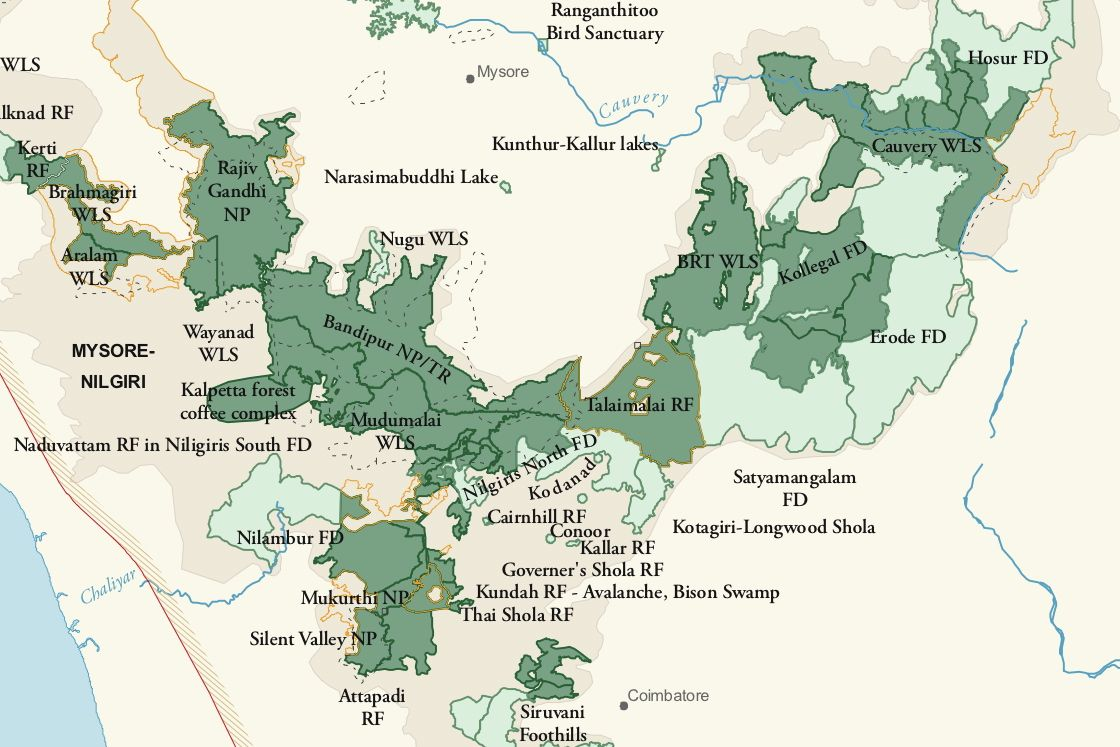
Map of Nilgiris Biosphere Reserve, showing Mukurthi National Park in relation to multiple contiguous protected areas

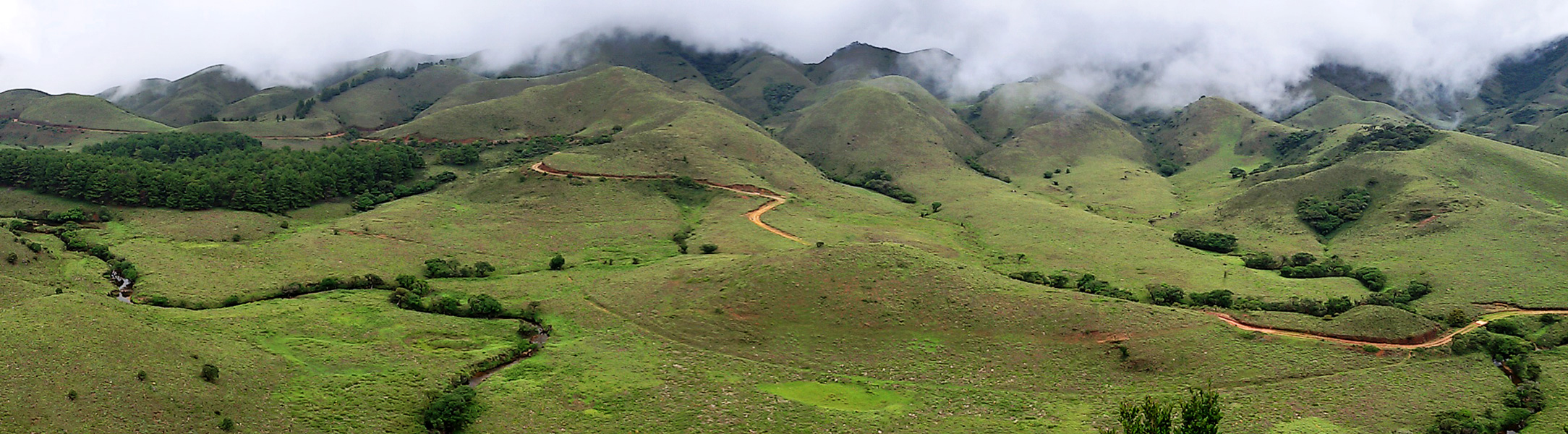
Mukurthi National Park, the Nilgiris, Tamil Nadu, India. A lovely tapestry of southern high mountain grasslands

Mukurthi National Park has an elongated crescent shape facing to the west between 11°10' to 11°22' N and 76°26' to 76°34' E. It is bordered on the west by Nilambur South Forest Division, to the northwest by Gudalur Forest Division, to the northeast, east and southeast by Nilgiri South Forest Division and to the south by Mannarghat Forest Division. At its southwest tip the peaks of this park straddle the northeast corner of Silent Valley National Park of Kerala.

On the Nilgiri Plateau, the Kundah range of the Nilgiri hills is a ridge on the south-western side of Mukurthi National Park bordering Kerala. The Tamil Nadu/Kerala border here is 39 km long. The park generally slopes towards the east and south receiving water from the Billithadahalla, Pykara and Kundah rivers, and the Upper Bhavani and Mukurthi reservoirs which flow through the park. Also several perennial streams originate in the park, most of which drain into the Bhavani River.

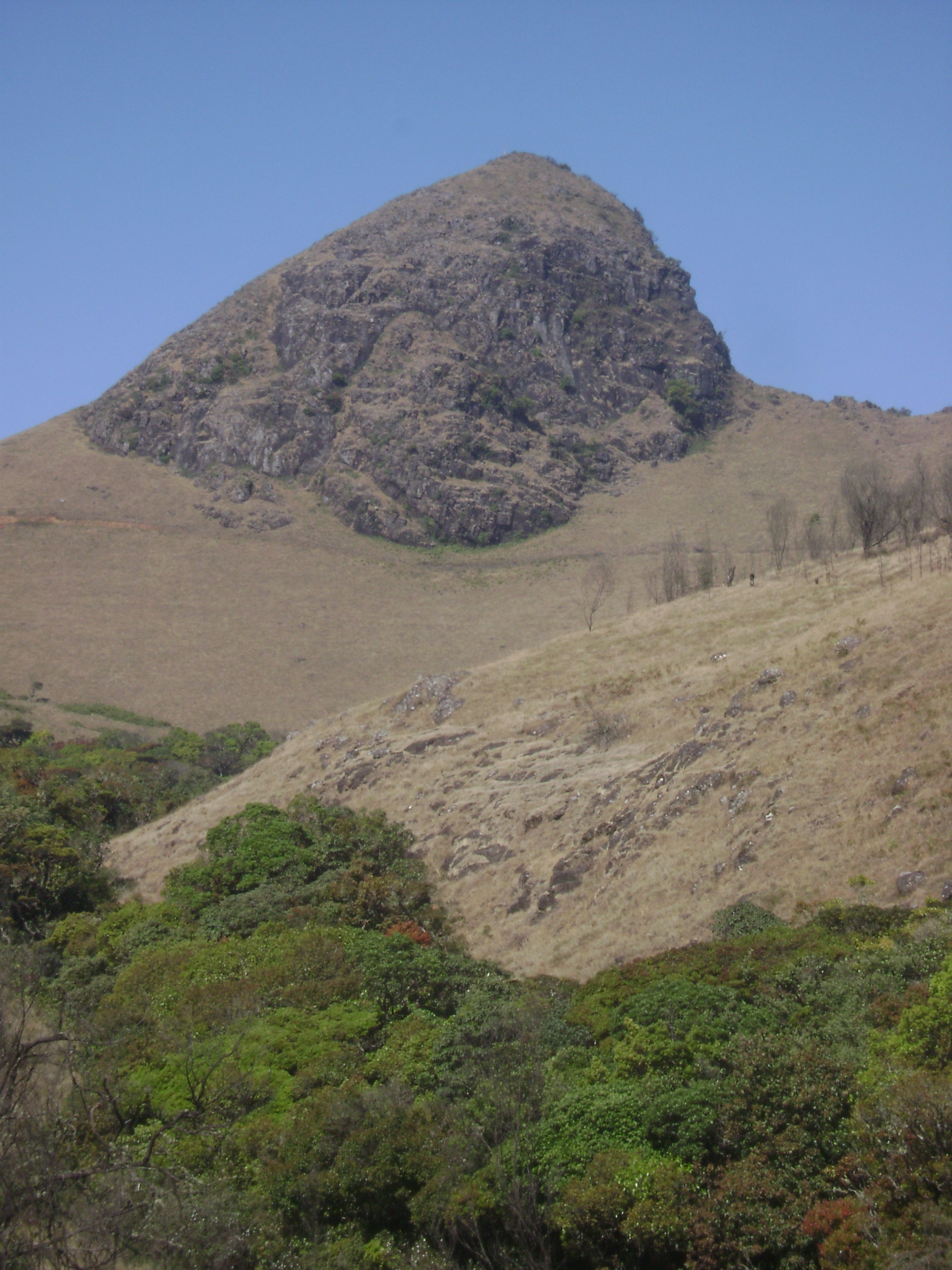
Mukurthi Peak elevation: 2554 m.

Park elevation varies from 1,500 m (4,900 ft) to 2,629 m (8,625 ft), with Kollaribetta 2,629 m (8,625 ft), Mukurthi 2,554 m (8,379 ft), and Nilgiri 2,476 m (8,123 ft) being the highest peaks in this part of Nilgiri District, Tamil Nadu. With elevations greater than the general level of the plateau, the range possesses some peaks close to the height of Doddabetta, just east of Ooty. Avalanche hill of this range has twin-peaks of the Kudikkadu (height: 2,590 metres (8,497 ft)) and the Kolaribetta. Derbetta (or Bear Hill) (height: 2,531 metres (8,304 ft)) and Kolibetta (height: 2,494 metres (8,182 ft)), south of the Ouchterlony valley, are a continuation of the Kundah range.

Pichalbetta (height: 2,544 metres (8,346 ft)), Nilgiri Peak and Mukurthi Peak are the important heights of this area. Though not the highest hills in the Nilgiris, these three hills stand out in relation to the generally uniform level of this area.

Important peaks in the southwest Sispara/Bangitipal part of the park are Sispara (height: 2,206 metres (7,238 ft)) Anginda (height: 2,383 metres (7,818 ft)), Nadugani (height: 2,320 metres (7,612 ft)) and Gulkal (height: 2,468 metres (8,097 ft)).

The park has a harsh environment with annual rainfall varying from 2010 mm to 6330 mm (79–249 inches), night temperature sometimes below freezing in the winter and wind speeds ranging up to 120 km/h (75 mph). page 13

== Fauna ==
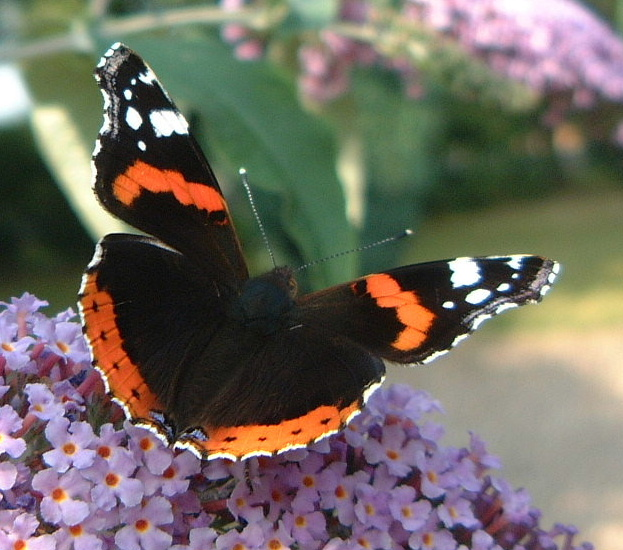
Indian red admiral

Several threatened mammal species live here including Nilgiri tahr, Indian elephant, Bengal tiger, Nilgiri marten, Nilgiri langur and Bonhote's mouse. Mukurthi is near the northern end of the range of the Nilgiri tahr. A three-day census in March 2007 estimated 200 tahrs in the park including 60 young ones sighted. There are also leopard, bonnet macaque, sambar deer, barking deer, mouse deer, otter, jungle cat, small Indian civet, wild dog, jackal, black-naped hare, shrew, Malabar spiny dormouse and soft-furred rat.

Avifauna consists mostly of hill birds including the threatened Nilgiri laughingthrush, Malabar whistling thrush, Eurasian woodcock, Nilgiri wood pigeon, black-and-orange flycatcher, Nilgiri flycatcher, grey-headed canary flycatcher black bulbul, Indian white-eye and Nilgiri pipit. The predatory black-winged kite, common kestrel and black eagle may be seen in the grasslands.

The area is home to many species of point-endemics among reptiles such as the geckos dwarf gecko, Nilgiri salea (Salea horsfieldii) and the skink (Kaestlea bilineata) the snakes horseshoe pit viper, checkered keelback, rat snake, Oligodon venustus, bronze-headed vine snake and several shieldtails of which Perrotet's shieldtail is the most common. Like reptiles, almost all species of amphibians here are endemic only to this region, except the widespread common Indian toad (Duttaphrynus melanostictus); main species include Bufo microtympanum and many species of tree frogs including Raorchestes tinniens, Raorchestes signatus, Raorchestes ravii, Raorchestes thodai, Raorchestes primarrumpfi, Ghatixalus variabilis and the dancing frog Micrixalus phyllophilus and aquatic ones like Nyctibatrachus indraneili and Fejervarya nilagirica.

Butterflies with Himalayan affinity like the blue admiral, Indian red admiral, Indian fritillary, Indian cabbage white and hedge blues are seen here. Some streams had been stocked with exotic rainbow trout in the past.

== Flora ==
The area is home to numerous endemic plants particularly of the scapigerous annual Impatiens plants. Alchemilla indica and Hedyotis verticillaris are found only within or on the fringes of this park.

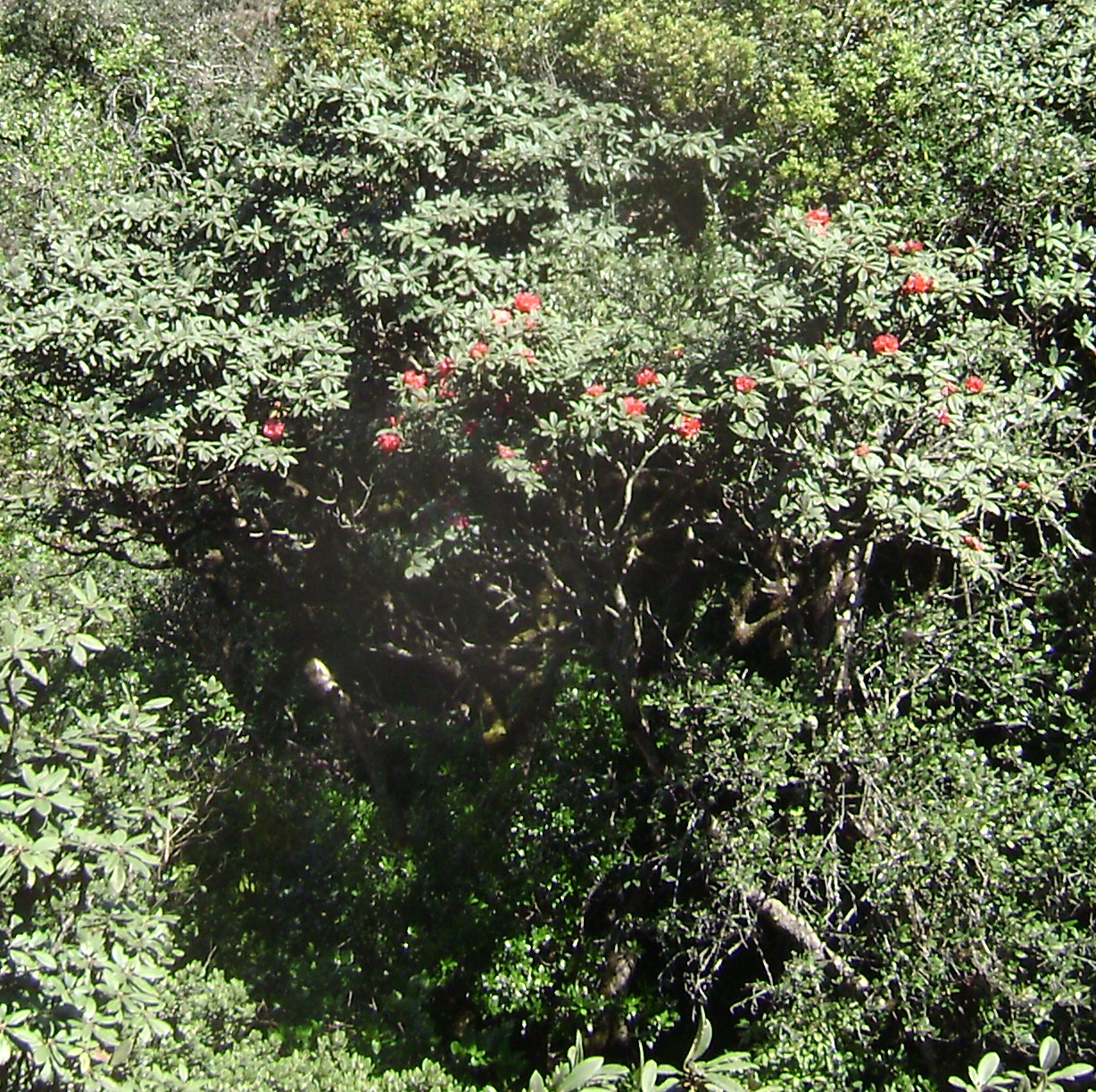
Rhododendron tree in shola

Rhododendrons, Rhododendron arboreum the national flower of Nepal or Rhododendron nilagiricum, are seen throughout the grasslands and very large specimens are conspicuous around many sholas. Other common shola trees and shrubs among the 58 species found here include: Syzygium calophyllifolium, Daphniphyllum neilgherrense, Cinnamomum wightii, Vaccinium leschenaulti, Mahonia leschenaulti, Litsea sp., Lasianthus sp., Psychotria sp. and Michelia nilagirica.

Wild yellow raspberries grow on the edge of sholas and in disturbed soil along trails and roads

The edges of most sholas are lined with the shrubs: Gaultheria fragrantissima, Rhodomyrtus tomentosa, Rubus sp., Bergeris tinctoria, Eurya nitida, Strobilanthes sp., and Helichrysum sp.

The orchids Eria abliflora, Oberonia santapaui, Aerides ringens, Aerides crispa and Coelogyne odoratissima are found on the high west edge of the park. Among the grasslands are a plethora of Brachycorythis iantha, Satyrium nepalense, Habenaria cephalotes, Seidenfia densiflora, Spiranthes sinensis and Liparis atropurpurea. The natural habitats of the park have been much disturbed by previously easy motor vehicle access through four entry points and extensive commercial planting and natural spreading of non-native eucalyptus and wattle (Acacia dealbata, Acacia mearnsii and other species). In addition there is one large, and several smaller hydro-electric impoundments in the area.

Only 20% of the park area has more than a 50% chance of being used by tahr. If old commercial forests are removed and restored to their original grassland habitat, usable tahr habitat would increase to 60%.

== Management ==
Mukurthi National Park is managed by the Tamil Nadu Department of Forestry with the main objective to conserve the endangered shola-grassland ecosystem and its endemic flora and fauna. The department operates an effective year round anti-poaching program with gun- and radio-equipped foot patrols operating from anti-poaching camps at Bangitappal, Nadugani, Western Catchment and Mukurthi Fishing Hut.

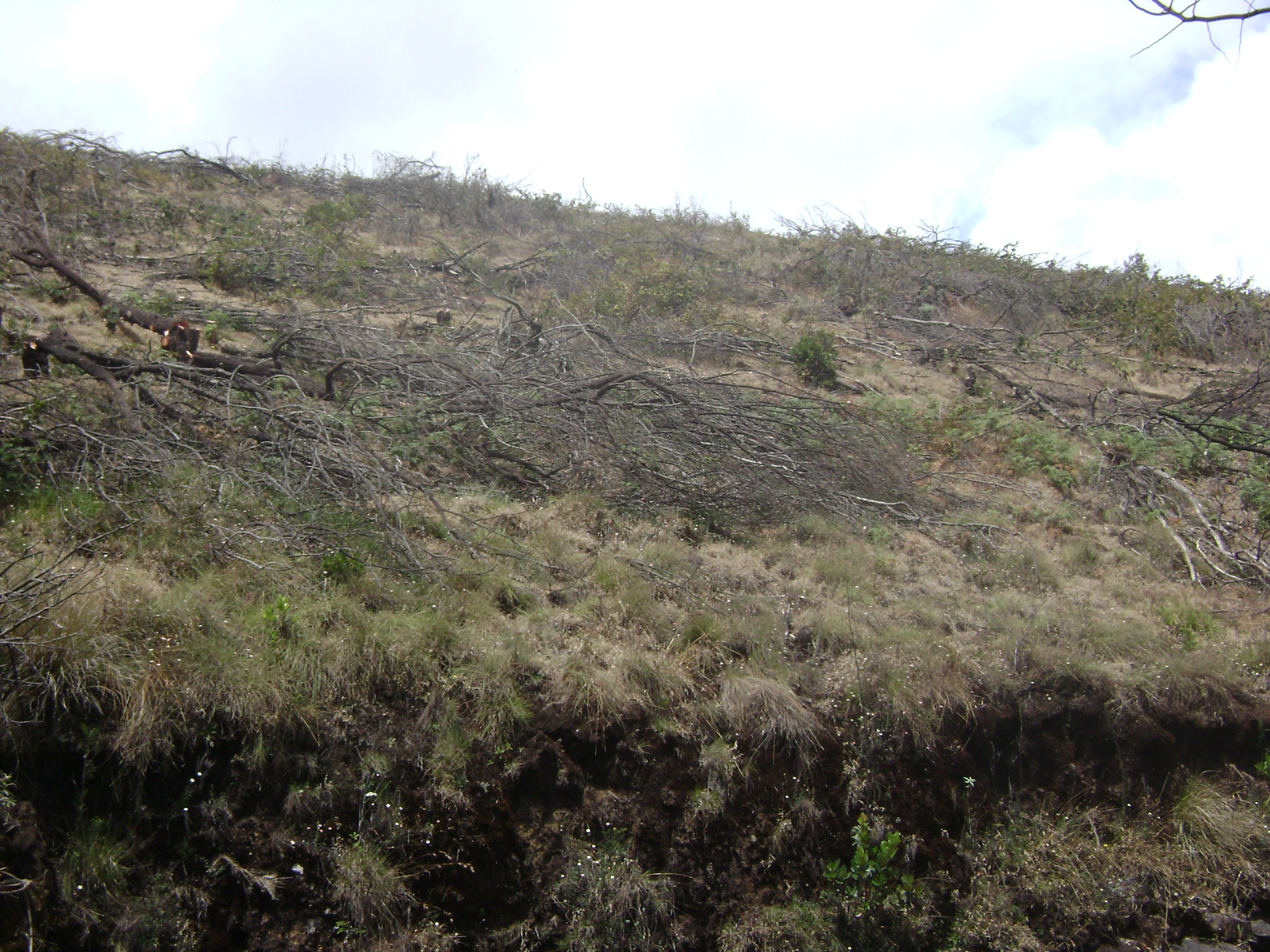
Grassland restoration from old wattle forest

Prevention and control of destructive wildfire is achieved through creation of artificial firebreaks in the form of hand-dug fire lines along ridges and cleared trek paths. Local fire watchers are employed for early detection and control during the dangerous December to April fire season. Invasive imported plant species, especially wattle, Scotch broom and gorse are controlled and eliminated from the park through a phased, long-term program focused on restoration of the original biota.

Tourism is not a management objective, but the Forest Department does periodically conduct nature awareness and conservation programs for the public and some special interest groups through controlled visits to the Western Catchment and Avalanche areas of the park.

The Forest Department seeks to identify and acquire contiguous undisturbed crucial habitat areas for future inclusion in the park.

== Visitor information ==
Management sign at Upper Bhavani entrance

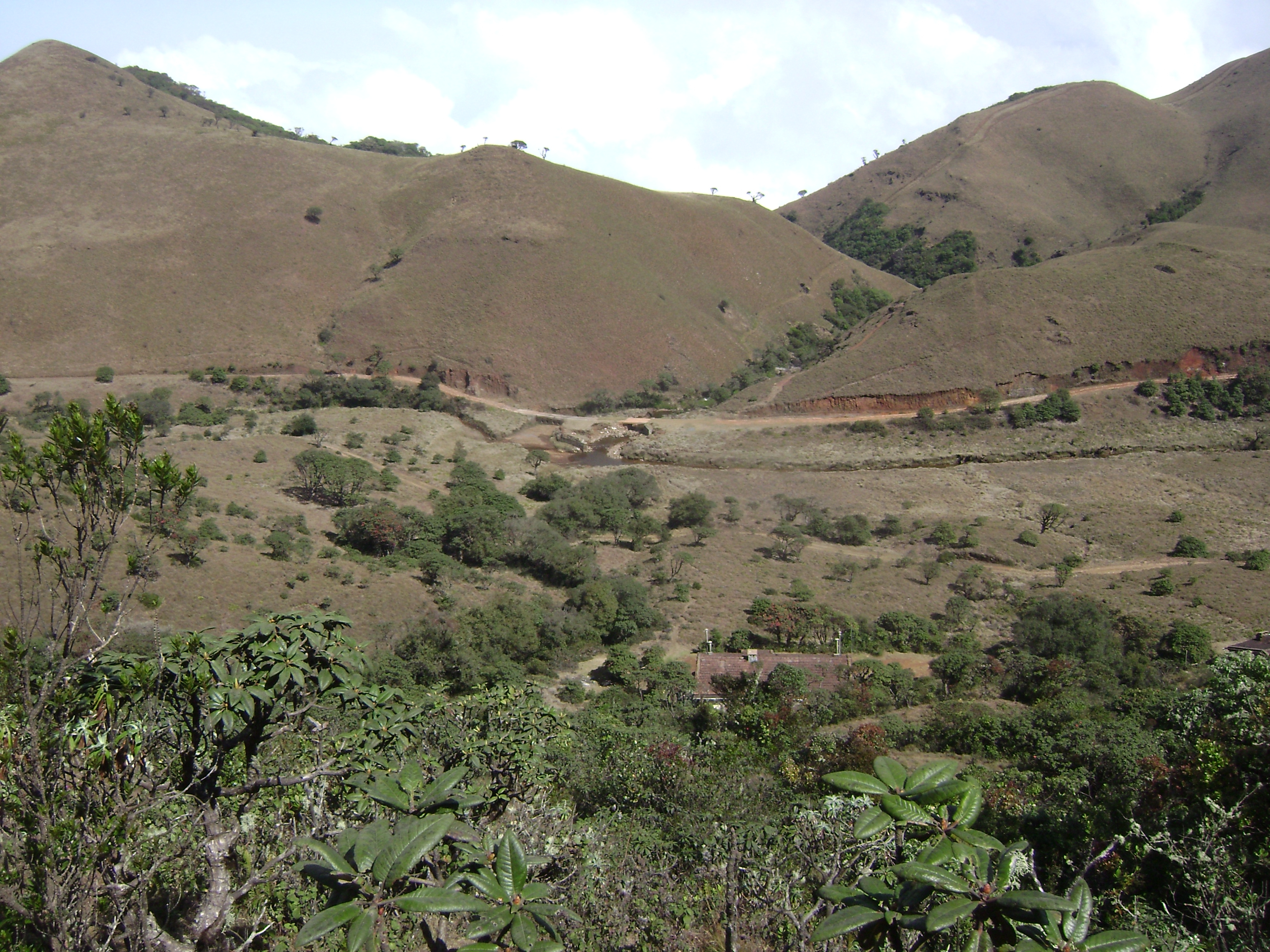
Bangitappal rest house and surroundings

Casual tourism and commercial tour operation is not permitted. Tourist facilities are not available in the park. Special interest groups are sometimes permitted for supervised educational programs, trekking and camping. There are forest rest houses at Bangitapal, Avalanche, Pykara and some unfurnished trekking sheds.

A mostly downhill three-, four- or five-day trek through Mukurthi and Silent Valley National Parks starts by driving 75 km from Udhagamandalam (Ooty) in 4 hours and a 1 km walk to overnight at Bangitapal. Walk 24 km through Mukurthi Park in 9 hours to overnight at Walakkad or overnight half-way at the new trekkers bungalow at Sispara peak then continue 12 km steep downhill the next day to Walakkad. Walk 18 km in 7 hours to overnight at Poochipara. Walk 8 km in 3 hours to Sairandhiri in Silent Valley, then take a park van out or overnight at Sairandhri and trek 23 km to Mukkali village. A forest guide-cum-cook accompanies park visitors during all treks. In some cases the guide may instruct visitors to bend down to drink straight from a stream like a deer and prohibit bathing in a stream so the silt at the bottom is not disturbed and because human body odour might affect the animals.

Beginning in November 2007, the Forest Department has organised trekking programmes inside forest areas of Mukurthi Park with the objective to familiarise the public with their conservation efforts. The places covered by treks are Mudimund, Mukurthi Peak, Western Catchment, Bangitapal, Moyar, Anaikatti, Morganbetta, Avalanchi, Kolleribetta, Sispara and Silent Valley. Trek distances vary between 8 km and 60 km. Each group comprises up to 20 members. Guides, instructors, cooks, porters, tents and food are provided by the department. Trekkers have to bring rucksacks and sleeping bags. Application for trekking permits can be made to the range officer.

The nearest airport is Coimbatore (140 km away). The nearest railway station is Udhagamandalam (45 km away). The best seasons are February to May and September to November.

== See also ==
- 100+ Photographs of Mukurthi National Park on flickr.com
