= Kolaribetta =

Second highest peak in Nilgiri hills, Western Ghats, Tamil Nadu, India

Coordinates: 11.291°N 76.550°E

Kolaribetta is the second highest peak in the Nilgiri hills of the Western Ghats, located in Tamil Nadu, India.

It is situated in Udagamandalam taluk of Nilgiris district, Tamil Nadu.

It is the highest point in the Mukurthi National Park and Chaliyar river basin. It stands at an altitude of 2,630m above sea level.

It is a shelter for Nilgiri Langur, Nilgiri Tahr and Nilgiri Marten.

Other major peaks nearby are Doddabetta, Kudikadu (2,590m), Mukurthi (2,554 m), Pichallbetta (2,544m), Derbetta (2,531m) and Snowdon (2,531m).
