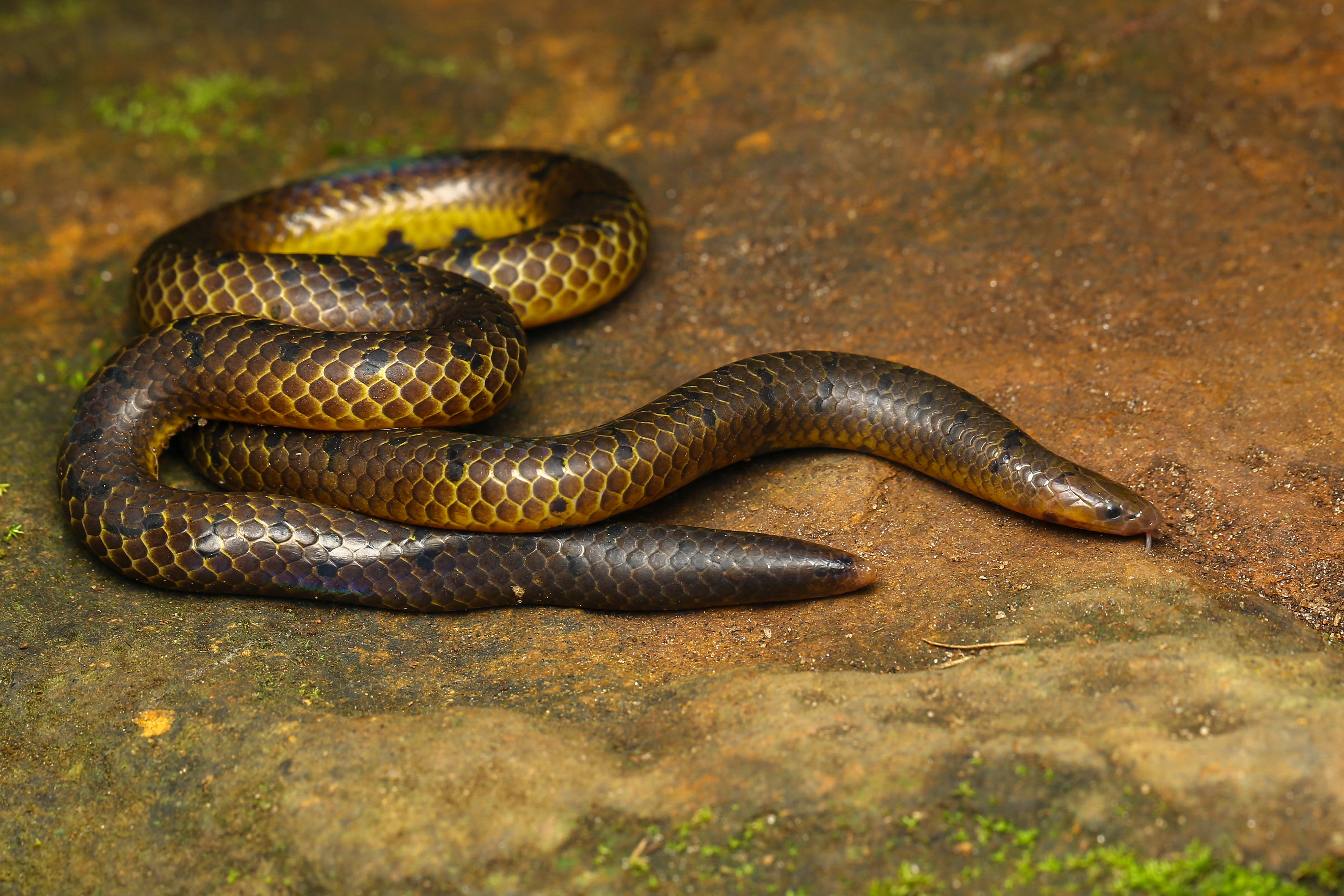

Conservation status
- Data Deficient (IUCN 3.1)

Scientific classification
- Kingdom: Animalia
- Phylum: Chordata
- Class: Reptilia
- Order: Squamata
- Suborder: Serpentes
- Family: Uropeltidae
- Genus: Plectrurus
- Species: P. aureus

Binomial name
- Plectrurus aureus Beddome, 1880

= Plectrurus aureus =

Species of snake

Plectrurus aureus, commonly known as the Kerala burrowing snake or Kerala shield-tail snake, is a species of uropeltid snake endemic to India.

== Geographic range ==
It is found in southwestern India in the Western Ghats.

Type locality: "Chambra mountain in Wynad, near Kalpatty - one under an old rotten log at 6,000 feet elevation, the other under a large stone at 4,500 feet, both in heavy evergreen forest".

== Description ==
Dorsum gold-colored, the scales edged with violet; a few irregular narrow violet-black crossbars may be present. Ventrum brighter gold-colored, with violet-black crossbands or alternating spots.

Adults may attain a total length of 40 cm (15 3/4 in).

Ventrals 164–177; subcaudals 8–12.

Scalation very similar to Plectrurus guentheri, except the ventrals are two times as broad as the contiguous scales. Diameter of body 39 to 44 times in the total length.
