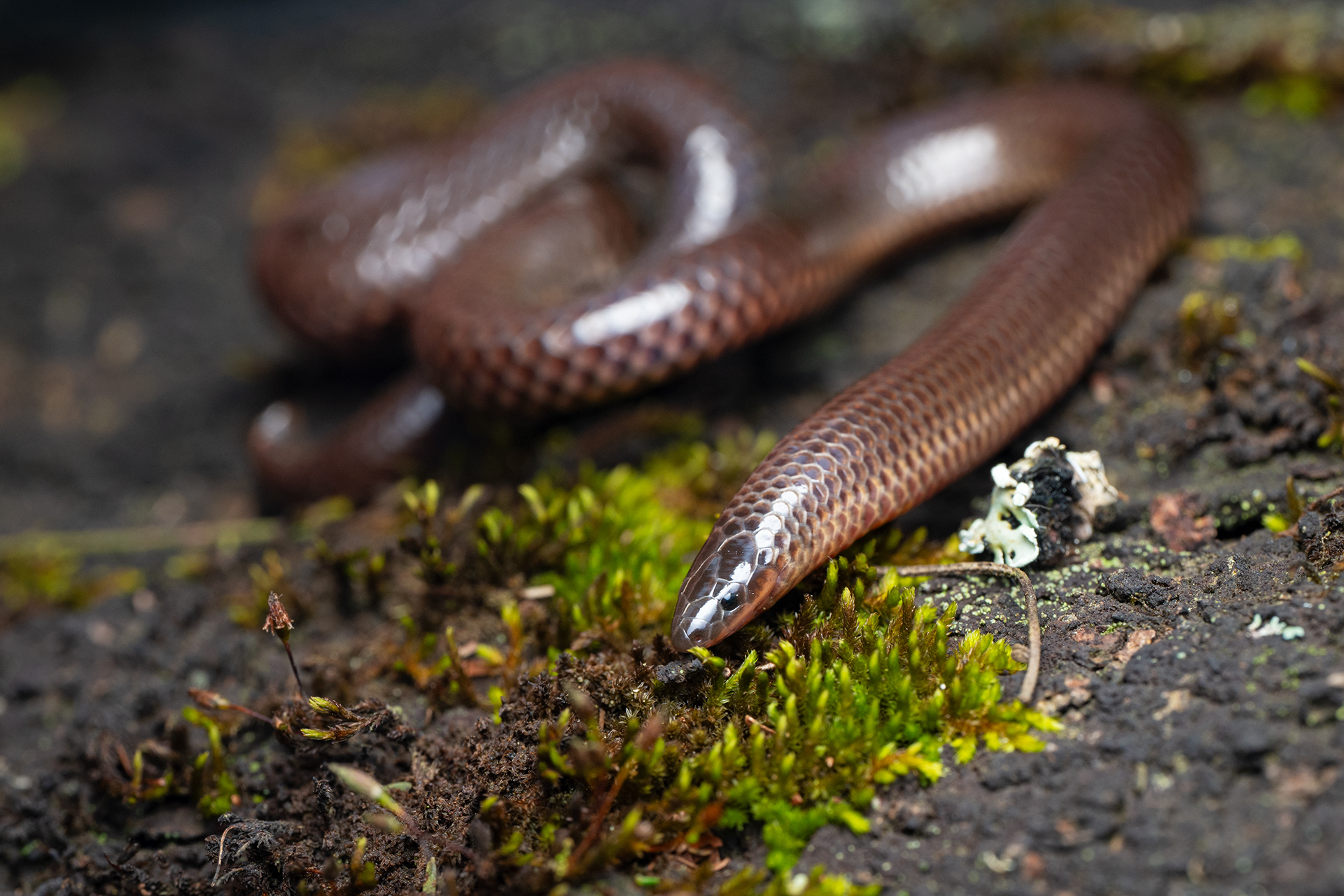
- Perrotet's shieldtail, Plectrurus perrotetii

Scientific classification
- Kingdom: Animalia
- Phylum: Chordata
- Class: Reptilia
- Order: Squamata
- Suborder: Serpentes
- Family: Uropeltidae
- Genus: Plectrurus; A.H.A. Duméril, 1851

Synonyms
- Plectrurus A.H.A. Duméril In A.M.C. Duméril & A.H.A. Duméril, 1851; Maudia Gray, 1858; Plectrurus - Boulenger, 1890; Pseudoplectrurus Boulenger, 1890; Plectrurus - Mahendra, 1984

= Plectrurus =

Genus of burrowing snakes endemic to South India

Common names: burrowing snakes

Plectrurus is a genus of nonvenomous shield-tail snakes endemic to the Western Ghats of South India. Currently, three species are recognized. They inhabit high-elevation montane Shola forests and are usually found under fallen logs and rocks. Some species are rare, while some are quite common in their range.

== Description ==
Small snakes, they do not exceed 43 cm (17 in).

An ocular shield covers the eye. The eyes are small, with a diameter not more than half the length of the ocular shield. The tail is laterally compressed. The terminal scute also is laterally compressed, with two superposed points. The points are simple, bifid, or trifid.

== Species ==
Species	Taxon author	Common name	Geographic range
Plectrurus aureus	Beddome, 1880	golden shield-tail snake	Southern India in Coonoor, the Nilgiris, Tamil Nadu In October 2020, two specimens were found by 10-year-old Dhruv Gowda. A sighting of this snake had not been recorded in 140 years. This snake was last claimed to have been seen at the Chubra Hills in Wayanad, Kerala, in 1880. No sightings had been recorded since the 1880 sighting at the Chubra Hills.
Plectrurus guentheri	Beddome, 1863	Günther's shield-tail snake	Southern India in the Western Ghats: Sispara Ghat on the west side of the Nilgiri Hills
Plectrurus perrotetii^{T}	A.H.A. Duméril, 1851	Perrotet's shield-tail snake	Southern India in the Western Ghats: the Nilgiri Hills, where it is a common species

- ) Not including the nominate subspecies

^{T}) Type species
