= Bangitappal =

Valley in Tamil Nadu, India

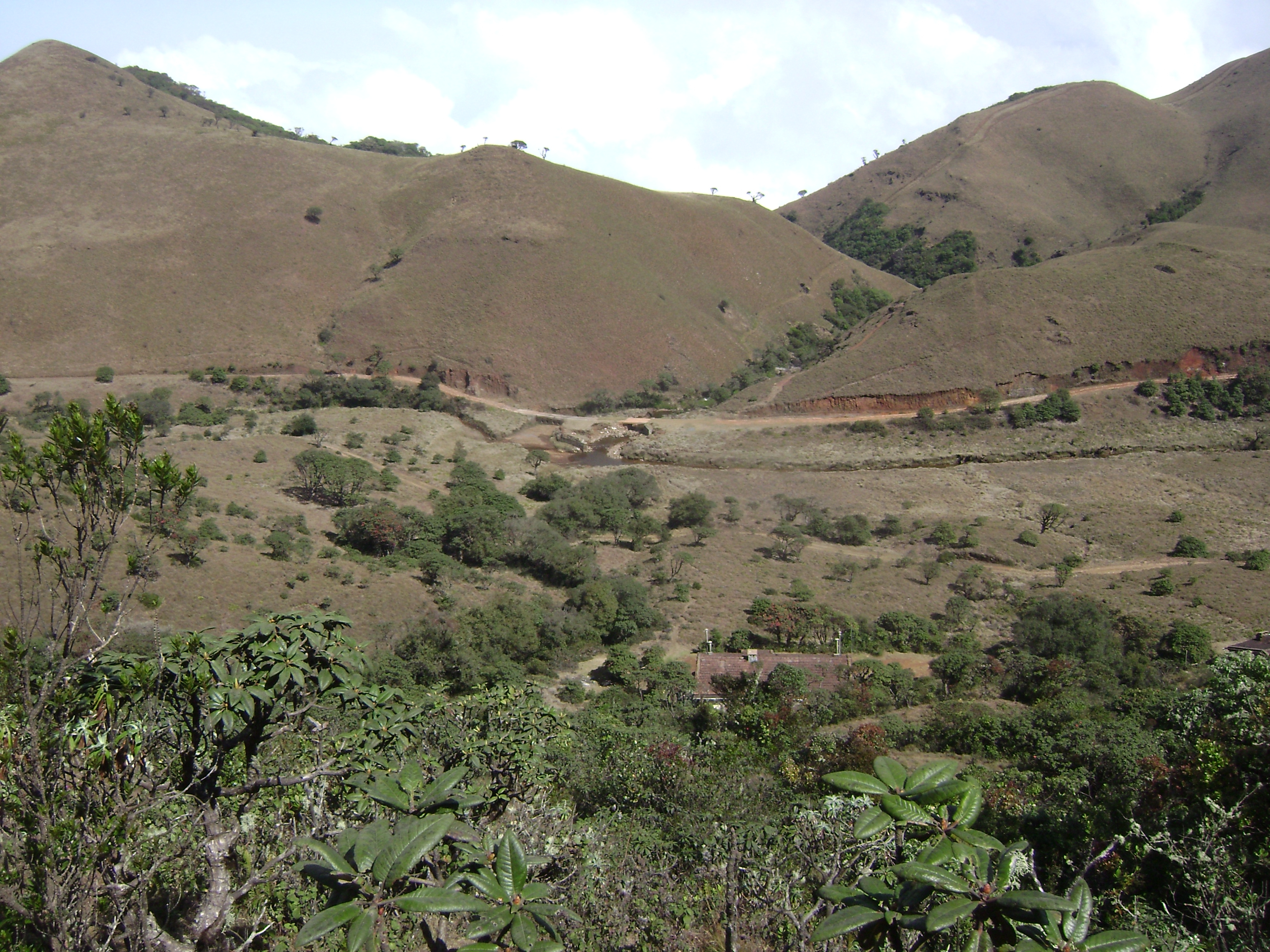
Bangitipal Rest House and surroundings

Bangitappal (Cannabis tableland), is a valley in the southwest end of Mukurthi National Park located at: 11°15.39′N 76°30.33′E, elevation: 2,580 m (8,460 ft) at the confluence of two streams at the head of the Sispara Pass in the Western Ghats mountain range in Tamil Nadu in South India. A forest rest house and a trekkers shed built there in 1930 are now used by park staff and visiting researchers.

A rough 5 km (3.1 mi) jeep road leads there from the Upper Bhavani Dam. This valley also contains a dam made from dirt.
