= Sispara day gecko =

Conservation status
- Near Threatened (IUCN 3.1)

Scientific classification
- Kingdom: Animalia
- Phylum: Chordata
- Class: Reptilia
- Order: Squamata
- Suborder: Gekkota
- Family: Gekkonidae
- Genus: Cnemaspis
- Species: C. sisparensis

Binomial name
- Cnemaspis sisparensis (Beddome, 1870)

Synonyms
- Cnemaspis anaikattiensis (Mukherjee, Bhupathy & Nixon, 2005); Gonatodes bireticulatus (Annandale, 1915)

Species of lizard

The Sispara day gecko (Cnemaspis sisparensis) is a species of gecko found in the Nilgiri Hills of India.

== Description ==
It is closely allied to Cnemaspis wynadensis, but the digits much more elongate. Three femoral pores are found on each side. The dorsal tubercles are homogeneous. In color, it is brown, with regular, transverse, dark bands across the body and tail.

From snout to vent, it grows to 2.4 in.

Its type locality is Sholakal, near the bottom of the Sispara Ghat, Nilgiri Hills.
