= Syzygium calophyllifolium =

Conservation status
- Endangered (IUCN 3.1)

Scientific classification
- Kingdom: Plantae
- Clade: Tracheophytes
- Clade: Angiosperms
- Clade: Eudicots
- Clade: Rosids
- Order: Myrtales
- Family: Myrtaceae
- Genus: Syzygium
- Species: S. calophyllifolium

Binomial name
- Syzygium calophyllifolium (Wight) Walp.

Synonyms
- Eugenia calophyllifolia Wight

Species of flowering plant

Syzygium calophyllifolium, also known as the pretty-leaved plum, neerodum, or Nilgiri wild jamun is a species of plant in the family Myrtaceae. It is an evergreen tree native to the Western Ghats and Sri Lanka, where it grows in shola forests.

== Description ==
Syzygium calophyllifolium is a medium-sized tree that can grow up to 20 m (66 ft) and has rough bark. It grows white corymbose flowers and produces dark purple berries, which are edible.

=== Phytochemistry ===
Syzygium calophyllifolium's fruit contains high amounts of phenolics, tannins, and flavonoids. The leaves contain high levels of sesquiterpenoids and triterpenoids.

== Distribution ==
Syzygium calophyllifolium grows in shola forests in altitudes between 700 and 2,300 m (2,300 and 7,500 ft) above sea level.

== Ecology ==
Syzygium calophyllifolium is considered an indicator species for the health of shola forests.

It is occasionally grazed on by Nilgiri tahrs, though it is not known if this grazing extends to the fruit or only the leaves and shoots.

== Conservation ==
Syzygium calophyllifolium is considered endangered by the IUCN. The main threat it faces is habitat degradation after large parts of its habitat were converted into plantations, wattle trees were introduced, and infrastructure developed nearby.

In 2026, S. calophyllifolium plants in the Western Catchments failed to flower or produce fruit. Due to a lack of data on the plant's usual patterns, it is unclear what caused this. Suggestions include that it may have been caused by a natural resting period of the plant, though staff in the area reported the plant usually flowers every year; by climate change; or by El Niño.

The population size is less than 700 mature individuals and declining, with any given subpopulation containing a maximum of 100 mature individuals. It is currently known to appear in 13 locations and 5 landscapes, with 72% of the population being in Nilgiri and Agasthyamala biosphere reserves.

There are no specific conservation plans in place for S. calophyllifolium. However, protections are in place for the shola forest in the Nilgiri biosphere reserve and 4 of the 13 locations it appears in are protected areas.

== Medicinal uses ==
Extract of S. calophyllifolium's seeds and bark may have some effect as an antidiabetic, though some studies suggest this effect may need to be further verified. The fruit has significant antioxidant and antibacterial properties.

Traditionally, the leaves of S. calophyllifolium have been used to treat skin conditions while the fruit and bark have been used to treat toothache and inflammation.

Fruit of S. calophyllifolium
