= Mukurthi =

Mountain in Tamil Nadu, India

Coordinates: 11.3715°N 76.5177°E

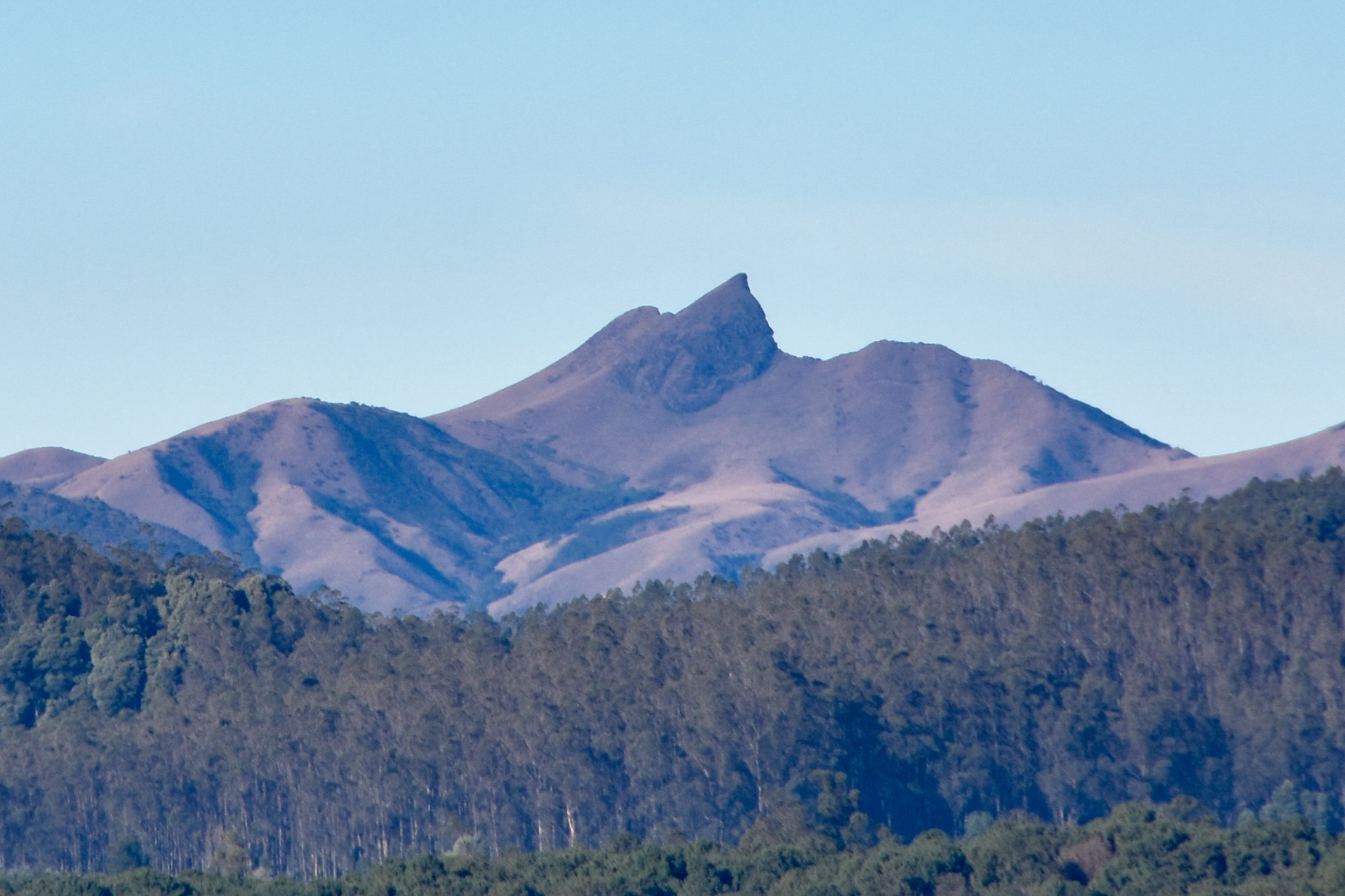
Mukurthi peak

Mukurthi Peak is one of the highest peaks in the Western Ghats, situated on the border of Udagamandalam taluk, Nilgiris, Tamil Nadu, Nilambur taluk, Malappuram, and Kerala in India. It reaches an altitude of 2,554 m (8,379ft), and is the fifth-highest peak in South India.

== Geography ==
The western slope of the hill sits astride the Kerala/Tamil Nadu border. It has many cliffs ranging from 500 m to 2,500 m. Part of Mukurthi is situated within Malappuram district, which is the third-highest point in Kerala, after Anaimudi (2,696 m) and Meeshapulimala (2,651 m). The peak can only be accessed through Nilgiri district. The Mukurthi peak is said to resemble a "pointed nose."

Mukurthi peak is part of Mukurthi National Park (Nilgiri Tahr National Park), in the Nilgiri Biosphere Reserve. Mukurthi is covered with shola (patches of stunted tropical montane forest (found in valleys amid rolling grassland in the higher montane regions of South India), including pine, grasslands and shrublands. Its habitat is favorable for Asian elephants, tigers, and Nilgiri Tahr. Mukurthi National Park is situated between the Mudumalai National Park and the Silent Valley National Park. Ooty is the nearest town (30 km away).

Pichalbetta (2,544 m) and Nilgiri hill are the most prominent peaks adjacent to this area, and Mukurthi Dam is also nearby.

== Surroundings ==
Many streams drain into Bhavani River. Among the peaks inside the National Park, the highest are Kolaribetta (2,630m), together with Mukurthi Peak (2,556m) and Nilgiri Peak (2,477m. Southwest of Mukurthi lies Silent Valley National Park, and to its west the land falls steeply to 2,000 m in the Amarabalam Forest.

The area under monoculture forestry in Mukurthi is comparatively less than Nilgiris district, and consists mainly of Acacia mearnsii, Eucalyptus globulus and Pinus patula. The vegetation is either Southern Montane Wet Temperate Forest (shola), grassland and plantation. Pristine shola patches can be seen throughout the park, generally at the heads of streams in the folds of converging slopes. These forests support a variety of flora and fauna. This IBA site is among the richest regions of plant biodiversity, with many endemic orchids and other plant groups. Grasslands in Mukurthi are common and form a mosaic with shola. They are a mixture of Chrysopogon, Ischaemum, Dicanthium, Andropogon, Eragrostis and Panicum species. The ecological status of these grasslands is debated.

== Wildlife ==
Mukurthi hosts many species of wildlife:

- Nilgiris tahr
- Sambar deer
- Barking deer
- Nilgiris marten
- Otter
- Jungle Cat
- Jackal
- Laughing thrushes
- Whistling thrushes
- Woodcock
- Wood pigeon
- Black eagle
- Blue Admiral
- Indian Red Admiral
- Indian Cabbage white
