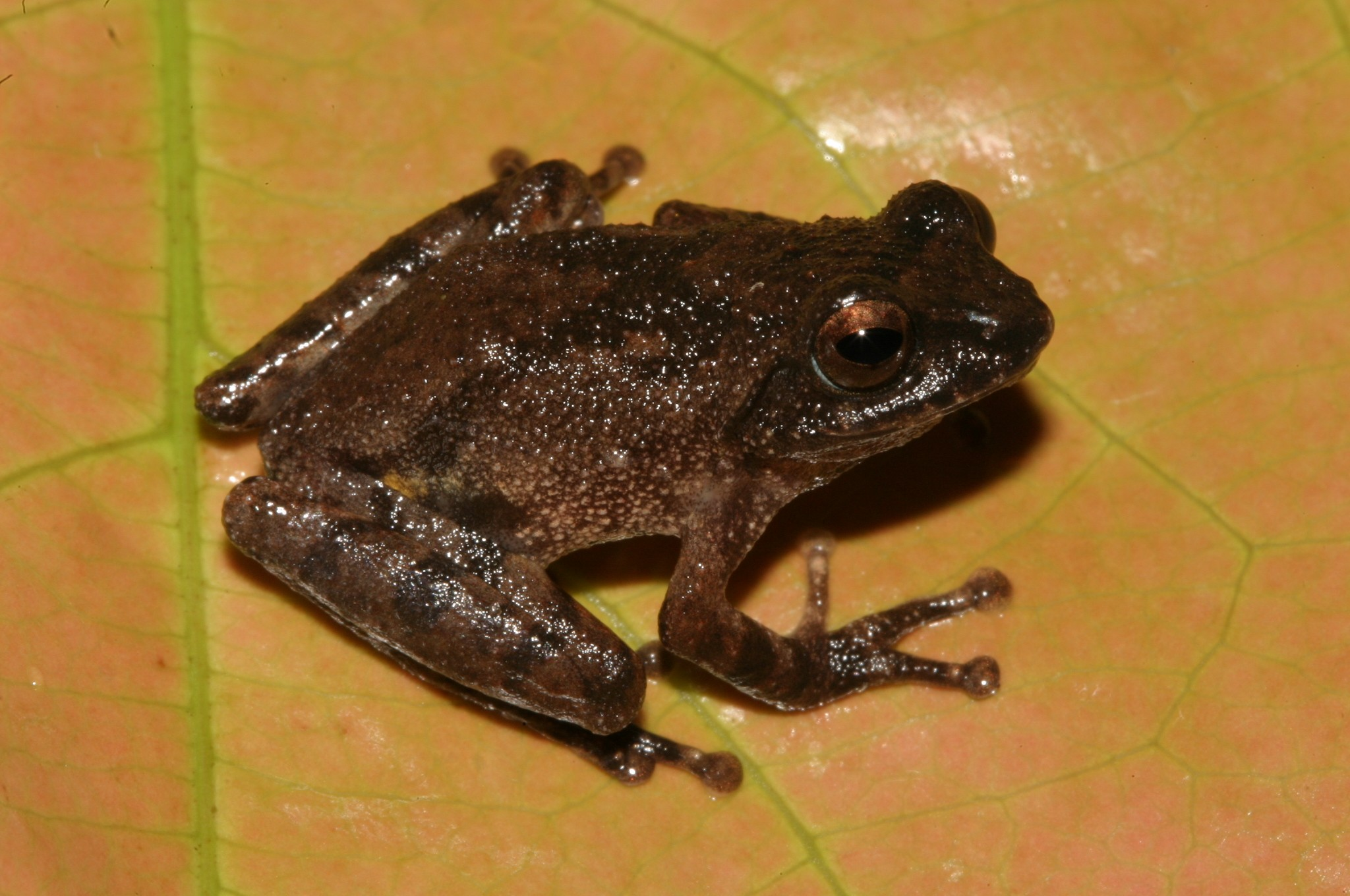

Conservation status
- Data Deficient (IUCN 3.1)

Scientific classification
- Kingdom: Animalia
- Phylum: Chordata
- Class: Amphibia
- Order: Anura
- Family: Rhacophoridae
- Genus: Raorchestes
- Species: R. ravii

Binomial name
- Raorchestes ravii Zachariah et al., 2011

= Raorchestes ravii =

Species of amphibian

Raorchestes ravii is a species of frogs of the genus Raorchestes found in Naduvattam in the district of Nilgiris in Tamil Nadu, India, about 1890 meters above sea level. The species is named after Ravi Chandran, an enthusiast from Wayanad who discovered the species.

The first scientists to describe this frog observed it on a tea farm. Since then, people have seen this frog between 1890 and 2,284 meters above sea level in grassland and shola forest. Scientists infer this frog probably breeds through direct development, like other frogs in Raorchestes do.

There have been reports of this frog in other places, such as Mukurthi National Park.

== Original description ==
- Zachariah A; Dinesh KP; Kunhikrishnan E; Das S; Raju DV; Radhakrishnan C; Palot MJ; Kalesh S (2011). "Nine new species of frogs of the genus Raorchestes (Amphibia: Anura: Rhacophoridae) from southern Western Ghats, India". Biosystematica (Excerpt). 5 (1): 25–48.
