= Western Catchments =

Coordinates: 11°24′15″N 76°41′41″E

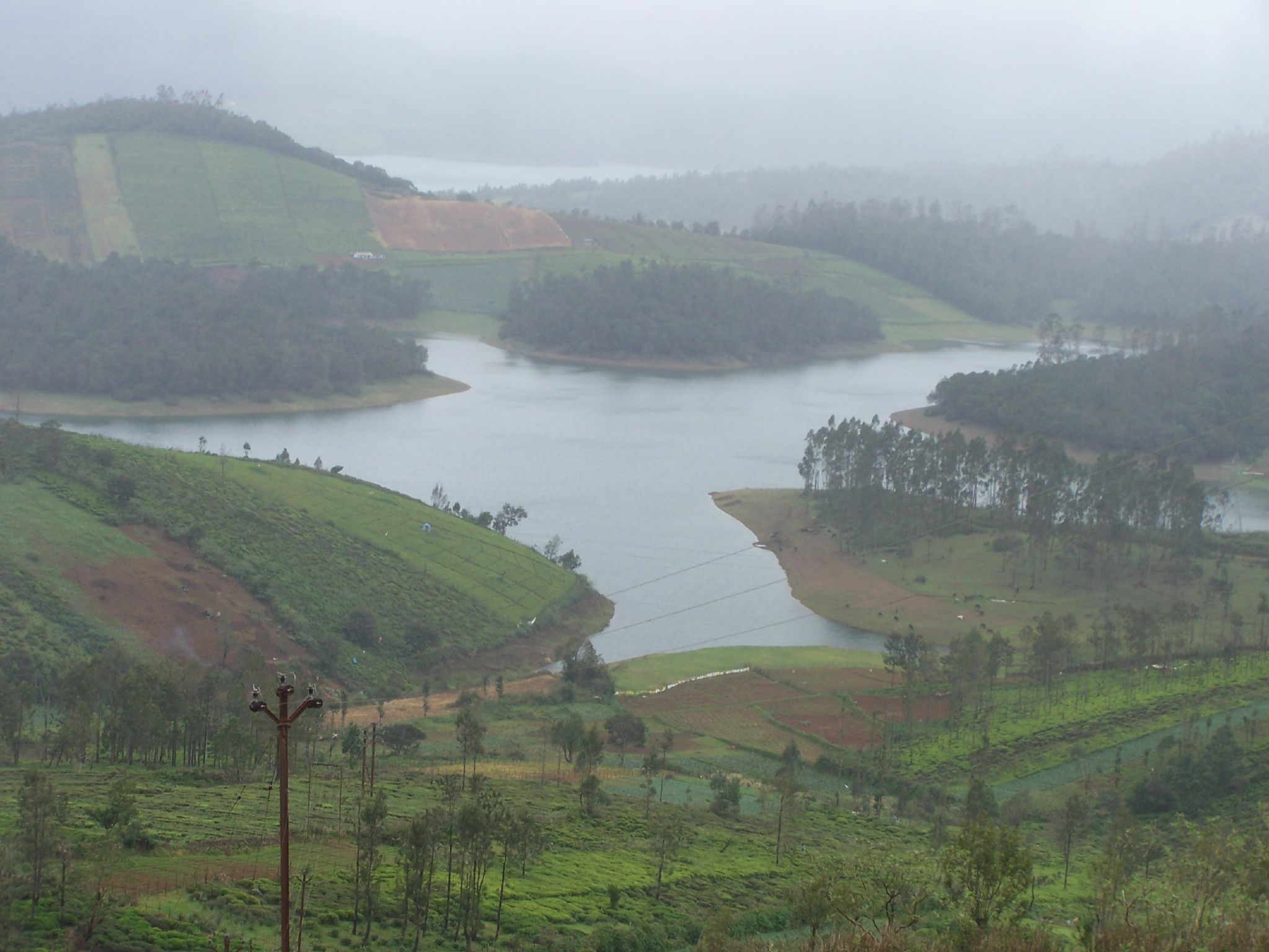
view of Avalanche lake from Western Catchments

Western Catchment is an area of The Nilgiris, Tamil Nadu, situated about 20 km from Ooty. The Western Catchment area is protected by the Forest Department, and tourists are not allowed in without permission. Earlier some regional movies were filmed here, but due to environmental protection permission is no longer given.

== About the area ==
The area is covered by grassland, and the lower points of the valleys are filled with by shola.

Its streams and reservoirs include Portimund Lake, just outside Western Catchment.

Animals like Nilgiri tahrs, sambars, and mongoose live in Western Catchment.

== See also ==
- Western Ghats
- Tropical rainforests of India
