= Sispara =

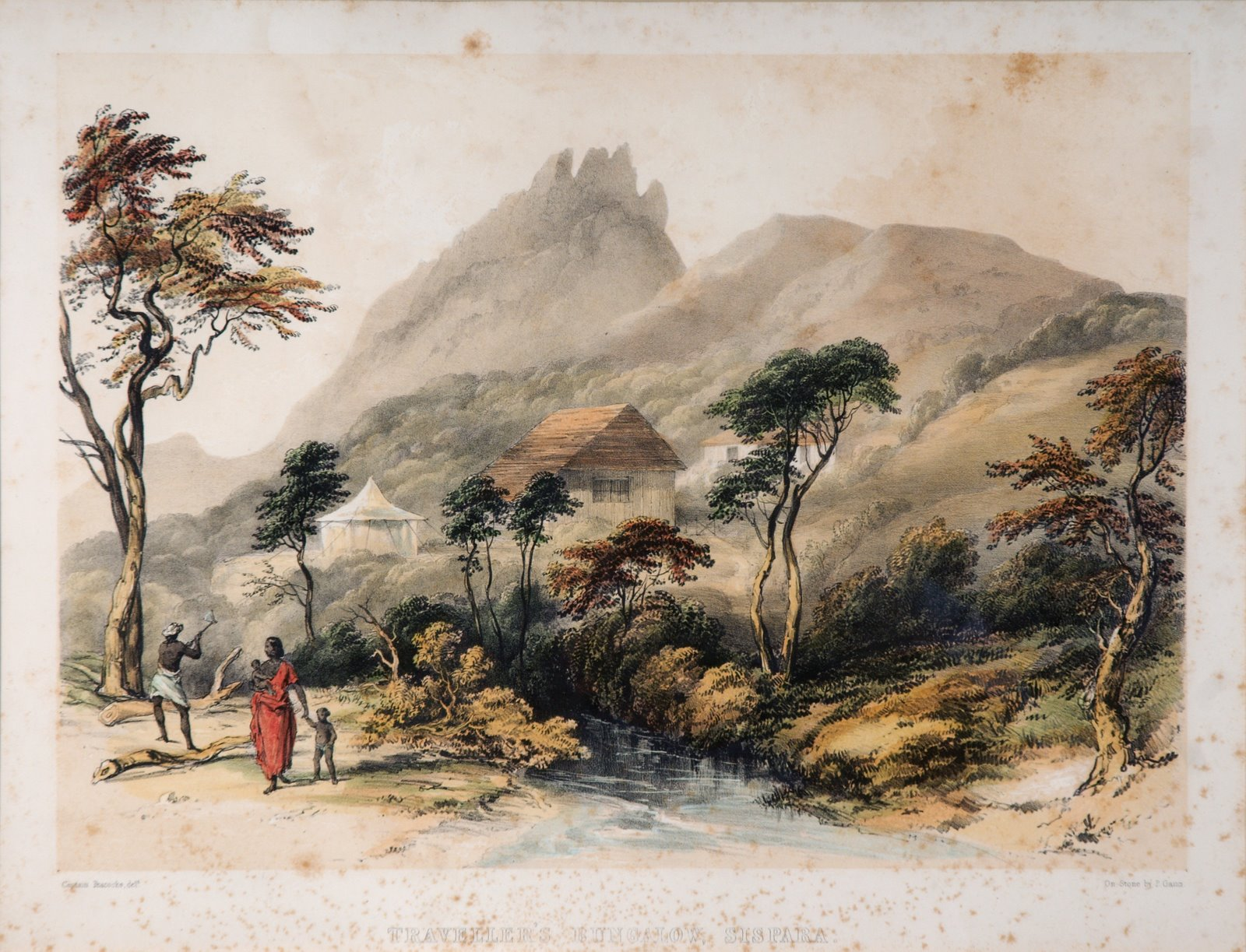
View to the west, of Sispara bungalow and Sispara peak across the stream in Sispara pass from the Sispara ghat trail. Lithograph after Stephen Ponsonby Peacocke <1847

Sispara, സിസ്പാര (Sisapara, Sisparra, Sisparah, Su:spore), a proper noun, is a combination of the Badaga language words si:su + pore; meaning: magnetite bearing rock + gorge. It may refer to:

- Sispara peak, a large hill in Kerala;
- Sispara bungalow, the shelter at the base of the peak;
- Sispara pass, the low gap between hills where the shelter is located; or
- Sispara ghat, the mountain trail that goes through the pass.

== Sispara peak ==
Sispara Peak in Kerala

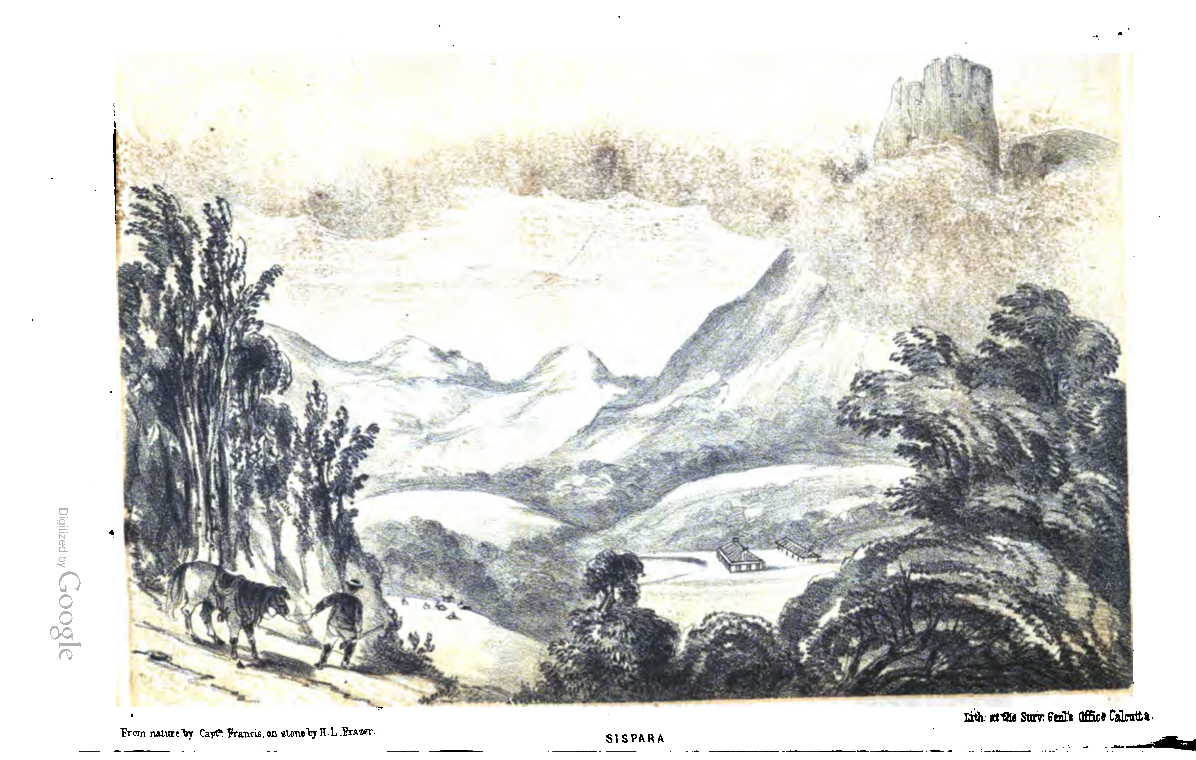
Sispara peak with bungalow and trail, <1857

Sispara peak (സിസ്പാര മല), elevation 2,206 metres (7,238 ft) at 11°12′12″N 76°25′56″E, is in the northeast end of Silent Valley National Park, Palakkad district of the Kerala state, in the core area of the Nilgiri Biosphere Reserve, in the Western Ghats of South India. It is near the southwest end of Mukurthi National Park in Tamil Nadu state.

One can approach this peak by passing northwest up behind the bungalow, and ascending the high bluff below the peak. Half an hour's walk leads to a vertical precipice of the escarpment facing the plains of Malabar. Numerous lofty trees growing at the foot of the precipice reach the brim of this point. A walk along the edge of this escarpment brings one to a huge peaking mass of rock, a few hundred yards from the foot of the highest Sispara summit, which stands like a battlement on a wall. In 1886, Henry Francis Blanford, geologist of the Geological Survey of India, described the view from this peak:

The view from this point is really magnificent, particularly that of the gigantic amphitheatre to the right, the termination of the Koondahs on this side. It is very striking to look at this stupendous semicircular recess, formed by enormously lofty mountains, the summits of which rise vertically to thousands of feet, and whose abrupt sides are deeply corroded by ravines and chasms, down which small but romantic cascades precipitate themselves, adding to the magnificence of this stupendous scenery.

Sispara peak is the abode of the Toda tribes people ancestral spirits. It is the second highest peak in the core area of Silent Valley, Anginda peak at 2,383 metres (7,818 ft), being the highest. The forests near Sisapara are exposed to the full force of the southwest monsoon and receive up to 250 inches (640 cm) per year of rain, but suffer from a long drought during the winter.

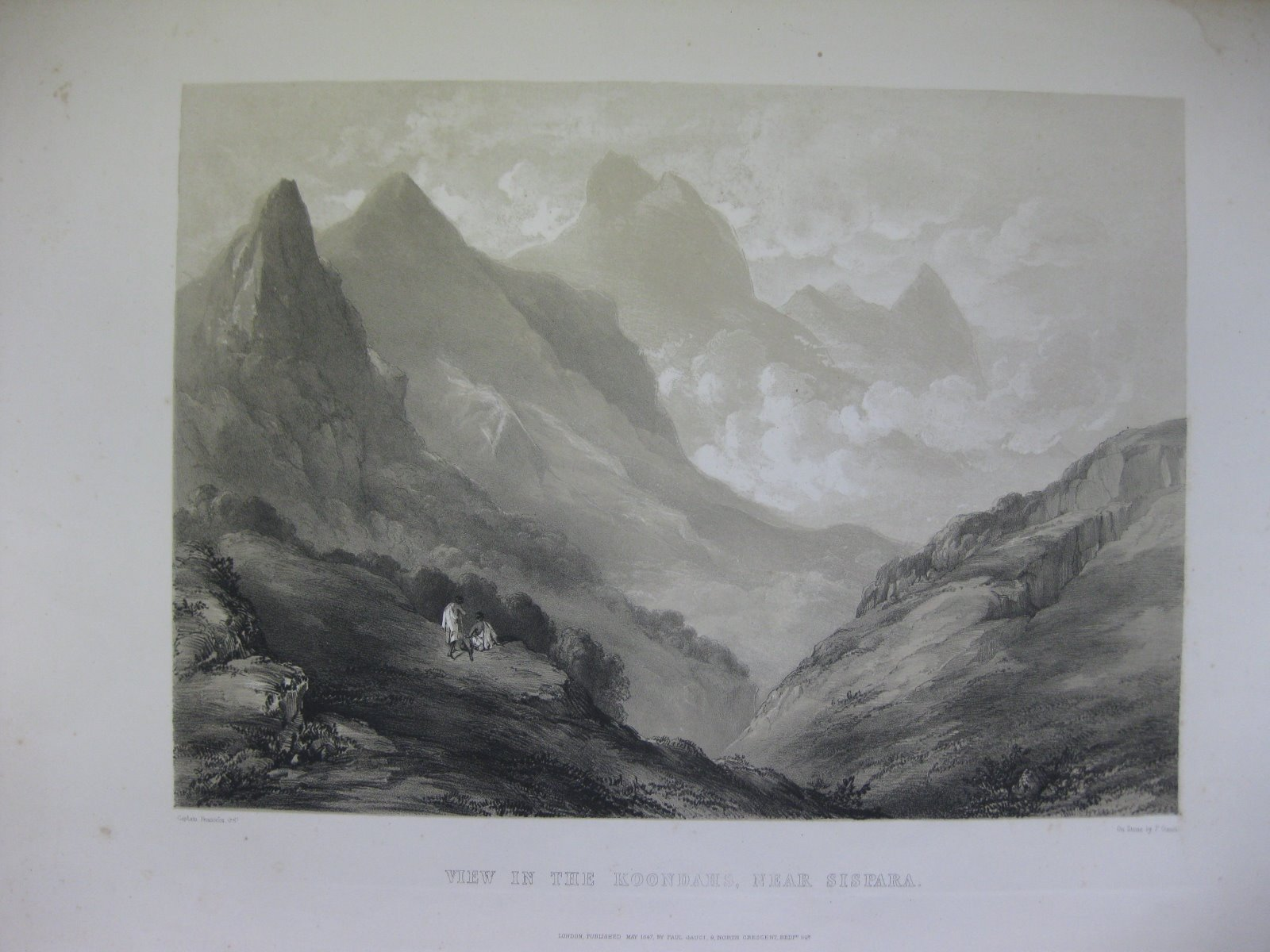
View in the Koondahs, near Sispara peak

Extending northeast from Sispara peak over 20 miles (32 km) in a magnificent amphitheatre of precipices and steep hills in the Nilambur South Forest Division to Mukurthi peak (2,554 m (8,379 ft), 11°23′29″N 76°31′38″E) is the great western escarpment of the Kundah Range.

Henry Blanford described this area well:

There is perhaps no scene in Southern India more grand and imposing than this gigantic escarpment. Rising abruptly from the low jungle covered plains of Malabar, to the lofty surface of the Koondah plateau, an elevation of nearly 8,000 feet (2,400 m), a precipitous hill face covered with dense jungle, furrowed but not broken up by innumerable hill torrents which course down its surface, and glisten like silver threads amid the dark green foliage of the forest. It would seem at first sight perfectly inaccessible from the plains below, and such it is throughout the greater portion of its extent.

It is only at Sispara that, with considerable engineering skill, a road has been constructed, forming a communication between the hills and the low country of Malabar, and it is from this road that the finest view of the escarpment is obtainable.

== Sispara bungalow ==
Sispara Trekking Shed, 2008

Sispara bungalow is at the eastern base of Sispara peak, just north of the trail at 11°12′07″N 76°26′21″E, elevation: 2,300 metres (7,500 ft). When the Sispara road from Ootacamund to the foot of the hills below was being made in 1832, it was the camp of the Pioneers Army Regiment who made the road. It was first named Murraypet, after Captain W. Murray who was in charge of the detachment. A travellers bungalow was built there just below a strikingly sheer cliff of rock. Later a chattram (refreshment shed) was built beside that. While the trail was still in use, this place was a well known and much frequented halting-point on what was then the main route from Kozhikode to Ootacamnud.

About 1840, a coloured lithograph of a painting by Captain Stephen Ponsonby Peacocke shows that there was a small tiled bungalow, with a thatched outbuilding and a large tent at this place. It also shows the small seasonal stream between the trail and the bungalow. A later lithograph of the place, which forms the frontispiece to the second edition of Baikie's Neilgherries, shows that by 1857, a tiled bungalow and a smaller shed stood there. After 1857, the bungalow at Sispara was accidentally burnt down and was never rebuilt. By 1908 it was deserted and overgrown.

A gruesome story is told of a poorly informed traveller who attempted to get to Ootacamund from the west coast by this route. One of his two servants quickly succumbed to exposure from the cold and driving rain of the monsoon. He set out up the ghat with the other, who collapsed soon afterward. The traveller took him on his back and struggled up the trail, buoyed with the hope of assistance and food when he reached the Sispara bungalow at the top. When he did finally arrive there, the only sign of the bungalow was its crumbling ruins, and the nearest human being was at Avalanche, 18 miles (29 km) further on! He managed to reach that place, still carrying his servant, but the latter had died on the way.

In 2007, a roughly 12 square metres (130 sq ft) new steel trekkers' shed was built on the old site. This shed is protected by an elephant-proof trench, and trekkers may use it with permission of the Wildlife Warden, Silent Valley National Park.

== Sispara pass ==
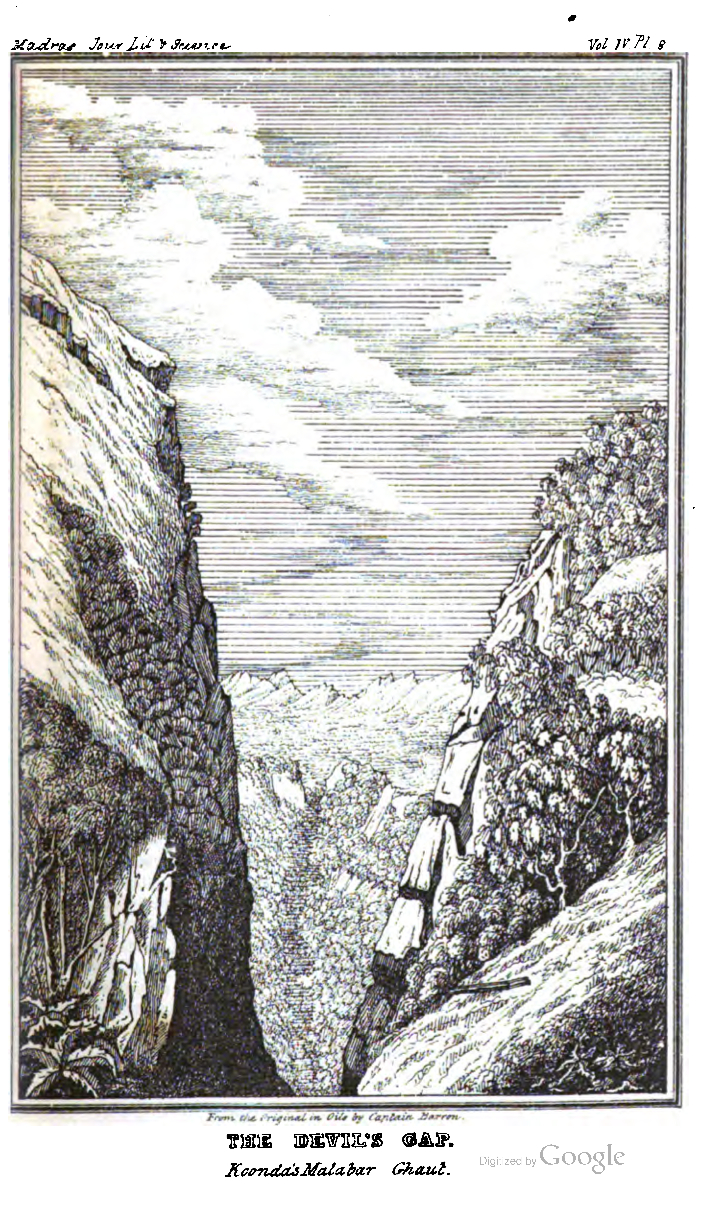
Sispara Ghat trail: The Devils Gap, 1836

Sispara pass, formerly known as Koondah (Kundah) pass, is a mountain pass between Sispara peak and Anginda peak. This is the lowest and most accessible passage through the steep western escarpment of the Kundah range of the Nilgiri hills. Sispara pass is at the head of a long and deep ravine, enclosed between two almost perpendicular ridges. The Ghat trail is built along the side of the northwest ridge.

In the 19th century, this pass provided the shortest route for postal delivery between Ootacamund in the hills and Kozhikode on the west coast and was used for smuggling of cannabis, tobacco and later salt.

The Devil's Gap is an extraordinary chasm situated at the top of the escarpment, four miles (6 km) north of the steepest part of Sispara pass. The lower part of this chasm is nearly level with the road which passes close to it. The rocks forming its walls are about 100 yards (91 m) apart in the center and near the opening it is about 150 yards (140 m) wide.

== Sispara ghat ==
The Sispara ghat mountain road ran west-north-west 13 miles (21 km) from Ootacamand to Avalanche; then 9 miles (14 km) up the Kundahs to Bangitappal; another 9 miles (14 km) to Sispara in the extreme south-western Corner of the plateau; and then 11.5 kilometres (7.1 mi) more down a steep descent to Walaghat (halfway down the slope) and Sholakal at the bottom. From Sholakal to Arriakul on the Baypoor river was 25.5 miles (41.0 km) and thence 35 miles (56 km) by large boat to Kozhikode port on the Indian Ocean. Overall travelling distance between Kozhikode and Ootacamund by Sispara was 103 miles (166 km).

The first written report of the use of this route up into the Nilgiri hills was by an expedition of the Goa Inquisition led by the Jesuit priest Jacome Ferreira, from the Syrian Christian Church of the Malabar coast at Calicut. Ferreira's formal report, written upon his return on 1 April 1603, contained some account of the Badagas and Todas. It states that he and his party returned by a better route than they arrived. The route was shown to them by the kindly Badagas, of which no account is given but which may have been the Sispara path.

In November 1831, development of the Sispara ghat, formerly known as the Koondah (Kundah) ghat, was suggested by Mr. Stephen Rumbold Lushington, then Governor of Madras, to provide a speedy route to Ootacamund from Calicut for invalids travelling by ship from Bombay.

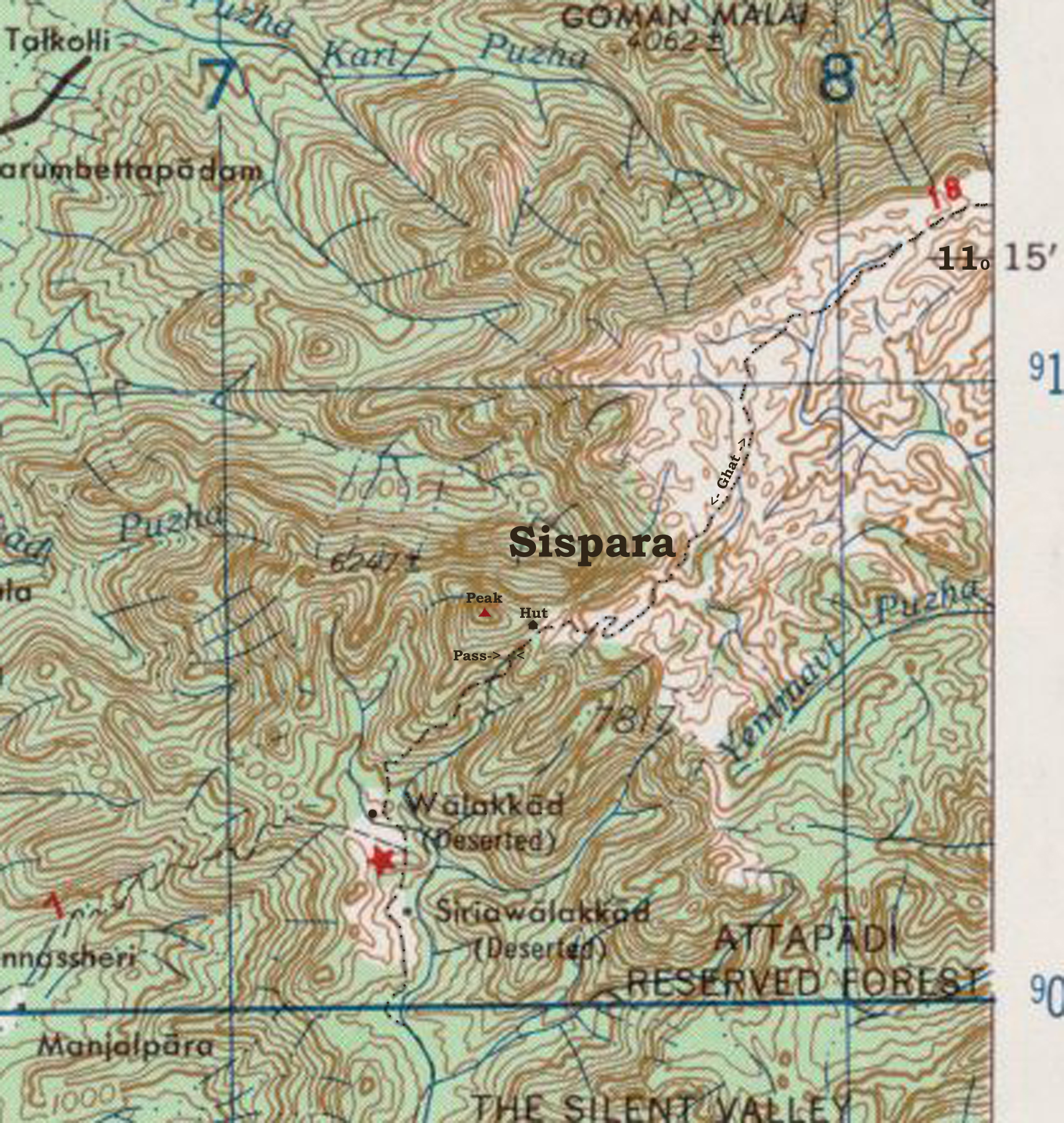
Sispara map showing: peak, hut, pass and ghat in 1959

It became practicable for lightly laden carts as far as Avalanche by an improved road and was a maintained bridle-path as far as Sispara. Up to Sispara, it was much used by shooting-parties and two private shooting huts were not far south of it at Pirmand and Bison Swamp. However, the steep path below Sispara, overgrown with dense jungle, was passable only on foot.

In 1831, Major Crewe, Commandant of the Nilgiris, Lieutenant LeHardy, surveyor of the Coonoor ghat then under construction, and Captain Murray of the Pioneer Regiment, searched the western side of the plateau for a practicable route for a new road and at length heard of the Sispara path, which, though greatly overgrown, was then one of the obscure paths used by tobacco-smugglers.

Lieutenant LeHardy surveyed the best route for the trail afterwards called the Sispara ghat. Captain Murray and his Pioneers were entrusted with the construction of the road. Between 10 January and 31 May 1832, they established camps at Avalanche and Sispara and worked to clear and level the road with the aid of coolies and 'tank-diggers'.

On 31 May, Capt. Murray reported that the Kundah pass, as it was then called, was open with a path down the slopes connecting with the roads on the Malabar plains. Sispara was known for some time as Murraypet. The route was so infested with elephants and tigers that the Collector of Malabar obtained sanction to purchase five large swivel mounted muskets (jingalls) and employ ten peons (foot soldiers) to shoot the beasts and protect the coolies. The track was very rough but the monsoon set in and later the Pioneers were diverted to widening the Coonoor ghat. Work was not resumed till 1836.

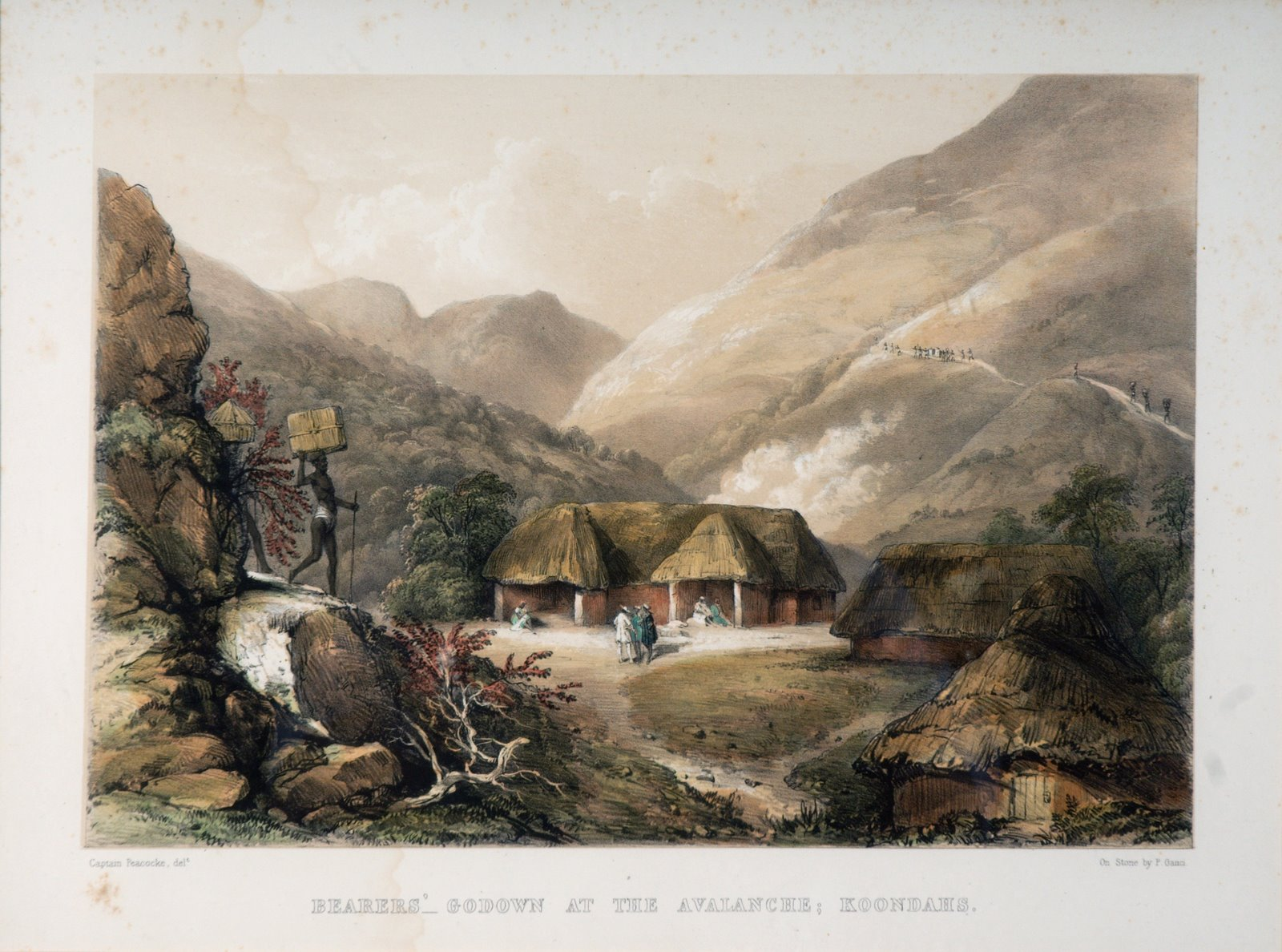
Bearers' go down at the Avalanche, showing palanquin on ghat trail towards Sispara, <1847

In 1836 the track was so narrow that two people could not ride abreast along it. The principal obstacle was the 'ladder hill' near the middle of the descent, which was surmounted by steep zigzags at very acute angles. The Pioneers were camped at Walaghat, halfway down, in huts scattered through the jungle, the site being too steep and confined for any regular cantonment. The road was finished in 1838, with a gradient of one in nine. Bungalows for travellers were built at Sholakul, Walaghat, Sispara and Avalanche. The extraordinarily heavy rainfall at that end of the Kundahs necessitated large annual repairs in subsequent years. The trail was so steep that it was seldom used for laden cattle, and the climate was so severe and the shelter en route so insufficient that Europeans often could not get coolies to come with them to carry their baggage. The ghat thus failed to fulfill its high expectations. As early as 1841 it was declared to be 'rarely traversed except at the height of the dry season', and it was eventually abandoned. After 1857, the bungalow at Sispara was accidentally burnt down and was never rebuilt.

The following account of the ascent of Sispara Ghat by Clements Robert Markham defies editing.

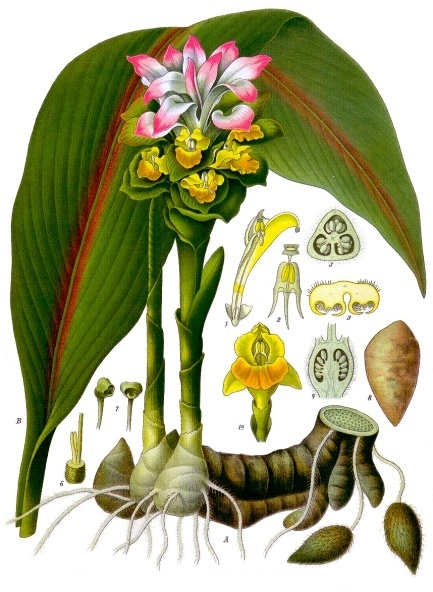
Curcuma sp.

We landed at the port of Calicut, on our way to the Nilgiri Hills, on the 7th October 1860. He who would desire to receive the most pleasant impression of India, on a first arrival, must follow in the wake of Vasco da Gama, and disembark on the coast of Malabar, the garden of the peninsula. Here Nature is clad in her brightest and most inviting robes, the scenery is magnificent, the fields and gardens speak of plenty, and the dwellings of the people are substantial and comfortable.

Late in the evening, we embarked in a canoe on the Beypur river. The banks are wooded down to the water's edge, with groves of slender betel palms rising above the other foliage, and standing out against the starry sky. We were met by Mr. Mclvor at the landing-place of Eddiwana, and started at once for the village of Wundur, whence the road leads up the Sisapara ghat to the Nilgiris.

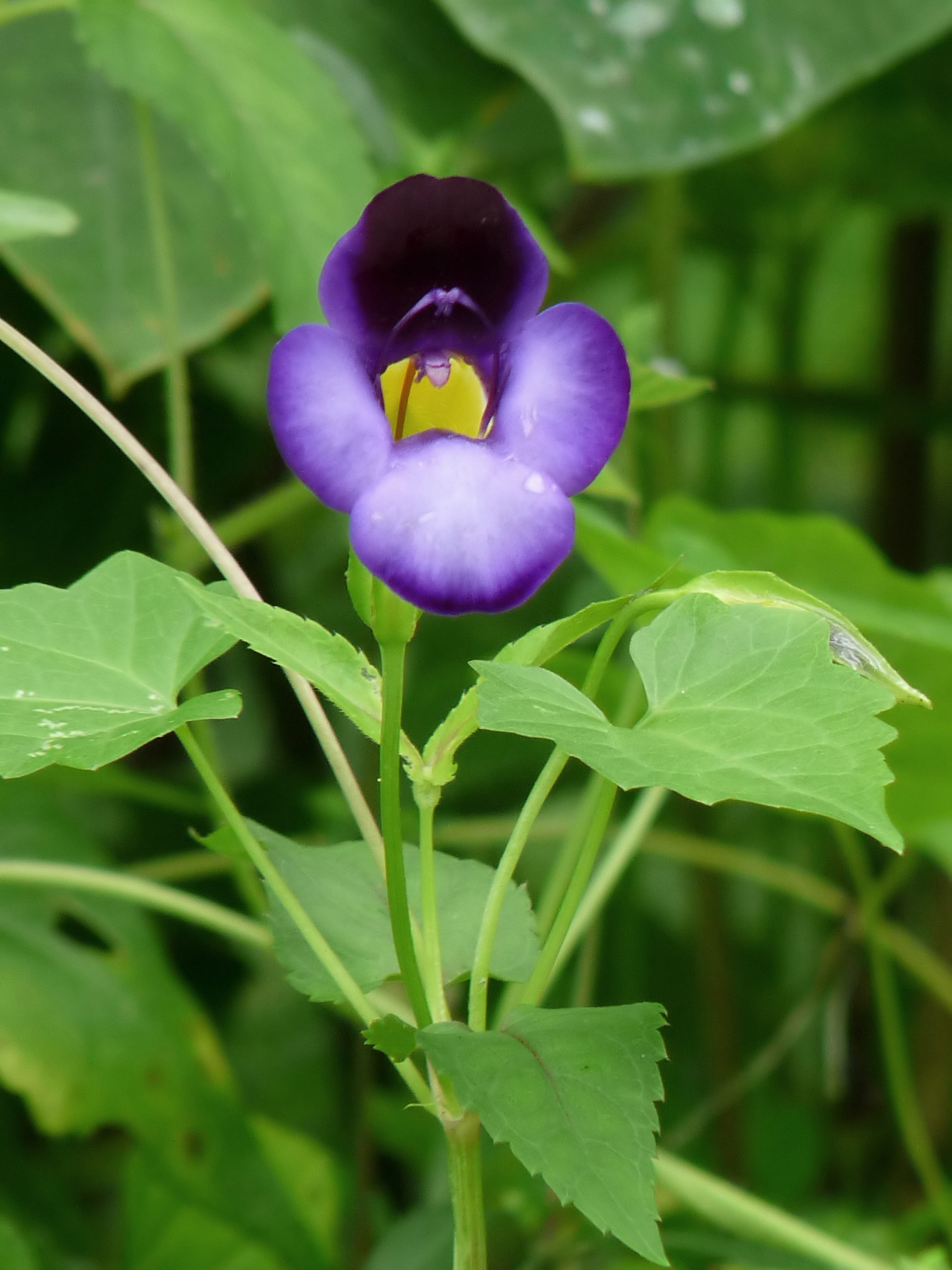
Wishbone Flowers, Torenia Asiatica

The ascent commences at Sholakul, a post-house surrounded by stout palisades, to protect it from wild elephants. Thence the road first passes through a tract overgrown with gigantic weeds, and then up a steep slope, covered with a forest of blackwood and other fine timber trees, with an undergrowth of ferns, Curcumas, and a brilliant little purple flower, the Wishbone Flower, Torenia Asiatica (Torenia glabra). The occasional openings in the forest, at turns in the road, afforded us views of the mountains below us, covered with the richest vegetation, and of the rice-fields of Malabar, stretching away to the faintly indicated blending of sea and haze on the far horizon. As we continued the ascent the scenery increased in magnificence, the views became more extensive, and there were mountain-tops crowned with grand forest trees far below us. At 6000 feet mosses appear, then lilies, brambles, and wild strawberries, and occasionally we crossed noisy little streams overshadowed by the trees.

We reached the Sisapara bungalow, on the summit of the ghat 6742 feet above the level of the sea, late in the afternoon. The Sisapara ghat takes the traveller from the tropical plains to the temperate climate of the hills, where the face of Nature is entirely changed. Here the slopes are covered with grass, and the ravines only are filled with trees, forming thickets called sholas. In the rear of the Sisapara bungalow, there is an almost unrivalled view of the Malabar plains, from the edge of a precipice. The Kundah hills sweep round until they join the Wyanad range, and appeared to be so steep that even a cat could not scale them for many miles; and far below were the forests, with occasional open glades. The distance from Sisapara to Utakamand, the chief English station on the Nilgiris, is thirty-three miles, fifteen of which are over the Kundah hills, and the rest of the distance is within the Nilgiris proper.

== Flora and fauna ==
From Sispara peak there is a panoramic view of deep valleys packed with dense vegetation. The Sispara pass leading down into Silent Valley, is enveloped in foliage and remains hidden even from the top of the peak.

Robert Wight, a surgeon turned botanist, ventured into this area in the middle of the 19th century. In the process, Wight discovered seven new species from Sispara and the adjoining jungles and as many as 122 Indian plants have been named after him.

The Sispara Day Gecko is found here. The Gecko Cyrtodactylus nebulosus was abundant near the foot of the Sispara slopes.

The endangered plants Glochidion sisparense, Ilex gardneriana, Melicope indica, Memecylon sisparense, Pavetta hohenackeri, Peliosanthes neilgherrensis, Pogostemon paludosus, Pygeum sisparense, Symplocos pulchra and Youngia nilgiriensis are endemic to the Sispara area. The now endangered Impatiens denisonii was once very abundant along the Sispara Ghat on rocks and trees of the western slopes of the Nilgiris at elevations of 900 metres (3,000 ft) to 1,500 metres (4,900 ft).

== Literature ==
- Baber, Thomas Hervey, (1830) Journal of a route to the Neelghurries from Calicut, Asiatic Journal (New Series), III, 310–316.
