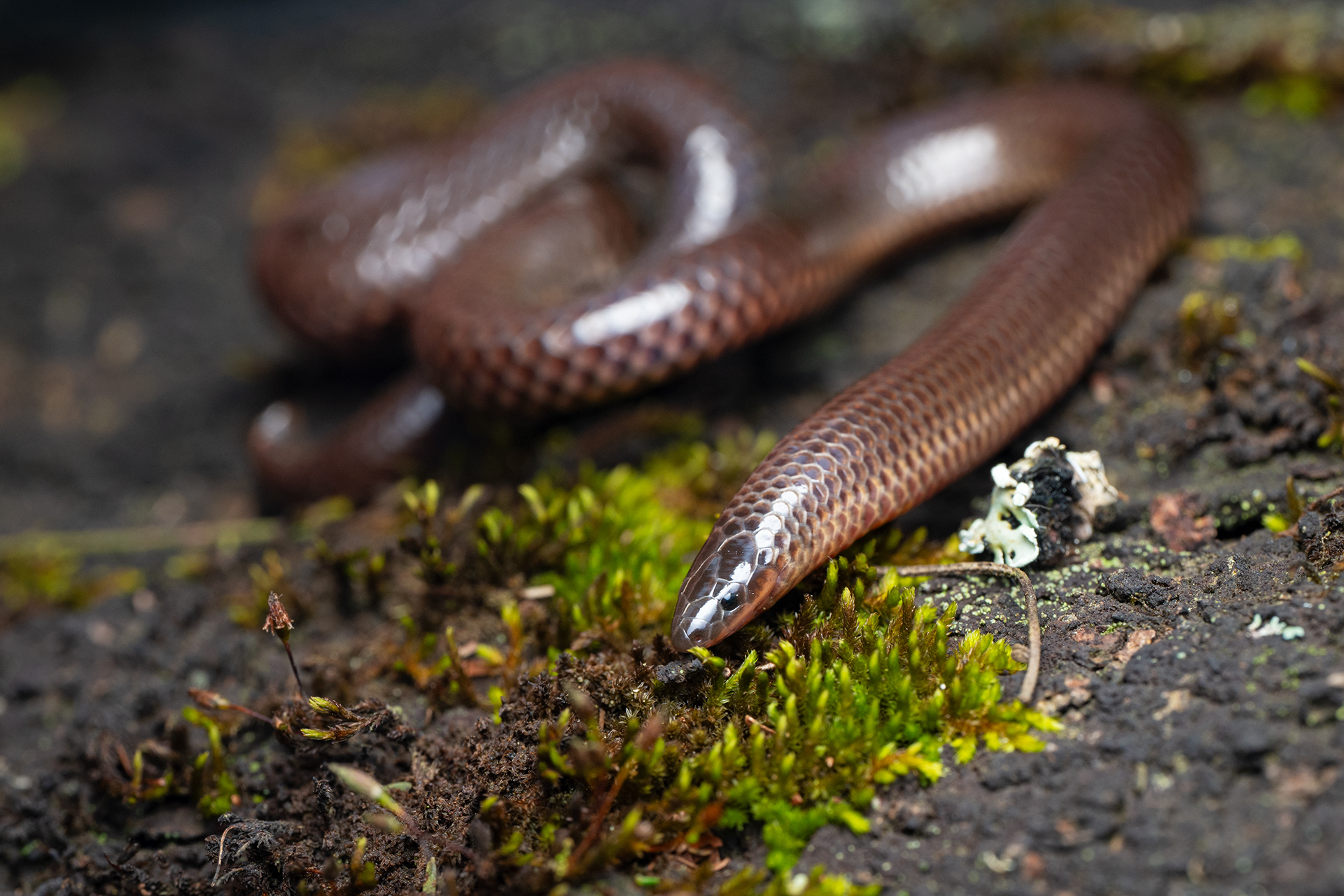
- Nilgiri burrowing snake or Perrotet's shield-tail snake

Conservation status
- Least Concern (IUCN 3.1)

Scientific classification
- Kingdom: Animalia
- Phylum: Chordata
- Class: Reptilia
- Order: Squamata
- Suborder: Serpentes
- Family: Uropeltidae
- Genus: Plectrurus
- Species: P. perroteti

Binomial name
- Plectrurus perroteti A.M.C. Duméril, Bibron & A.H.A. Duméril, 1854

Synonyms
- Plecturus perrotetii A.M.C. Duméril, Bibron & A.H.A. Duméril, 1854; Plectrurus davidsoni Beddome, 1886

= Plectrurus perrotetii =

Plectrurus perotteti

Species of snake

Plectrurus perroteti, commonly known as the Nilgiri burrowing snake or Perrotet's shield-tail snake, is a species of harmless snake in the family Uropeltidae. The species is endemic to India.

== Etymology ==
The specific name, perroteti, is in honour of French naturalist George Samuel Perrottet (1793–1867).

== Geographic range ==
Plecturus perroteti is found in the Western Ghats and hills of southern India.

== Habitat ==
The preferred natural habitat of Plectrurus perroteti is grassland at elevations of 1,300–2,600 m (4,300–8,500 ft), but it has also been found in artificial habitats such as plantations.

== Description ==
Plecturus perroteti is a small snake, growing to a maximum total length (tail included) of 44 cm (17 1/4 in). The head is pointed, and the tail is blunt. P. perroteti has smooth, glossy scales and is brown in colour.

Like the common worm snake (Ramphotyphlops braminus), Plectrurus perroteti is also often mistaken for an earthworm.

== Behavior ==
Plectrurus perroteti is terrestrial and fossorial.

== Diet ==
Plectrurus perroteti preys upon earthworms.

== Reproduction ==
The mode of reproduction of Plectrurus perroteti has been described as viviparous and as ovoviviparous. Gravid females have been encountered in June, July, and August.
