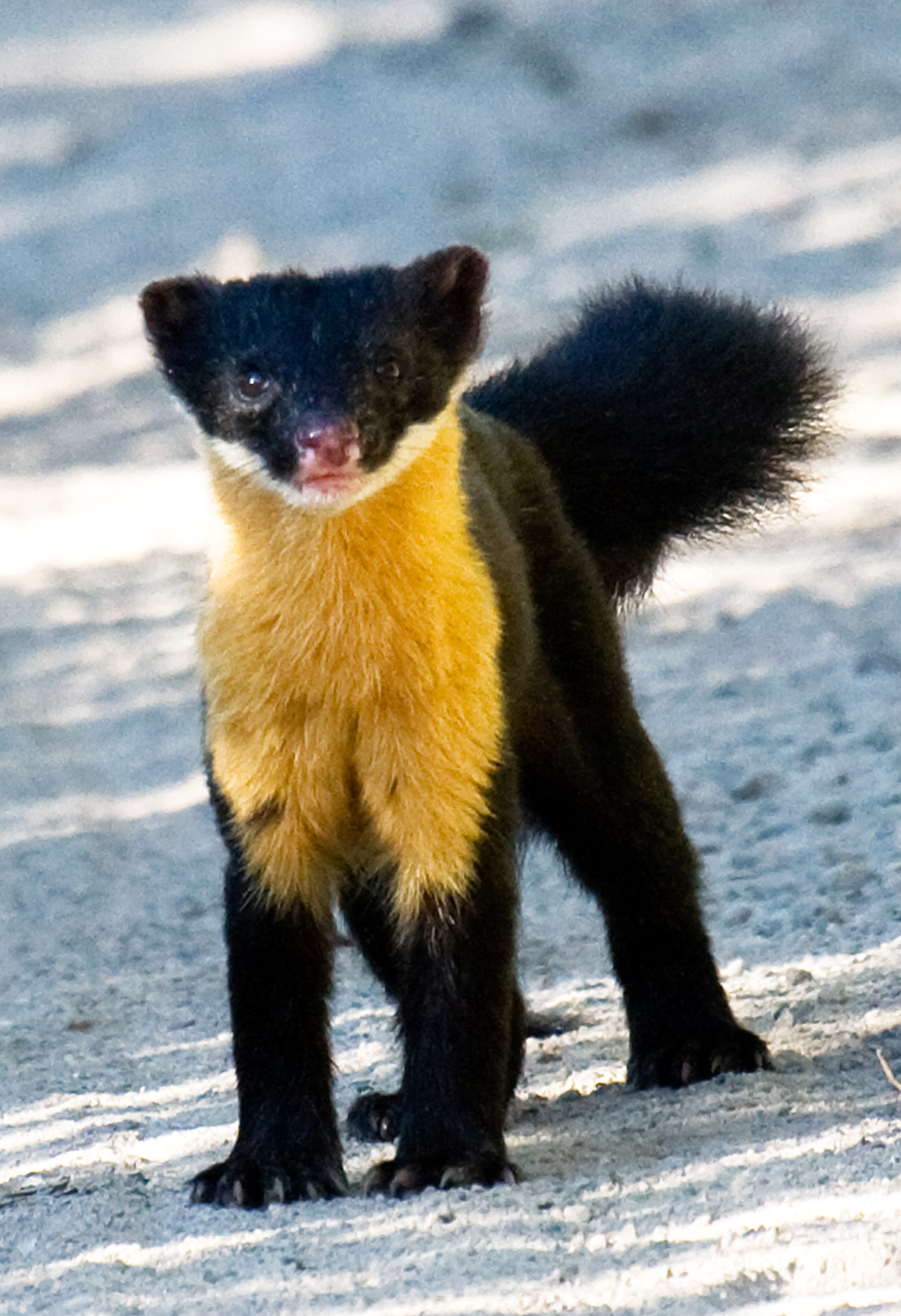

Conservation status
- Vulnerable (IUCN 3.1)
- CITES Appendix III

Scientific classification
- Kingdom: Animalia
- Phylum: Chordata
- Class: Mammalia
- Order: Carnivora
- Family: Mustelidae
- Genus: Martes
- Species: M. gwatkinsii

Binomial name
- Martes gwatkinsii (Horsfield, 1851)
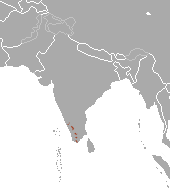
- Nilgiri marten range

Synonyms
- Charronia gwatkinsii

= Nilgiri marten =

Species of carnivoran

The Nilgiri marten (Martes gwatkinsii) is the only marten species native to southern India. It lives in the hills of the Nilgiris and parts of the Western Ghats. With only around a thousand members left it is listed as vulnerable on the IUCN Red List.

== Taxonomy ==
The Nilgiri marten was described by Thomas Horsfield based on a skin in the museum of the East India Company; it is named after the collector Reynolds Gwatkins.

== Characteristics ==
The Nilgiri marten is deep brown from head to rump, with the forequarters being almost reddish, with a bright throat ranging in colour from yellow to orange. It has a prominent frontal concavity and is larger than the yellow-throated marten. It is about 55–65 cm (22–26 in) long from head to vent and has a tail of 40–45 cm (16–18 in). It weighs about 2.1 kg (4.6 lb).

== Distribution and habitat ==
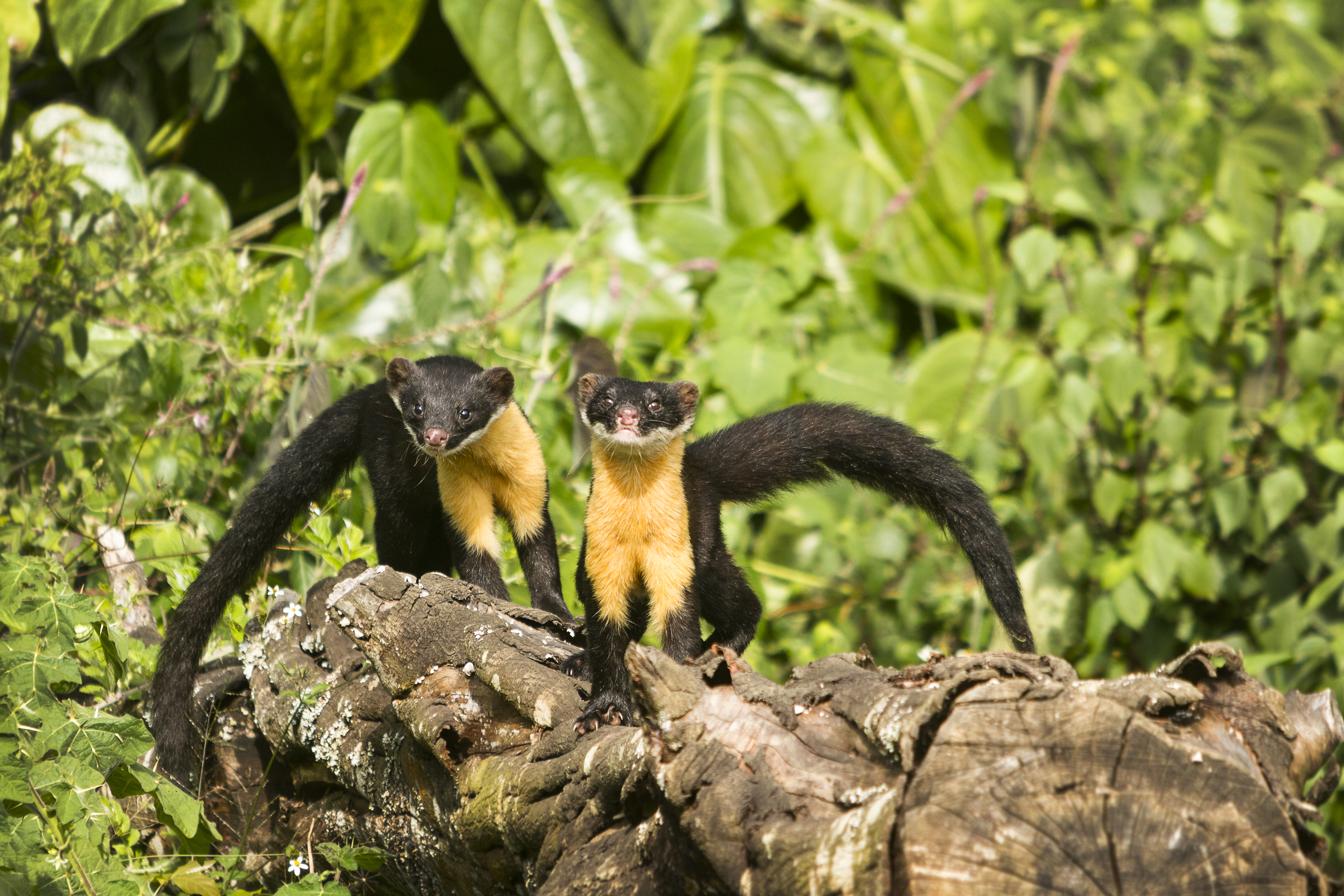
Two Nilgiri martens in Pampadum Shola National Park

The Nilgiri marten mainly inhabits the shola grasslands and South Western Ghats montane rain forests, and occasionally the adjacent South Western Ghats moist deciduous forests and commercial plantations, that span the Western Ghats in the South Indian states of Karnataka, Kerala and Tamil Nadu. The Nilgiri Hills form the center of its range, but sightings have also been reported in Charmadi Ghat and in the Neyyar and Peppara Wildlife Sanctuaries.

== Behaviour and ecology ==
The Nilgiri marten is diurnal. It is mainly arboreal, but descends to the ground occasionally. It is omnivorous and preys on birds, small mammals (including the Malabar giant squirrel) and insects such as cicadas. It has also been observed feeding on a variety of fruits and seeds.
