= Cinnamon liqueur =

Cinnamon liqueur may refer to one of several brands of alcoholic beverages.

== Products ==
Cinnamon flavored liqueurs include Fireball Cinnamon Whisky, Red Stag Spiced by Jim Beam, DeKuyper's Hot Damn!, Sinfire, Gold Strike and Tennessee Fire by Jack Daniels. Some brands, like Goldschlager and cinnamon Schnapps contain snippets of gold leaf.

Other alcoholic beverages that contain cinnamon include infused vodkas, such as Smirnoff's Cinna-Sugar Twist. In November 2013, Beam's Pinnacle Vodka and Cinnabon teamed up to introduce their own brand of cinnamon flavored vodka, Cinnabon Vodka. (Note: It "offers lip-smacking indulgence that combines the decadent flavors of cinnamon, brown sugar and rich cream cheese frosting with hints of caramel to create a taste reminiscent of warm, freshly baked cinnamon rolls. At 70-proof, the product is smooth, five-times distilled and can be served chilled, on the rocks or mixed in festive cocktails at any brunch or get-together." "Pinnacle Vodka and Cinnabon join forces to develop an industry-first vodka innovation" (Press release). Deerfield, IL. November 21, 2013. Archived from the original on 19 December 2013.) Yet another is Stolichnaya Zinamom Vodka.

A "sprinkle" of cinnamon and real cream is combined with Virgin Islands rum in Chila 'Orchata Cinnamon Cream Rum.

The first cinnamon flavored Tequila is Peligroso Cinnamon Tequila — made from 100% Blue Agave — launched in March, 2013. However, a cinnamon cream tequila liqueur expression called Hot Rose — made by McCormick Distilling Company of Missouri with a unique plastic package (Note: "As for the flavor: I work with words a lot, but I don't have the verbiage necessary to convey just how bad a beverage this is. . . ." Norton, James (October 28, 2011). "Lube or Liqueur? I Couldn't Tell". chow.com.) — antedates Peligroso. A follower is Jose Cuervo's Cinge. (Note: "If you're in the market for boozy Red Hots, Jose Cuervo's Cinge should do the trick. Clocking in at 35 percent alcohol by volume, this syrupy hooch has about as much in common with tequila as Fireball does with whiskey." Morgan, Tara (January 15, 2014). "Flavored Tequilas: Only for the adventurous (or young)". Boise Weekly. Archived from the original on February 21, 2014.)

Rakomelo, that is Cinnamon and honey brandy concoctions, called "Cinnamon liqueur" and made with Rakı or Tsipouro, are popular in parts of Greece.

Products that feature cinnamon-infused vodka, include Smirnoff's Cinna-Sugar Twist. In November 2013, Beam's Pinnacle Vodka and Cinnabon created a joint venture to introduce their own brand of cinnamon flavored vodka, Cinnabon Vodka. (Note: It "offers lip-smacking indulgence that combines the decadent flavors of cinnamon, brown sugar and rich cream cheese frosting with hints of caramel to create a taste reminiscent of warm, freshly baked cinnamon rolls. At 70-proof, the product is smooth, five-times distilled and can be served chilled, on the rocks or mixed in festive cocktails at any brunch or get-together." "Pinnacle Vodka and Cinnabon join forces to develop an industry-first vodka innovation" (Press release). Deerfield, IL. November 21, 2013. Archived from the original on 19 December 2013.) Yet another is Stolichnaya Zinamom Vodka.

== Recipes for substitutes ==
For those who desire to make their own "cinnamon liqueur" there is much controversy concerning the proper ingredients. Particularly, some purported "cinnamon" (that found in "cinnamon sticks") isn't in fact cinnamon; as the latter may be banned or limited in some countries due to the presence of coumarin. (Note: Coumarin is currently listed by the Food and Drug Administration (FDA) of the United States among "Substances Generally Prohibited From Direct Addition or Use as Human Food", according to 21 CFR 189.130 Food and Drug Administration but some natural additives containing coumarin, such as the flavorant sweet woodruff are allowed "in alcoholic beverages only" (21 CFR 172.510). In Europe, popular examples of such beverages are Maiwein (white wine with woodruff) and Żubrówka (vodka flavoured with bison grass). In the late 1970s, the latter drink disappeared from shelves in the United States, and it was thereafter renamed and reformulated for U.S. distribution. In addition to the Coumarin problem, American authorities determined that the trademark on Żubrówka brand was diluted and unenforceable, as it was a generic name, like "Aspirin". Michaels, Daniel (18 January 2011). "Name Your Poison: How a Banned Polish Vodka Buffaloed Its Way Into the U.S." The Wall Street Journal.)
