= Fireball Cinnamon Whisky =

Cinnamon-flavoured whisky-based liqueur

- A bottle and a glass of Fireball Cinnamon Whiskey Tastes Like Heaven, Burns Like Hell
- Type: Canadian whisky-based cinnamon liqueur
- Manufacturer: Sazerac Company
- Origin: Canada
- Introduced: 1984
- Alcohol by volume: 33% by vol (66 proof)
- Flavor: Cinnamon
- Ingredients: Canadian whisky Cinnamon; Sweeteners
- Website: fireballwhisky.com

Fireball Cinnamon Whisky is a liqueur produced by the Sazerac Company. It is a mixture of a Canadian whisky base with cinnamon flavoring and sweeteners, and is bottled at 33% alcohol by volume (66 U.S. proof).

The product was developed in Canada by Seagram in the mid-1980s as a flavour of Dr. McGillicuddy's. Fireball is primarily sold in the United States and Canada, but has expanded internationally starting in 2014. As of 2018, it is among the top selling whisky-related brands in the US.

== History ==
Fireball was originally part of a line of flavored schnapps developed by Seagram in the mid-1980s. The manufacturer's story line is, in part, that it was the product of a Canadian bartender's efforts to warm up from an Arctic blast. The Sazerac Company purchased the brand rights and formula from Seagram in 1989. It was marketed as "Dr. McGillicuddy's Fireball Whisky". Later, in 2007, the product was rebranded as "Fireball Cinnamon Whisky".

An April 2014 article in Bloomberg Business Week said "It's also one of the most successful liquor brands in decades. In 2011, Fireball accounted for a mere $1.9 million in sales in U.S. gas stations, convenience stores, and supermarkets, according to IRI, a Chicago-based market research firm. In 2013, sales leapt to $61 million, passing Jameson Irish whiskey and Patrón tequila."

In 2012 and 2013, the product had a surge in popularity, which the company achieved by using social media, cultivating bartenders, word of mouth, and a relatively small advertising budget. It is said that the sharp increase in sales early in its resurgence (late 2011/early 2012) can be attributed to a grass roots effort by Beer Can Alley, a Des Moines, Iowa Country bar. Several national country music acts performed at the establishment during this time and inspired multiple references in many popular songs

In 2013, it became one of the top ten most popular liquors, displacing Jose Cuervo tequila. In 2016, Bloomberg reported that with estimated sales of at least $150 million in 2015, the brand had overtaken Jägermeister in popularity to become the top-selling liqueur in the United States.

The brand's label was designed by Ross Sutherland, who's also designed labels for Black Magic rum, Wheatley Vodka, and some other brands.

In 2023, the brand debuted its first barrel-aged whiskey, called Dragon Reserve, releasing 618 bottles as a promotion for Father's Day.

== Serving ==
Fireball is usually consumed as a "straight shot" or on the rocks. The Sazerac website says "the cinnamon flavor is often used for shooters but can add character to a mixed drink."

There are, however, various cocktails that use Fireball as an ingredient, and the company has encouraged a variety of such cocktails through its official website and social media channels. They include "Cinna-Rita", "Fire Nut Ball", "Hot Cherry Fizz", "Red Apple Spice", and "Ring-of-Fire". Another is a blend of Irish coffee called "Fire Starter Coffee". An "Angry Balls" mixer is a combination of Angry Orchard cider and Fireball.

Other concoctions made with Fireball include:

- The Hotter Toddy (with tea, honey, and lemon)
- Ciderball (with hard cider)
- The Drunken Dessert (with hot chocolate)
- The Ultimate French Toast Shot (with Butterscotch liqueur and Baileys Irish Cream)
- The Cinnamon Toast Crunch (with RumChata)
- The F-Bomb (with Red Bull).
- Dr. Fire (with Dr. Pepper)
- Firestarter (Monster)

The latter energy drink bomb shot may be compared to the Jägerbomb.

== Awards and accolades ==
- Los Angeles International Wine & Spirits Competition: Bronze Medal (2010)
- San Francisco World Spirits Competition: Gold Medal (2010)
- International Review of Spirits: Silver Medal, "Best in Class" (2009)
- International Wine & Spirits Competition: Bronze Medal (2007)

== Health concerns ==
In 2014, Finland and Sweden reported that Fireball contained amounts of propylene glycol that surpassed the EU limitations of 1g/kg. Norway also decided to recall the product. The company responded by saying the product was "perfectly safe to drink" and called it a "small recipe-related compliance issue" related to the difference in regulations between the North American and European markets. The recalled batches were replaced with a compliant product, and sales were allowed to resume for the EU-compliant formulation.

As of 2018, Fireball does not use propylene glycol in any of its products.

== Legal disputes ==
In early 2012, the Sazerac company sued Hood River Distillers over the allegedly confusing trade name and marketing of its product, SinFire Cinnamon Whisky. The case was settled in 2013 and SinFire Cinnamon Whisky continues to exist.

In 2015, the Sazerac company filed a lawsuit complaining that the Jack Daniel's division of Brown-Forman had infringed its Fireball trademark while marketing Tennessee Fire, a cinnamon flavored Tennessee whiskey. The lawsuit was dropped later that year.

In January 2023, the Sazerac company was sued by a consumer for fraud and misrepresentation over their non-whisky "Fireball Cinnamon" products, which are malt-based. These versions of their product do not qualify as spirits and thus can be sold in stores that only allow beer and wine sales. According to the lawsuit, the "Fireball Cinnamon" packaging and appearance are nearly identical to the flagship whisky product in order to confuse consumers. The lawsuit, filed in United States District Court for the Northern District of Illinois, is currently ongoing.
