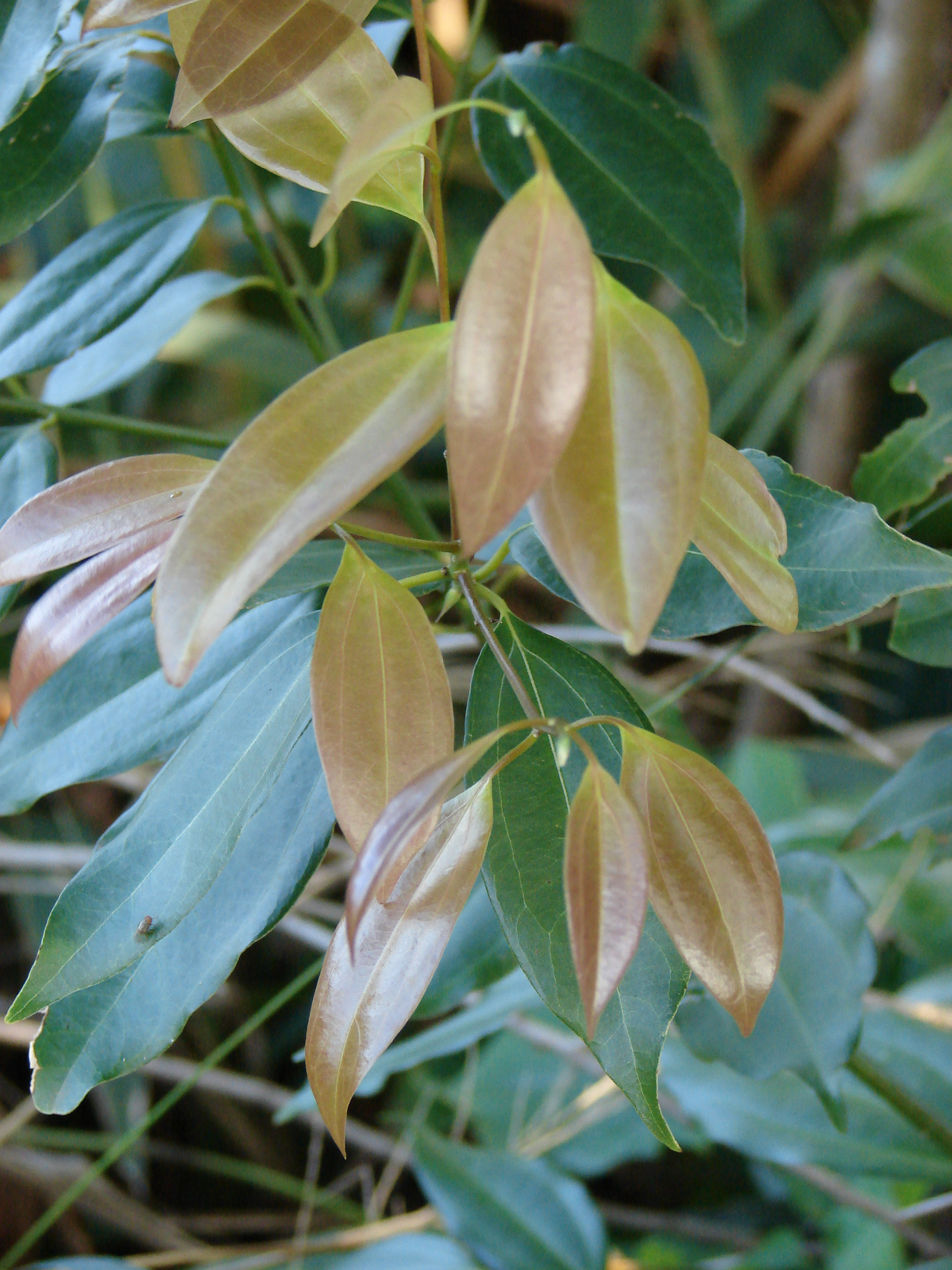

Conservation status
- Least Concern (IUCN 3.1)

Scientific classification
- Kingdom: Plantae
- Clade: Tracheophytes
- Clade: Angiosperms
- Clade: Magnoliids
- Order: Laurales
- Family: Lauraceae
- Genus: Cinnamomum
- Species: C. burmanni

Binomial name
- Cinnamomum burmanni (Nees & T.Nees) Blume

Synonyms
- Synonymy: Cinnamomum ammannii Lukman.; Cinnamomum burmanni var. angustifolium Meisn.; Cinnamomum burmanni var. chinense (Blume) Meisn.; Cinnamomum burmanni var. kiamis (Nees) Meisn.; Cinnamomum cassia Siebold; Cinnamomum chinense Blume; Cinnamomum dulce (Roxb.) Nees; Cinnamomum dulce var. ammannii Lukman.; Cinnamomum dulce var. sieboldii Lukman.; Cinnamomum dulce var. thunbergii Lukman.; Cinnamomum hainanense Nakai; Cinnamomum kiamis Hassk.; Cinnamomum kiamis Nees; Cinnamomum macrostemon Hayata; Cinnamomum miaoshanense S.Lee & F.N.Wei; Cinnamomum mindanaense Elmer; Cinnamomum mutabile Blume ex Miq.; Cinnamomum nitidum (Roxb.) Hook.; Cinnamomum sieboldii Lukman.; Cinnamomum suaveolens Lukman.; Cinnamomum thunbergii Lukman.; Laurus cinnamomoides Nees; Laurus cinnamomum Blanco; Laurus burmanni Nees & T.Nees; Laurus dulcis Roxb.; Laurus nitida Roxb.; Persea dulcis (Roxb.) Spreng.; Persea nitida (Roxb.) Spreng.

= Cinnamomum burmanni =

Indonesian cinnamon

Species of flowering plant

Cinnamomum burmanni (or Cinnamomum burmannii), also known as Indonesian cinnamon, Padang cassia, Batavia cassia, or korintje, is one of several plants in the genus Cinnamomum whose bark is sold as the spice cinnamon. It is an evergreen tree native to Southeast Asia.

== Description ==
Cinnamomum burmanni is an evergreen tree growing up to 7 m (23 ft) in height with aromatic bark and smooth, angular branches. The leaves are glossy green, oval, and about 10 cm (3.9 in) long and 3–4 cm (1.2–1.6 in) wide. Small yellow flowers bloom in early summer, and produce a dark drupe.

== Distribution ==
Cinnamomum burmanni is native to tropical Southeast Asia. It ranges from Bangladesh to Myanmar, southern China, Hainan, Vietnam, Indonesia (Borneo, Sumatra, Java, Sulawesi, the Lesser Sunda Islands), and the Philippines. It has also become invasive in Taiwan since around the 1970s.

In Sumatra C. burmanni is commonly found in West Sumatra and western Jambi province, with the Kerinci region being especially known as the center of production of quality, high essential-oil crops.

On Borneo it occurs in Sabah (Keningau, Lahad Datu, Ranau, Sandakan and Sipitang districts) and Kalimantan, where it found in cultivation and in secondary forest, villages, and abandoned plantations to 1,500 metres elevation.

C. burmanni is an introduced species in parts of the subtropical world, particularly in Hawaiʻi, where it is naturalized and invasive. It was introduced to Hawaiʻi from Asia in 1934 as a crop plant.

== Use ==
Aromatic oil can be extracted from the bark, leaves, and roots of Cinnamomum burmanni. The bark is also used as a cinnamon bark. The leaves can be used as a spice for preserved food and canned meat instead of laurel leaves. The core contains fat, which can be squeezed for industrial use. The wood is used for fine furniture and other fine work materials. C. burmanni is also a Chinese herbal medicine.

The most common and cheapest type of cinnamon in the US is made from powdered C. burmanni. C. burmanni oil contains no eugenol, but higher amounts of coumarin than C. cassia and Ceylon cinnamon with 2.1 g/kg in an authenticated sample, and a mean of 5.0 g/kg in 8 samples tested. It is also sold as quills of one layer.

== Ecology ==
The plant's young foilage serves as a larval food source for the cinnamon butterfly.

== Gallery ==
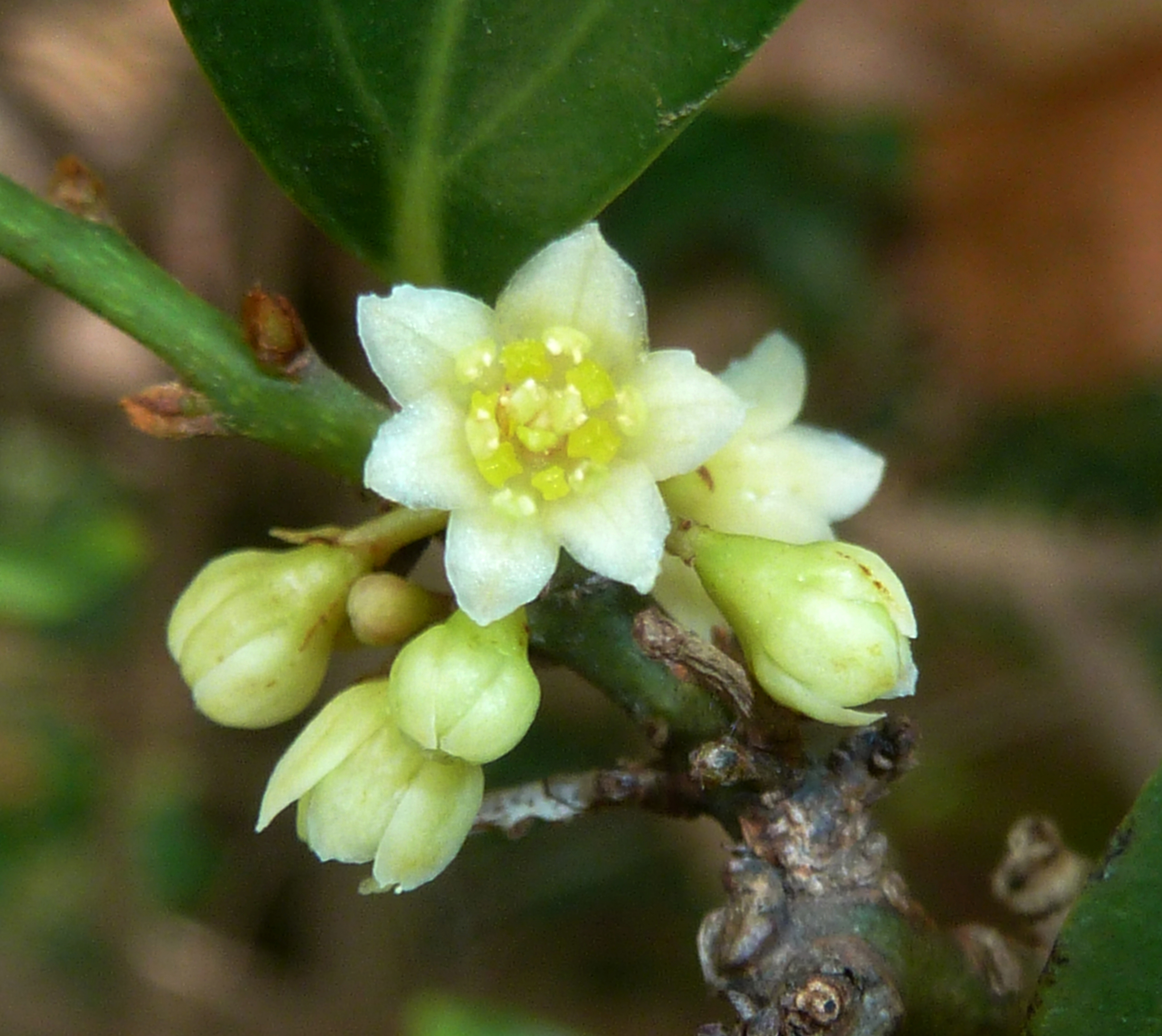
Flower. The flower has six to eight petals.

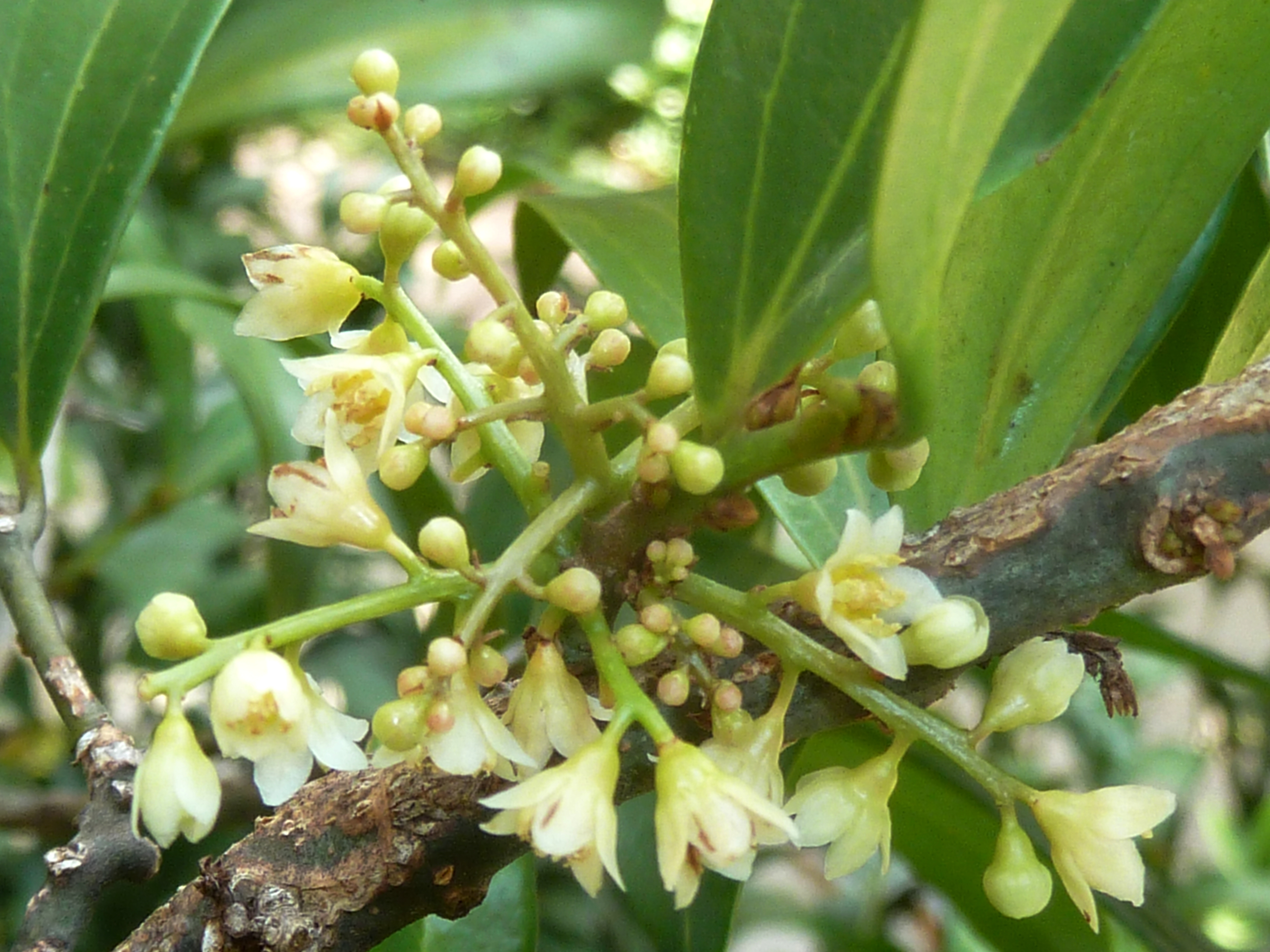
flower sprays

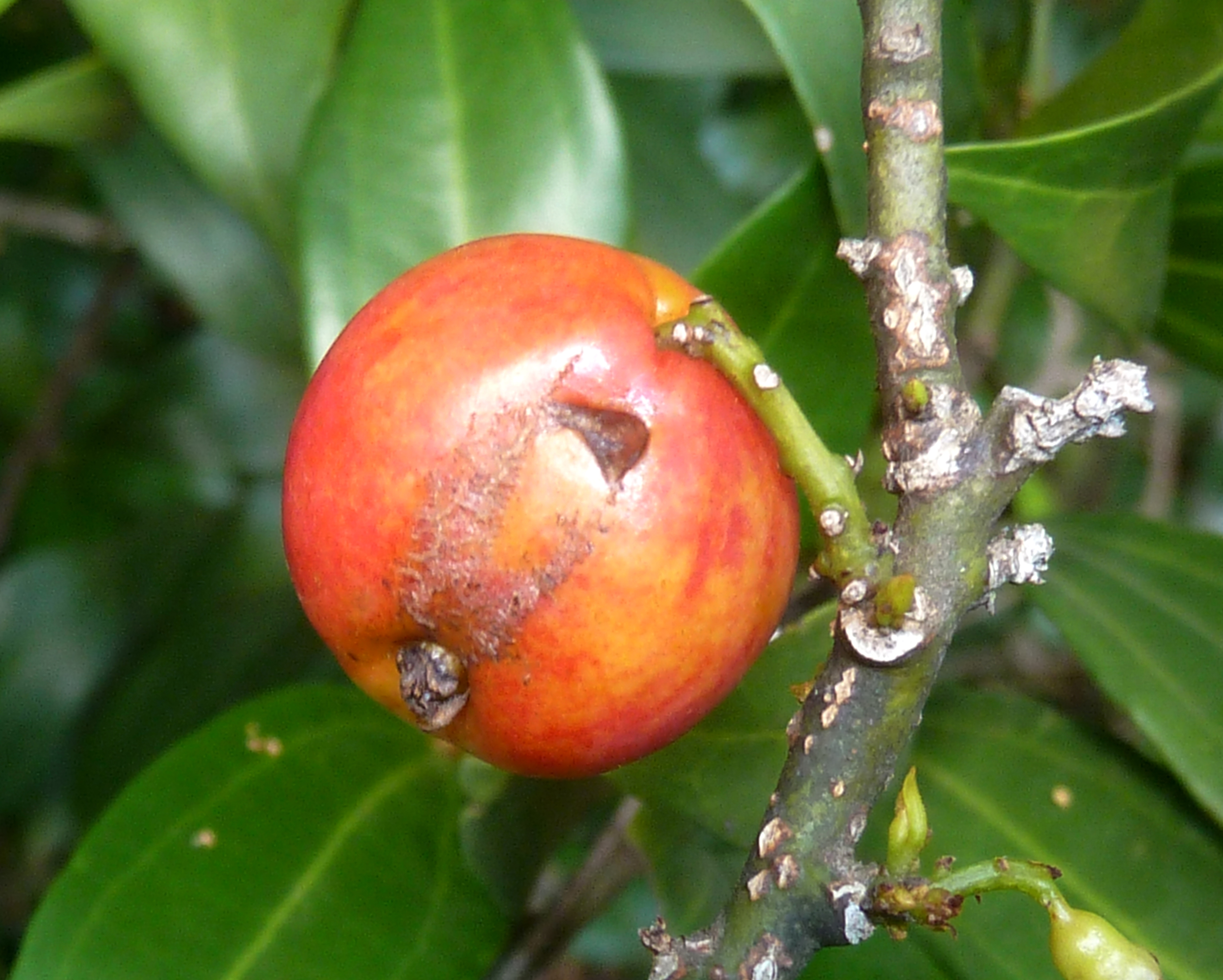
gall

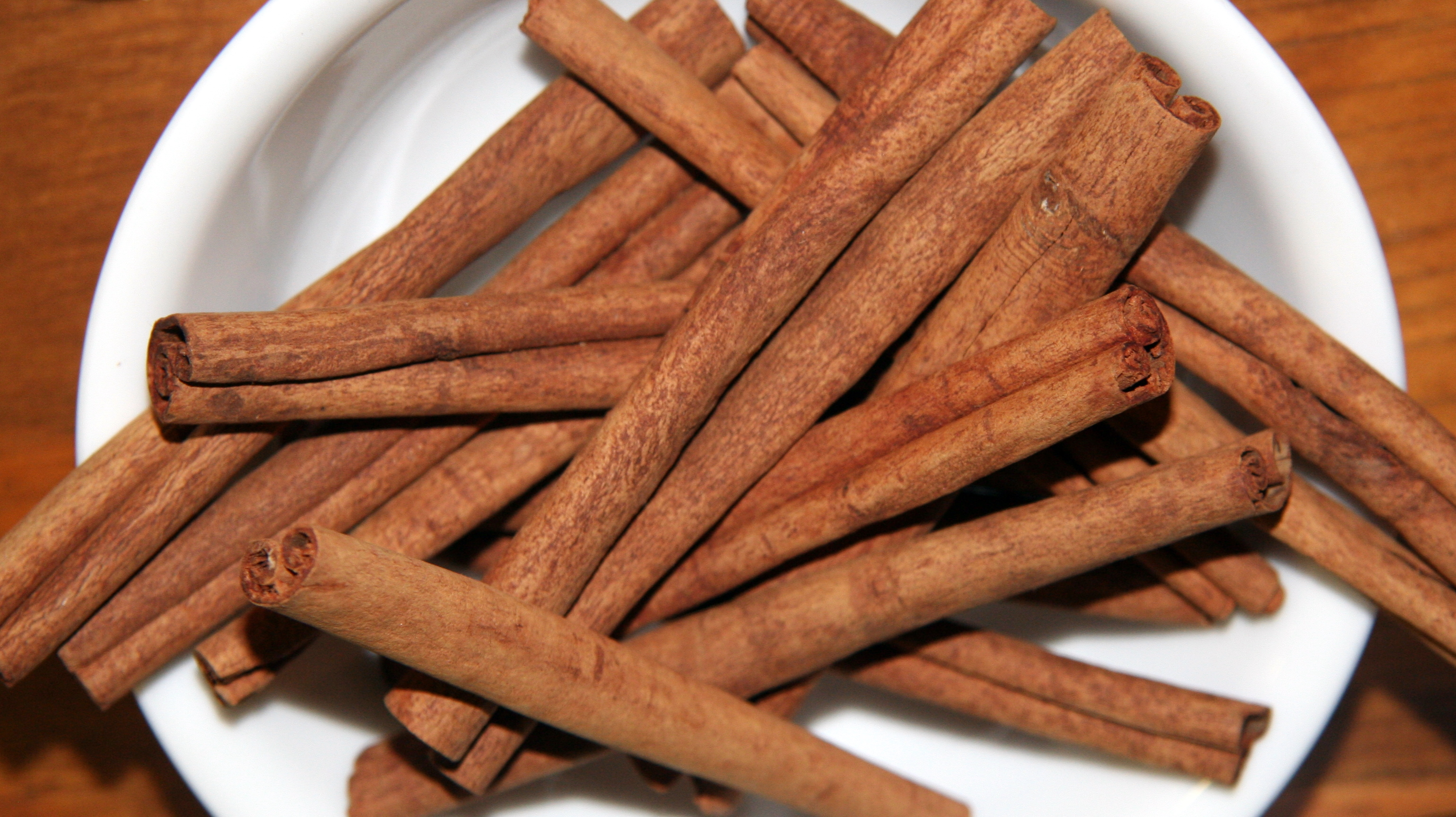
spice bark

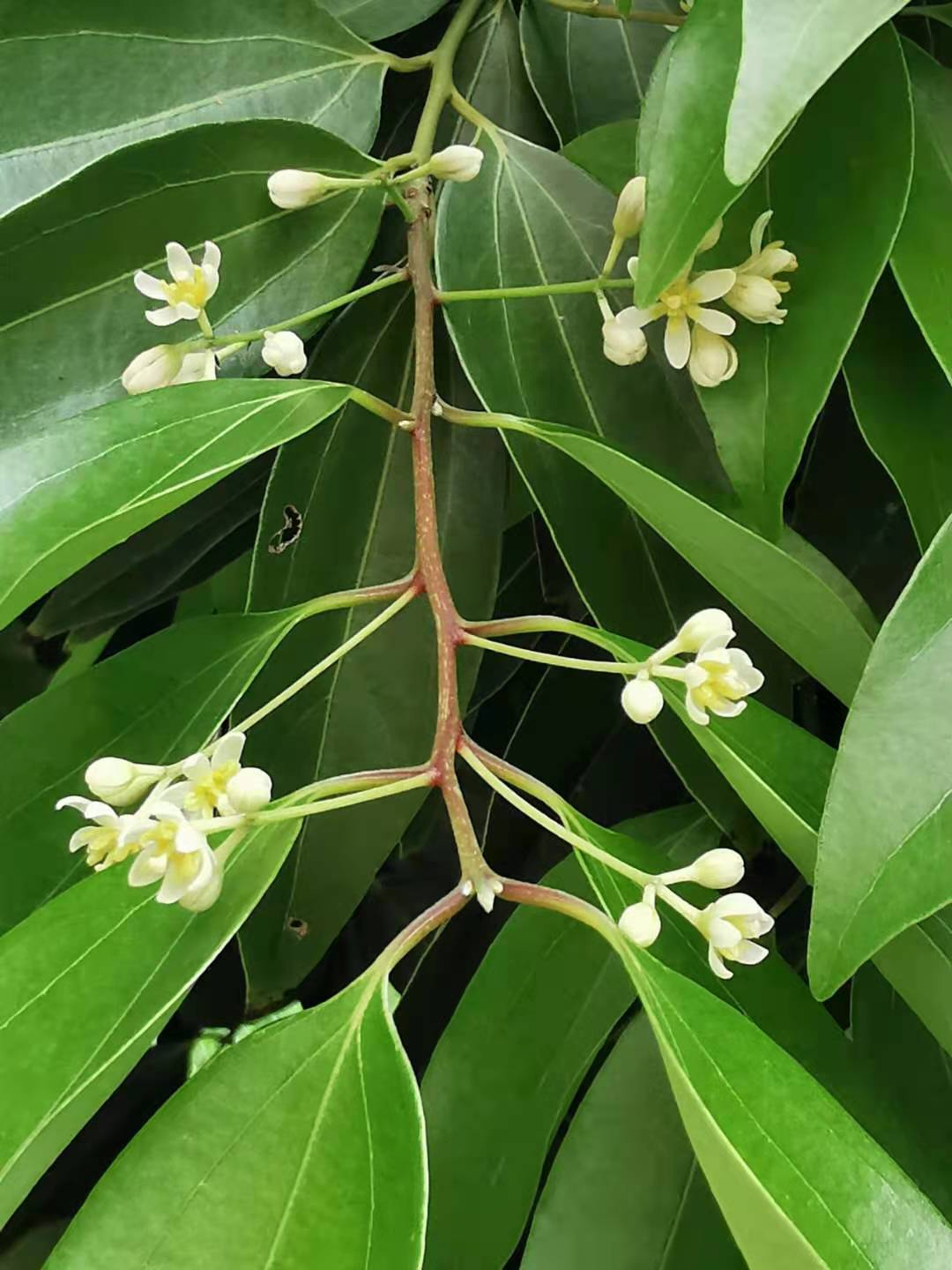
Inflorescence axillary.The new stems is red, which is one of the characteristics of C. burmannii.

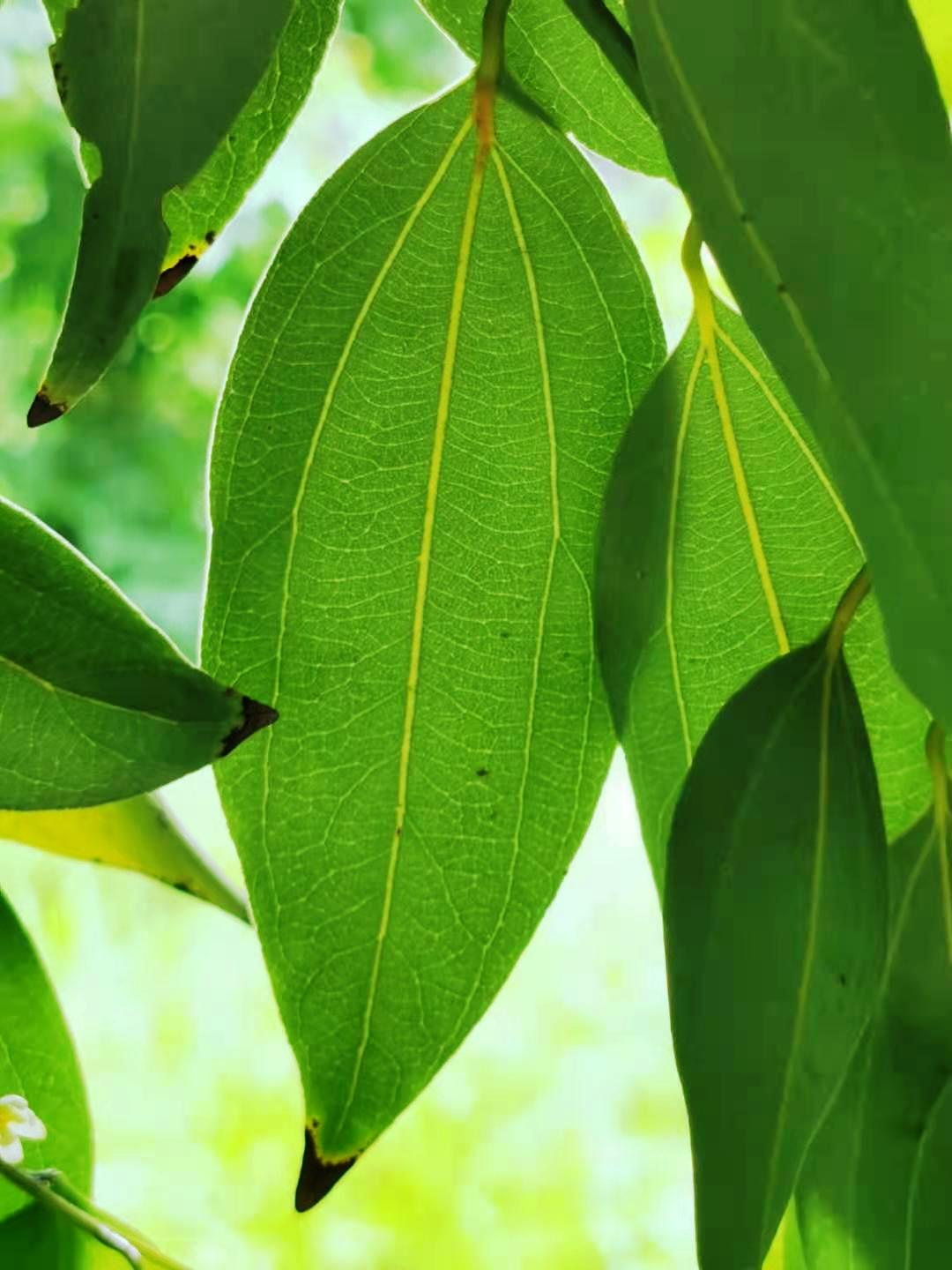
The ternate vein is protruding on the back of the leaf. The leaf surface is smooth.

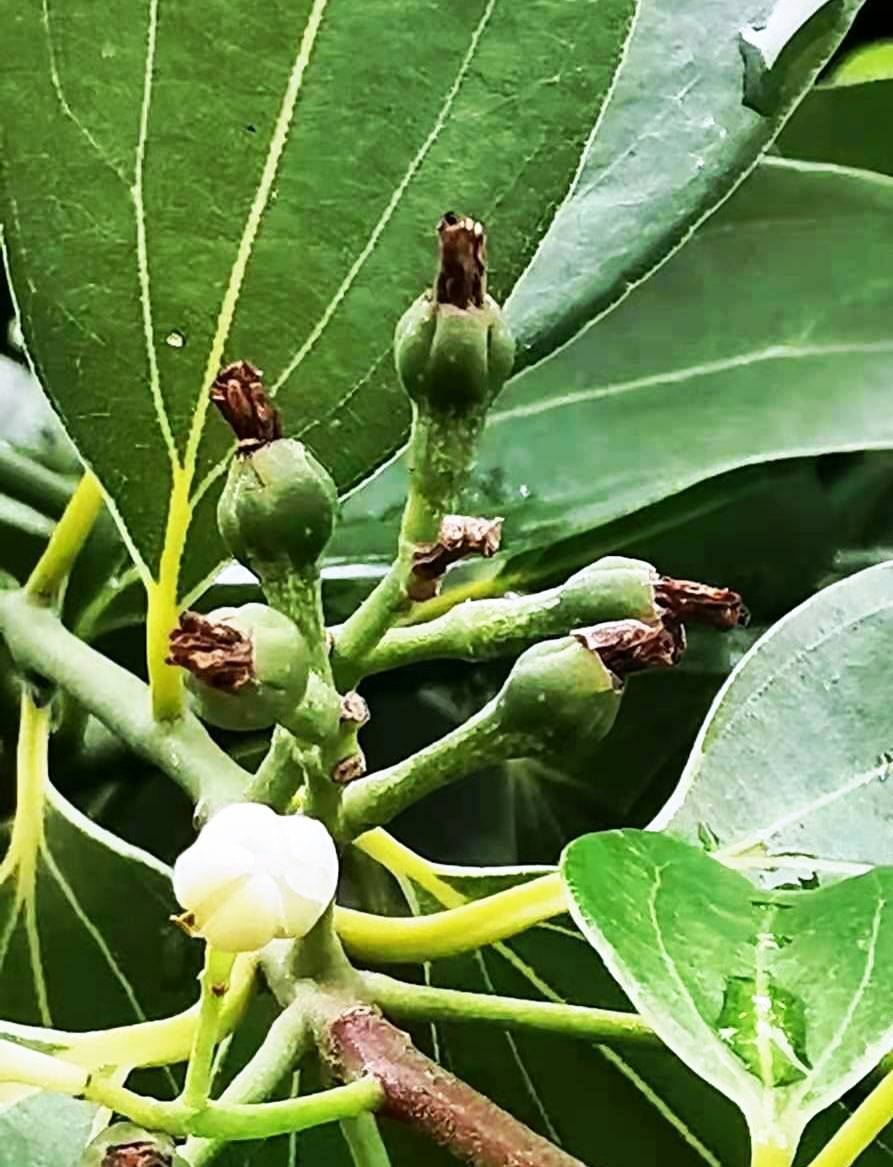
The top of the hypocarp is truncated.

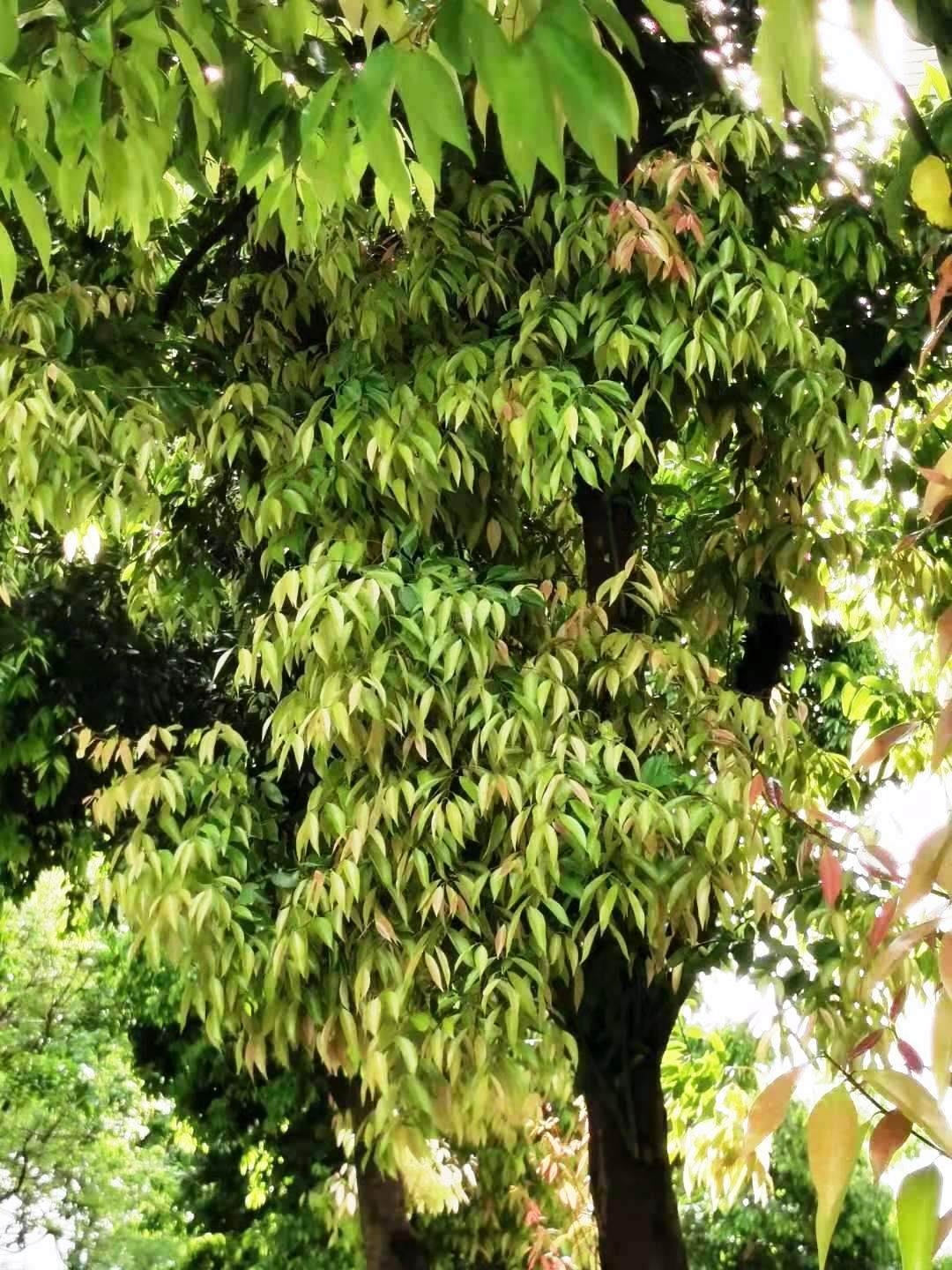
Foliage

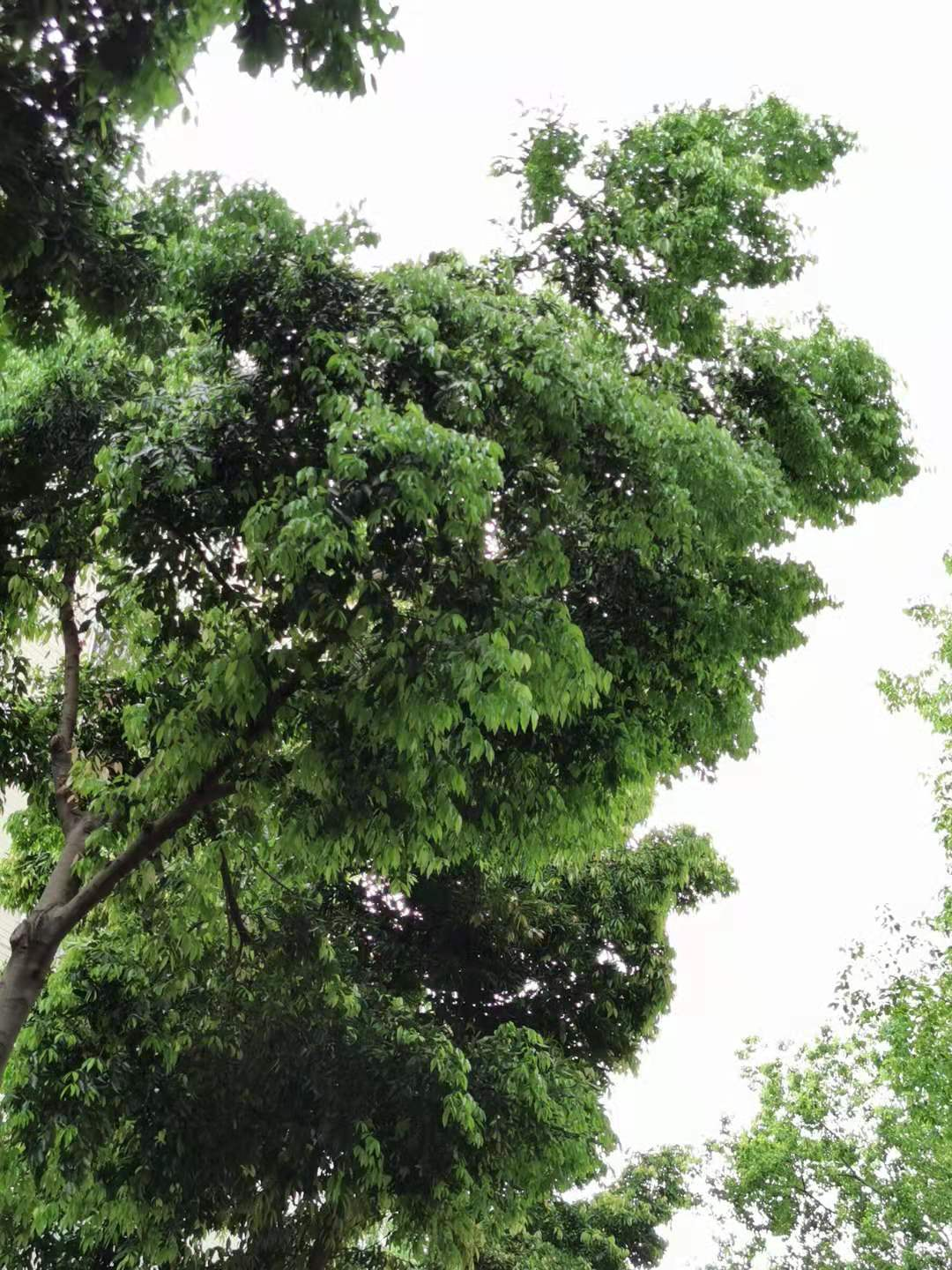
Branches

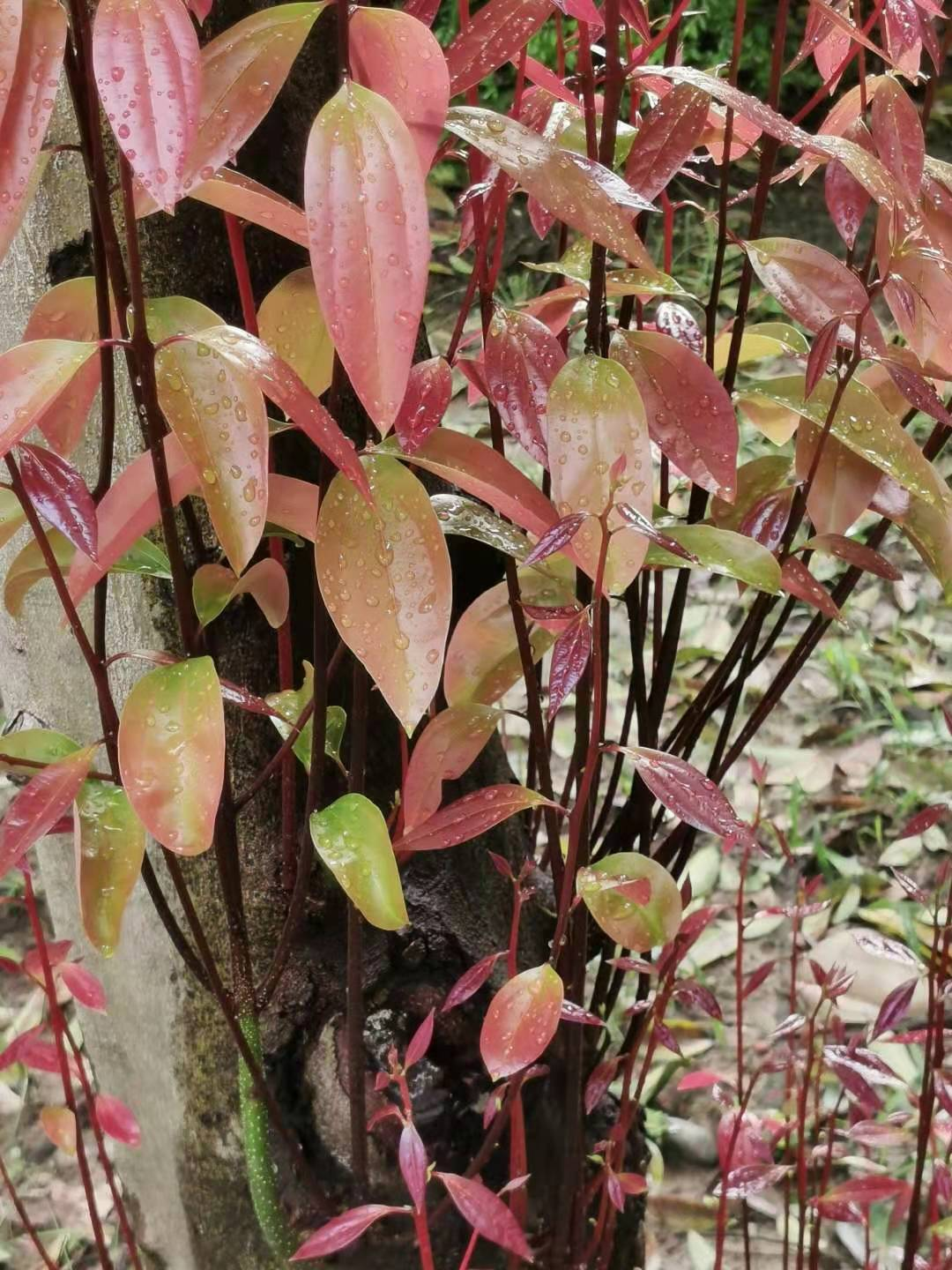
New leaves

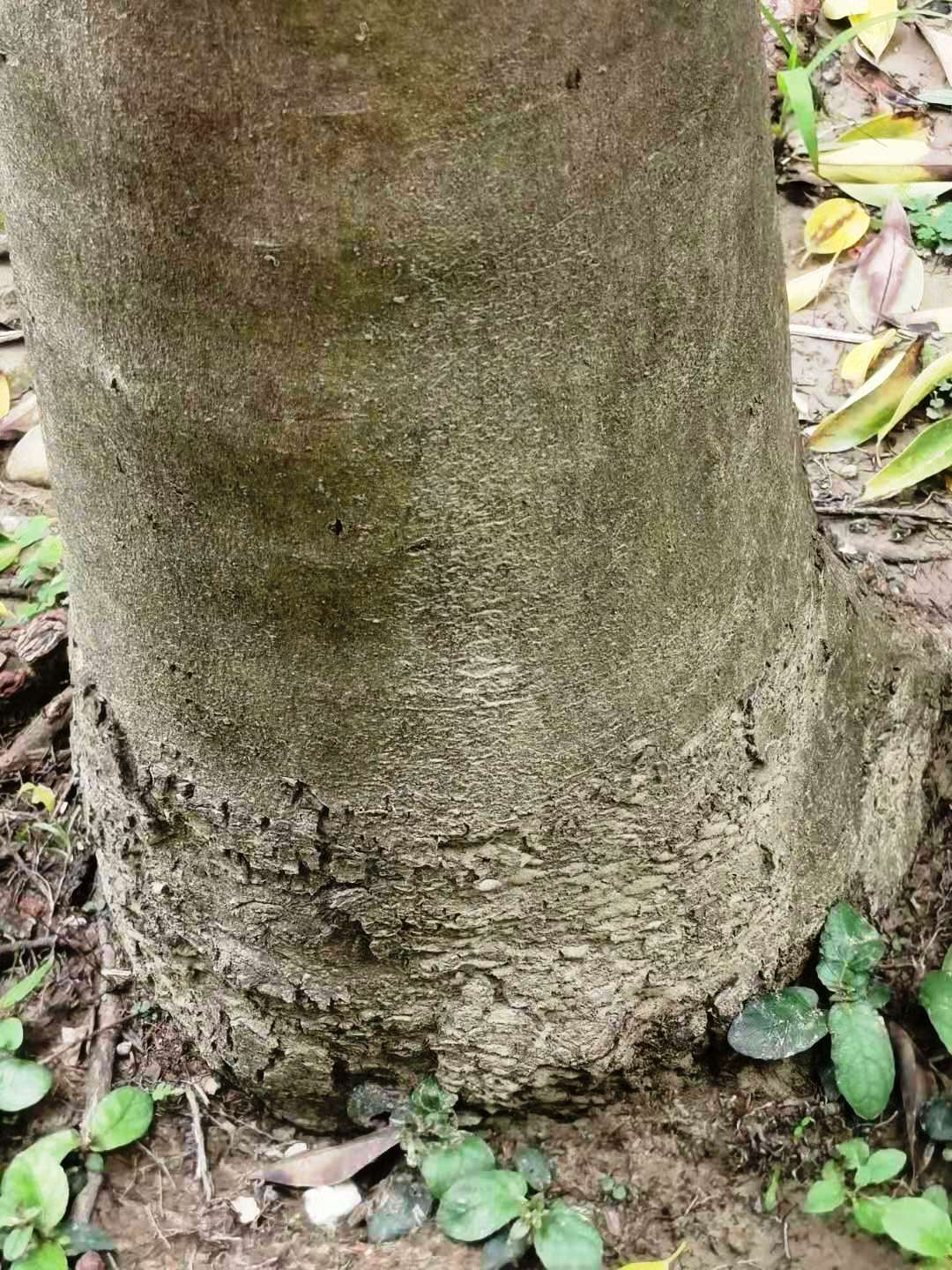
Bark

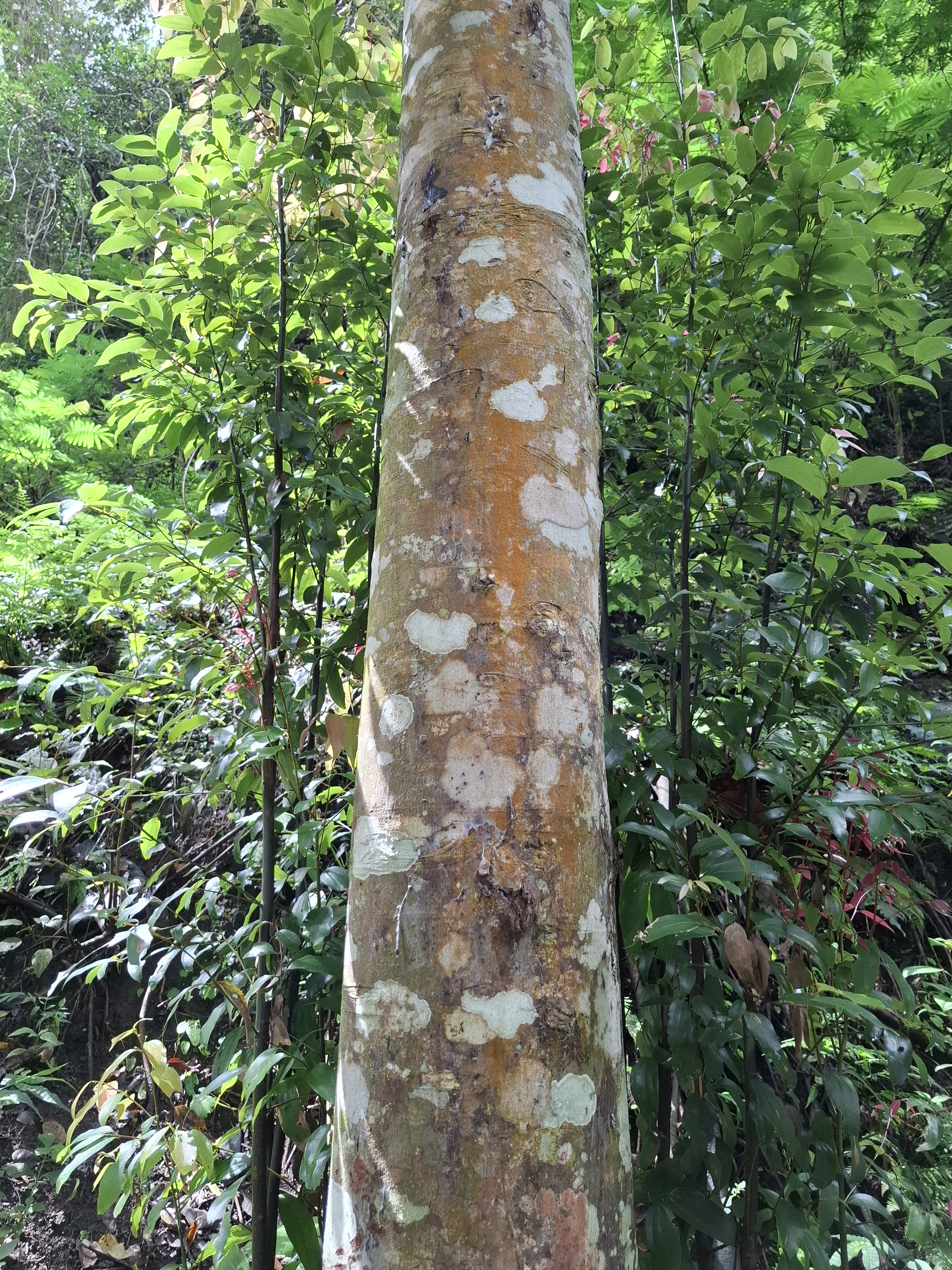
Stem

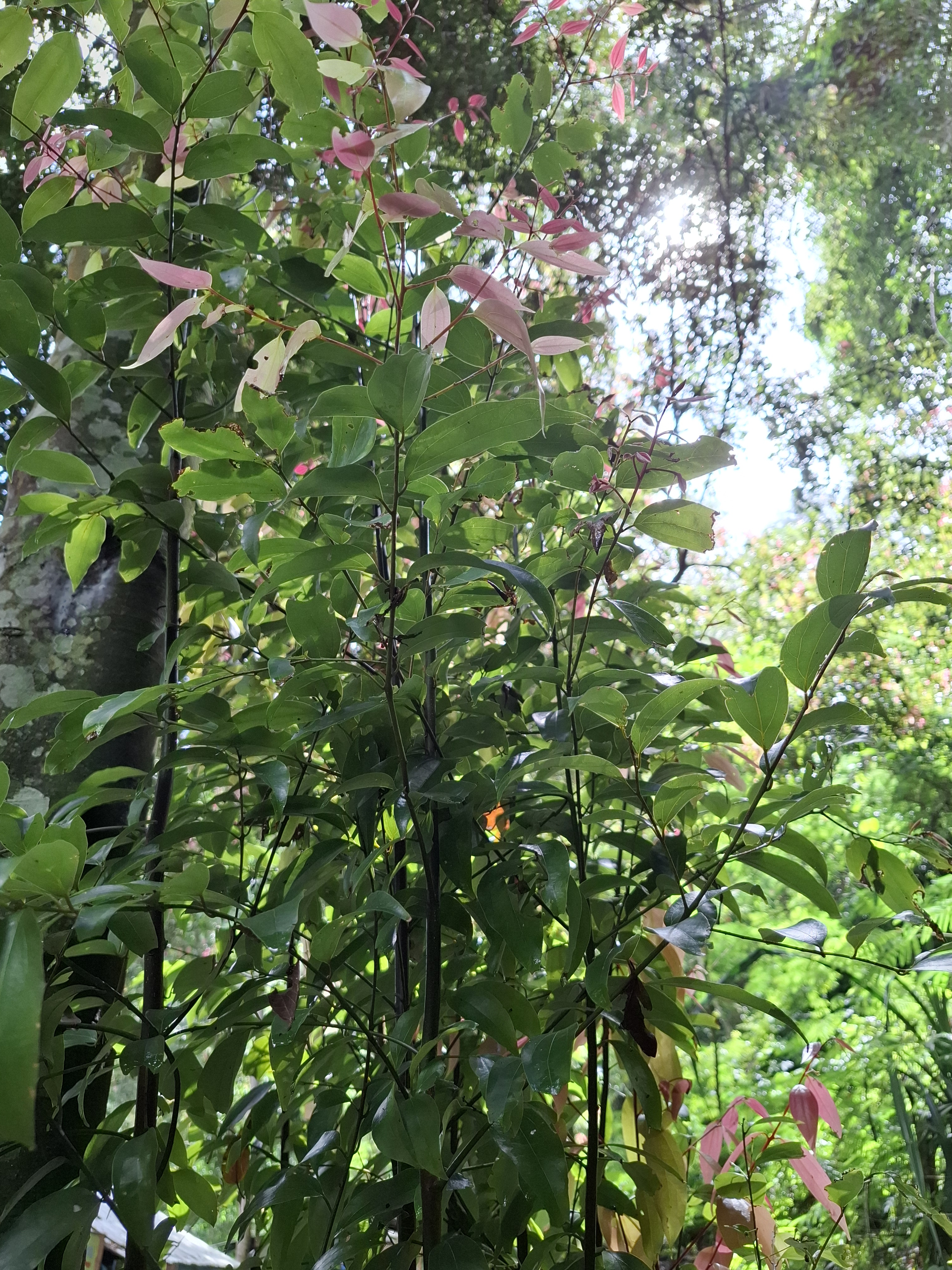
Leaves
