= Sinfire =

Brand of blended whisky

Sinfire Cinnamon Whisky
- Type: Cinnamon Whisky
- Distributor: Hood River Distillers
- Origin: United States
- Introduced: February 2012
- Alcohol by volume: 35%
- Proof (US): 70
- Website: sinfirewhisky.com

Sinfire Cinnamon Whisky is a brand of liqueur made with blended Canadian whisky and cinnamon flavoring. It is imported, bottled, and distributed by Hood River Distillers, located in Hood River, Oregon, United States. Launched in February 2012, the whisky has a flavor reminiscent of Red Hots candy. The 70 proof spirit is available in 1.75 L, 1.0 L, 750 mL, 375 mL and 50 mL sizes.

== Label ==
The product has a thermochromic temperature-sensitive label, which turns the icicles on the back blue when the bottle is chilled. This is intended to inform consumers when the bottle is at the optimal serving temperature of 32 degrees Fahrenheit.

In September 2015, Sinfire released a Limited Edition Northwest Label that featured a lime green and blue label. In August 2016, Sinfire released a green and yellow Limited Edition label.

== Recognition ==
- Silver Medal—2013 Los Angeles International Wine & Spirits Competition
- Silver Medal—2013 Canadian Whisky Awards
- 86 points—2012 Wine Enthusiast
- Triple Gold Medal—2012 MicroLiquor Spirit Awards
- Bronze Medal in the flavored whiskey division—San Francisco World Spirits Competition
- 84 on a 100-point scale in the Canadian whisky category—2012 Ultimate Spirits Challenge
- Best of Class Medal and Platinum Medal in flavored whisky category—2012 Spirits International Prestige (SIP) Awards

== See also ==
- Alcoholic beverages in Oregon
- List of Cocktails
