= Dr. McGillicuddy's =

Canadian liqueurs

Dr. McGillicuddy's is a line of liqueurs produced in Canada and the United States by the Sazerac Company (acquired from Seagram in 1989). It comes in various flavors including Apple Pie, Butterscotch, Cherry, Coffee, Lemon, Mentholmint, Peach, Peppermint, Raw Vanilla, Root Beer, and Wild Grape. Dr. McGillicuddy's liqueurs are between 30 and 60 U.S. proof (15–30% alcohol by volume), depending on the flavor. The liqueurs are available in a range of bottle sizes 50 mL, 100 mL, 200 mL, 375 mL, 750 mL, 1 L and 1.75 L.

== History ==
According to the brand website, a character named Dr. Aloysius Percival McGillicuddy created the liqueur. He lived in the late 19th century as a bartender in an old western town.

In 2016, Sazerac launched several Dr. McGillicuddy branded flavored whiskeys; Apple, Peach, Honey and Blackberry. They are all 60 proof. The flavored whiskey are available in bottle sizes 50 mL, 750 mL and 1 L.

In 2012, the brand was among the 100 largest selling brands by revenue among brands analyzed by SymphonyIRI, and had a market growth rate exceeding 100%.

The brand name has also been used by Sazerac for a New Orleans–based non-alcoholic root beer.

== Discontinued flavors and the rebranding of Fireball ==
Originally, Fireball Cinnamon Whisky was labelled as "Dr. McGillicuddy's Fireball Whisky" when it was introduced by Seagram in the mid-1980s. The "Dr. McGillicuddy's" was dropped from the label in 2007, to differentiate it from the rest of the "Dr. McGillicuddy's" line.

Previously, the lineup included Black Licorice, Black Pepper, Raspberry, and Lemon Drop liqueurs but the company website does not currently list them as being available.
