= Cinnamon bird =

Mythical creature

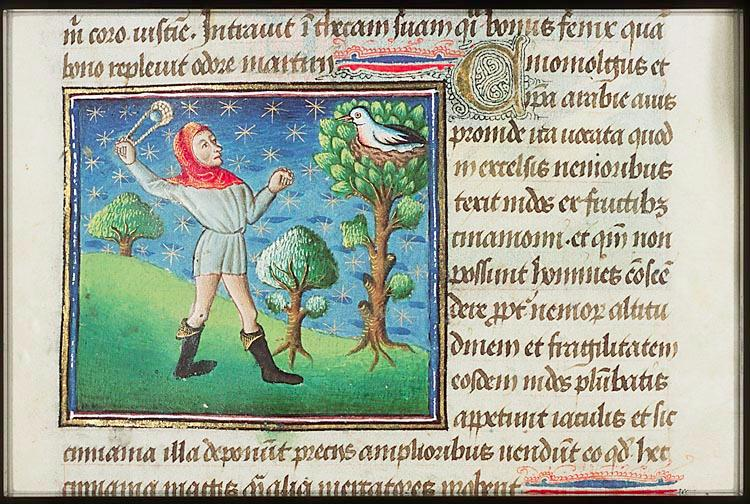
A cinnamon bird, as depicted in a bestiary in a manuscript from Western France, c. 1450.

The cinnamon bird, also known as Cinnamologus, Cinomolgus, or Cynnamolgus is a mythical creature described in various bestiaries as a giant bird that collected cinnamon to build its nests.

== According to Herodotus ==
According to Herodotus in his The History, the cinnamon bird inhabited Arabia, the only country known to produce cinnamon at the time. The giant cinnamon birds collected the cinnamon sticks from an unknown land where the cinnamon trees grew, and used them to construct their nests, fastened to sheer cliffs. The Arabians employed a trick to obtain the cinnamon. They cut oxen and other beasts of burden into pieces, laid them near the birds' nests and withdrew to a distance; the birds were then tempted down to carry the chunks of meat back to their nests, where the weight of the carcasses broke them from the cliffs, leaving the Arabians to collect the fallen cinnamon.

== According to Aristotle ==
In Aristotle's Historia Animalium (History of Animals), one of his works of natural history, he explains that the cinnamon bird brought the cinnamon from unknown locations to build its nest on the slender branches in the tops of high trees. The inhabitants of the bird's home attached leaden weights to their arrow tips to topple the nests, collecting the cinnamon sticks within. Aristotle referred to the bird as kinnamômon orneon.

== According to Pliny the Elder ==
Pliny the Elder adopted a more skeptical view of the cinnamon bird, erroneously named cinnamolgus. He discredited Herodotus specifically and antiquity in general in his Naturalis historia (Natural History) by asserting that the tales were invented by the natives to raise the price of their commodities.

== Other appearances in classical literature ==
- De Natura Animalium (On Animals) by Claudius Aelianus
- Solinus' Collectanea Rerum Memorabilium (Collection of Remarkable Facts)
- Physiologus, a collection of moralized animal tales expanded upon over 1000 years
- A Latin prose bestiary from the 12th century with Aristotle's version of the cinnamon bird
- How We Visited the Land of Satin from Gargantua and Pantagruel by François Rabelais, referred to as cinnamologi
