= Cinnamon =

Spice from Cinnamomum trees

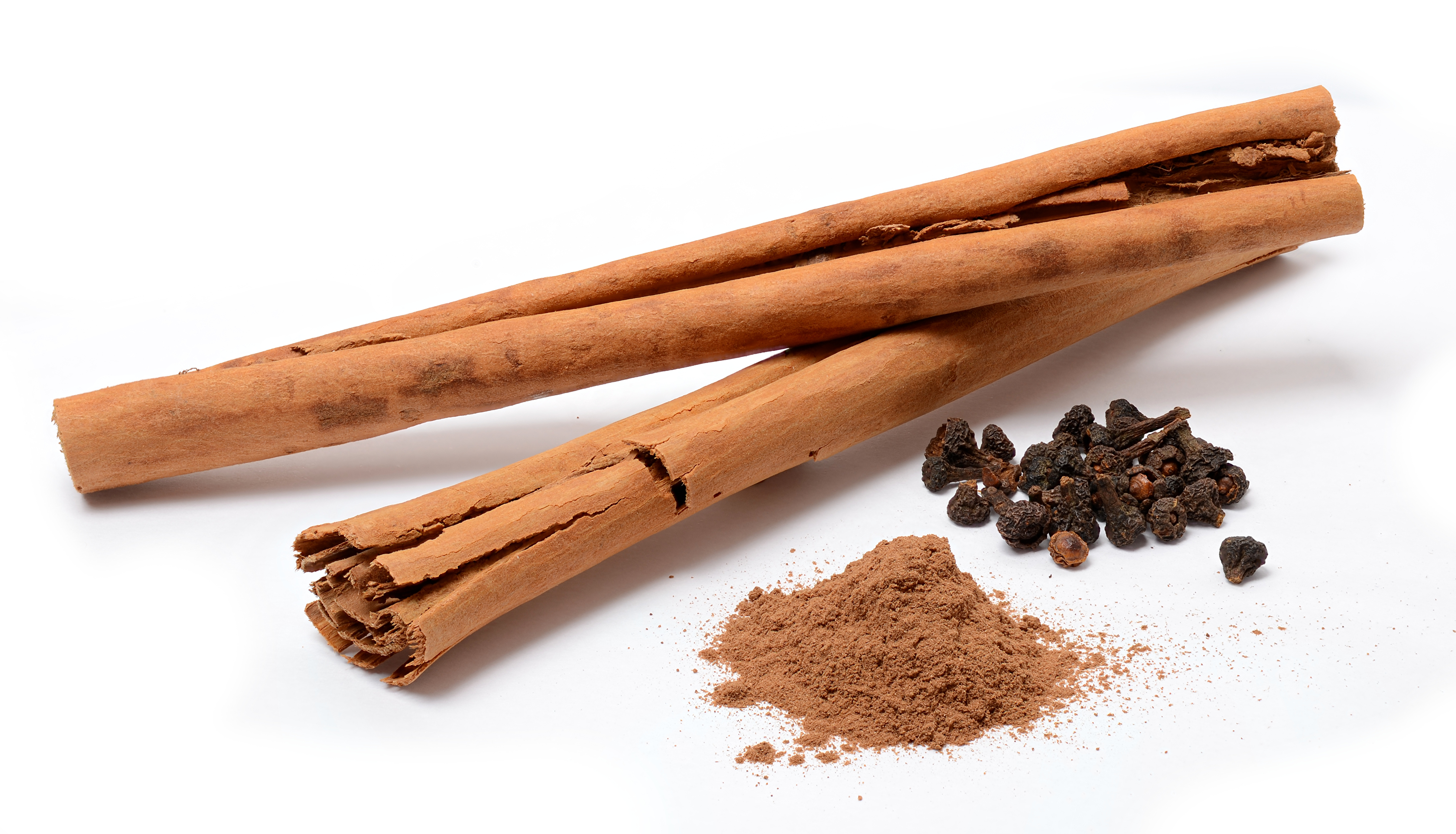
Dried bark strips, bark powder and flowers of the small tree Cinnamomum verum

Cinnamon is a spice obtained from the inner bark of several tree species from the genus Cinnamomum. Cinnamon is used mainly as an aromatic condiment and flavouring additive in a wide variety of cuisines, in particular sweet and savoury dishes such as biscuits, breakfast cereals, snack foods, bagels, teas, hot chocolate, and traditional foods. The characteristic aroma and flavour of cinnamon derive from its essential oil and principal component, cinnamaldehyde, as well as numerous other constituents, including eugenol.

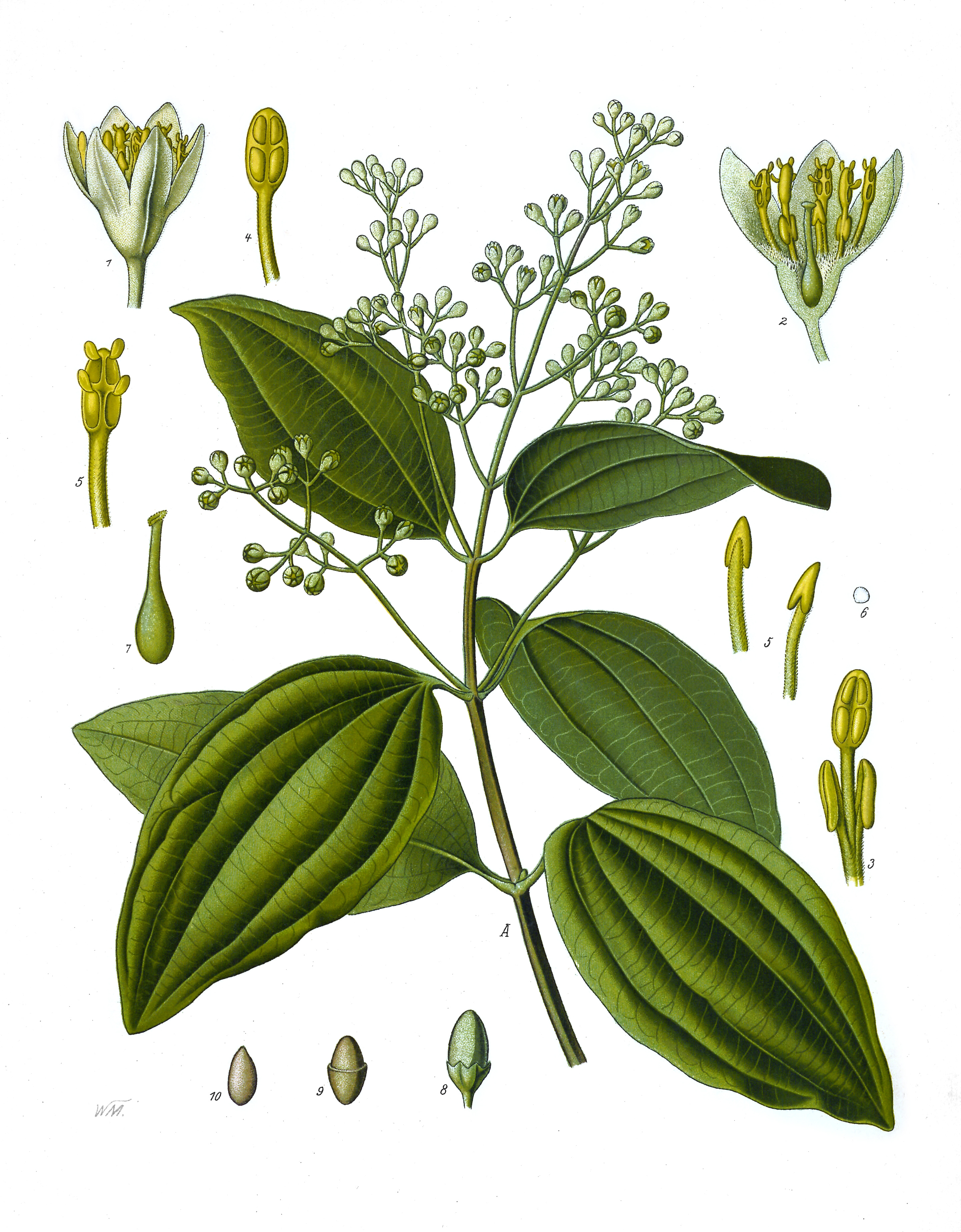
Cinnamomum verum, from Koehler's Medicinal-Plants (1887)

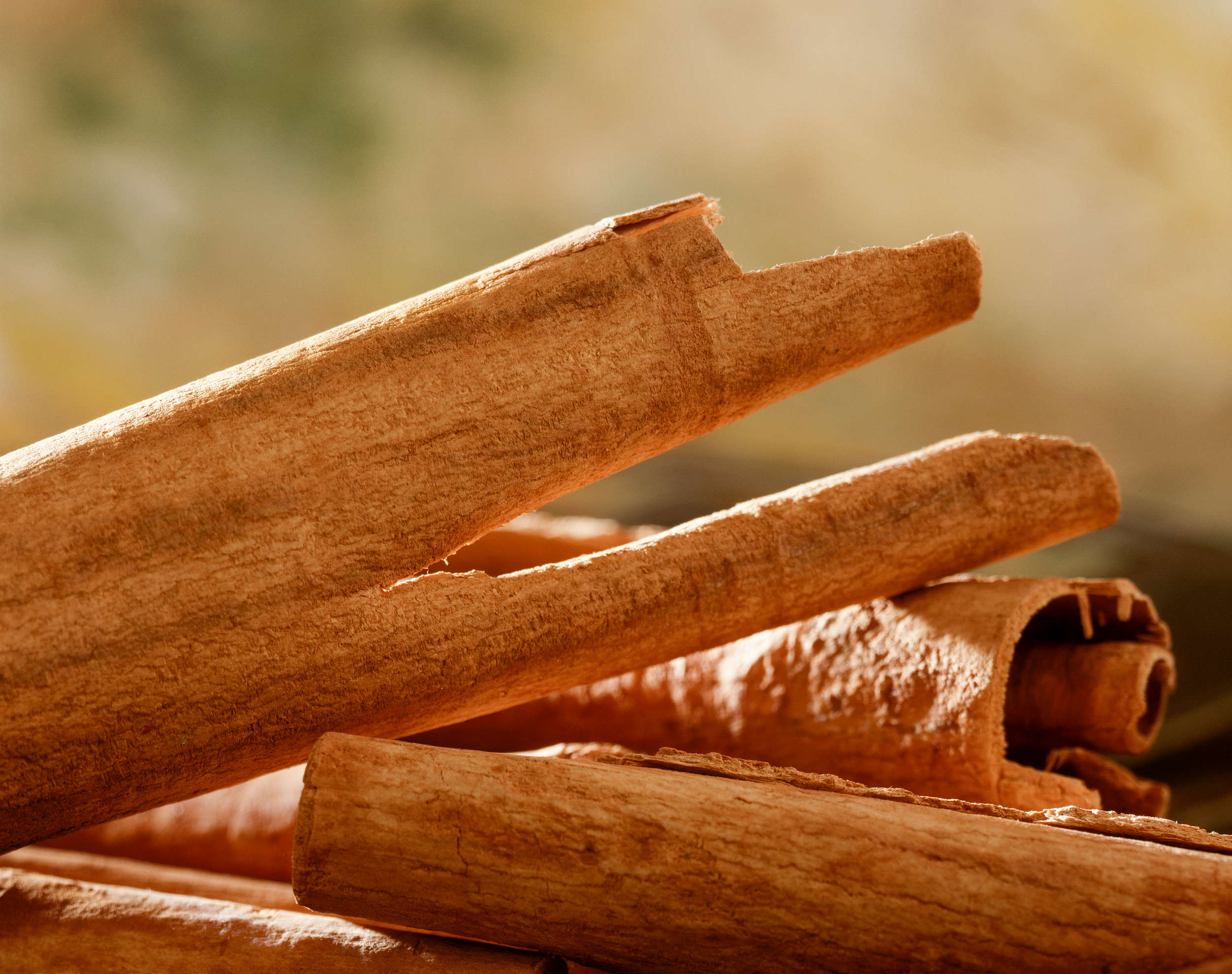
Close-up view of raw cinnamon bark

Cinnamon is the name for several species of trees and the commercial spice products that some of them produce. All are members of the genus Cinnamomum in the family Lauraceae. Only a few Cinnamomum species are grown commercially for spice. Cinnamomum verum (alternatively C. zeylanicum), known as "Ceylon cinnamon" after its origins in Sri Lanka (formerly Ceylon), is considered to be "true cinnamon", but most cinnamon in international commerce is derived from four other species, usually and more correctly referred to as "cassia": C. burmanni (Indonesian cinnamon or Padang cassia), C. cassia (Chinese cinnamon or Chinese cassia), C. loureiroi (Saigon cinnamon or Vietnamese cassia), and the less common C. citriodorum (Malabar cinnamon).

In 2023, world production of cinnamon was 238,403 tonnes, led by China with 39% of the total.

== Etymology ==
The English word "cinnamon", attested in English since the 15th century, derives from the Ancient Greek κιννάμωμον (kinnámōmon, later κίνναμον: kínnamon), via Latin and medieval French intermediate forms. The Greek was borrowed from a Phoenician word, which was similar to the related Hebrew word קנמון (qinnāmōn).

The name "cassia", first recorded in late Old English from Latin, ultimately derives from the Hebrew word קציעה qetsīʿāh, a form of the verb קצע qātsaʿ, "to strip off bark".

Early Modern English also used the names canel and canella, similar to the current names of cinnamon in several other European languages, which are derived from the Latin word cannella, a diminutive of canna, "tube", from the way the bark curls up as it dries.

== History ==
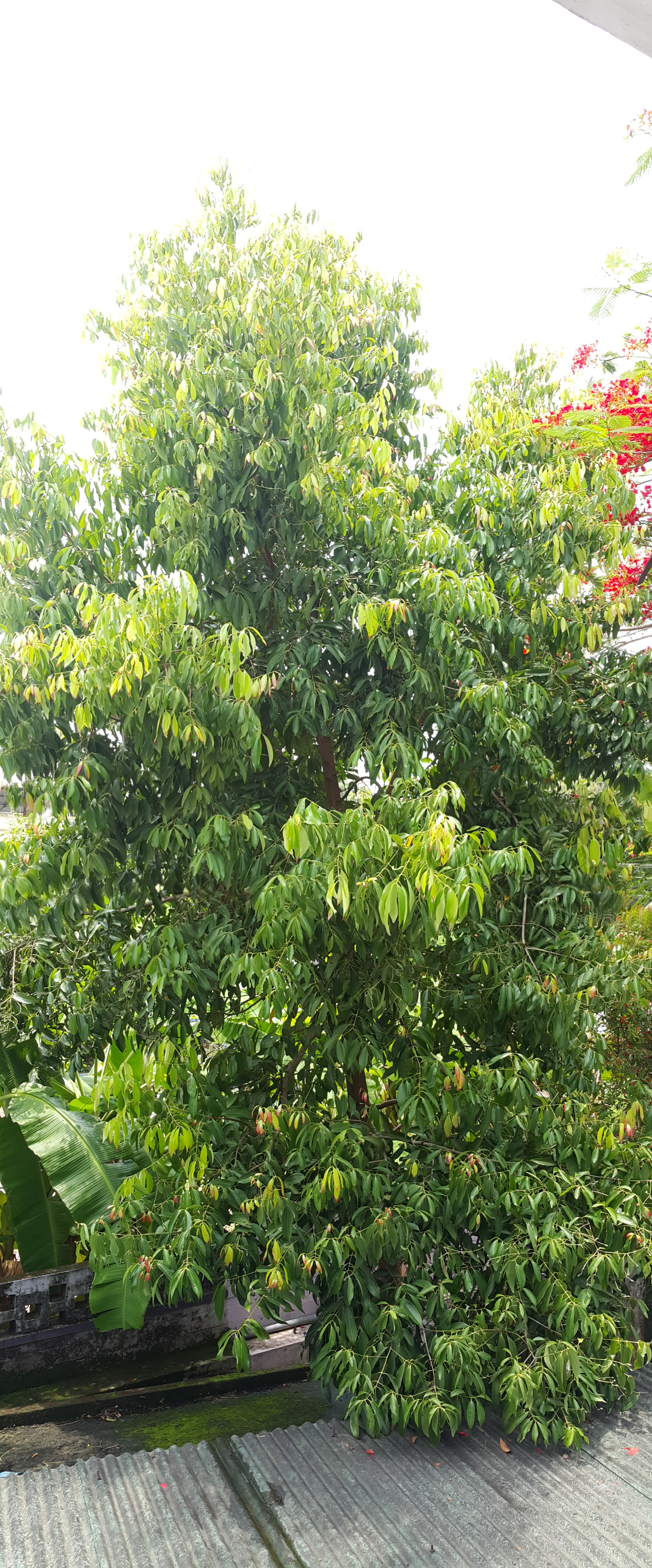
Cinnamon tree

Cinnamon has been known from remote antiquity. It was imported to Egypt as early as 2000 BC, but those who reported that it had come from China had confused it with Cinnamomum cassia, a related species. Cinnamon was so highly prized among ancient nations that it was regarded as a gift fit for monarchs. Its source was kept a trade secret in the Mediterranean world for centuries by those in the spice trade to protect their monopoly as suppliers.

In Ancient Egypt, cinnamon was used to embalm mummies. From the Ptolemaic Kingdom onward, Ancient Egyptian recipes for kyphi, an aromatic used for burning, included cinnamon and cassia. The gifts of Hellenistic rulers to temples sometimes included cassia and cinnamon.

The first Greek reference to κασία kasía is found in a poem by Sappho in the 7th century BC. According to Herodotus, both cinnamon and cassia grew in Arabia, together with incense, myrrh, and labdanum, and were guarded by winged serpents. Herodotus, Aristotle and other authors named Arabia as the source of cinnamon; they recounted that giant "cinnamon birds" collected the cinnamon sticks from an unknown land where the cinnamon trees grew and used them to construct their nests.

Pliny the Elder wrote that cinnamon was brought around the Arabian Peninsula on "rafts without rudders or sails or oars", taking advantage of the winter trade winds. He also mentioned cassia as a flavouring agent for wine, and that the tales of cinnamon being collected from the nests of cinnamon birds was a traders' fiction made up to charge more. However, the story remained current in Byzantium as late as 1310.

According to Pliny the Elder, a Roman pound (327 grams [11.5 oz]) of cassia, cinnamon (serichatum), cost up to 1,500 denarii, the wage of fifty months' labour. Diocletian's Edict on Maximum Prices from 301 AD gives a price of 125 denarii for a pound of cassia, while an agricultural labourer earned 25 denarii per day. Cinnamon was too expensive to be commonly used on funeral pyres in Rome, but the Emperor Nero is said to have burned a year's worth of the city's supply at the funeral for his wife Poppaea Sabina in AD 65.

=== Middle Ages ===
Through the Middle Ages, the cinnamon-based cameline sauce was among the most common at tables in Western Europe. However, the source of the spice remained a mystery to the Western world. From reading Latin writers who quoted Herodotus, Europeans had learned that cinnamon came up the Red Sea to the trading ports of Egypt, but where it came from was less than clear. When the Sieur de Joinville accompanied his king, Louis IX of France to Egypt on the Seventh Crusade in 1248, he reported—and believed—what he had been told: that cinnamon was fished up in nets at the source of the Nile out at the edge of the world (i.e., Ethiopia). Marco Polo avoided precision on the topic.

The first mention that the spice grew in the area of India was in Maimonides's Mishneh Torah, about 1180. The first mention that the spice grew specifically in Sri Lanka was in Zakariya al-Qazwini's Athar al-bilad wa-akhbar al-'ibad ("Monument of Places and History of God's Bondsmen") about 1270. This was followed shortly thereafter by John of Montecorvino in a letter of about 1292.

Indonesian rafts transported cinnamon directly from the Moluccas to East Africa (see also Rhapta), where local traders then carried it north to Alexandria in Egypt. Venetian traders from Italy held a monopoly on the spice trade in Europe, distributing cinnamon from Alexandria. The disruption of this trade by the rise of other Mediterranean powers, such as the Mamluk sultans and the Ottoman Empire, was one of many factors that led Europeans to search more widely for other routes to Asia.

=== Early modern period ===
During the 1500s, Ferdinand Magellan was searching for spices on behalf of Spain; in the Philippines, he found Cinnamomum mindanaense, which was closely related to C. zeylanicum, the cinnamon found in Sri Lanka. This cinnamon eventually competed with Sri Lankan cinnamon, which was controlled by the Portuguese.

In 1638, Dutch traders established a trading post in Sri Lanka, took control of the manufactories by 1640, and expelled the remaining Portuguese by 1658. "The shores of the island are full of it," a Dutch captain reported, "and it is the best in all the Orient. When one is downwind of the island, one can still smell cinnamon eight leagues out to sea." The Dutch East India Company continued to overhaul the methods of harvesting in the wild and eventually began to cultivate its own trees.

In 1767, Lord Brown of the British East India Company established the Anjarakkandy Cinnamon Estate near Anjarakkandy in the Kannur district of Kerala, India. It later became Asia's largest cinnamon estate. The British seized control of Ceylon from the Dutch in 1796.

== Cultivation ==
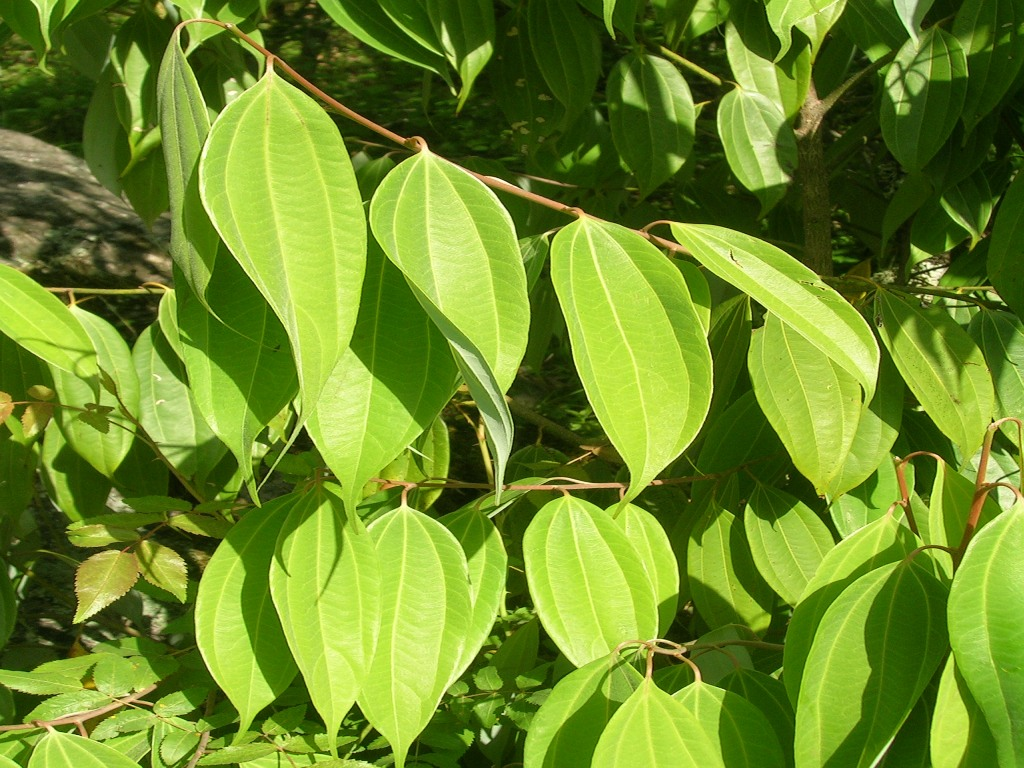
Leaves from a wild cinnamon tree

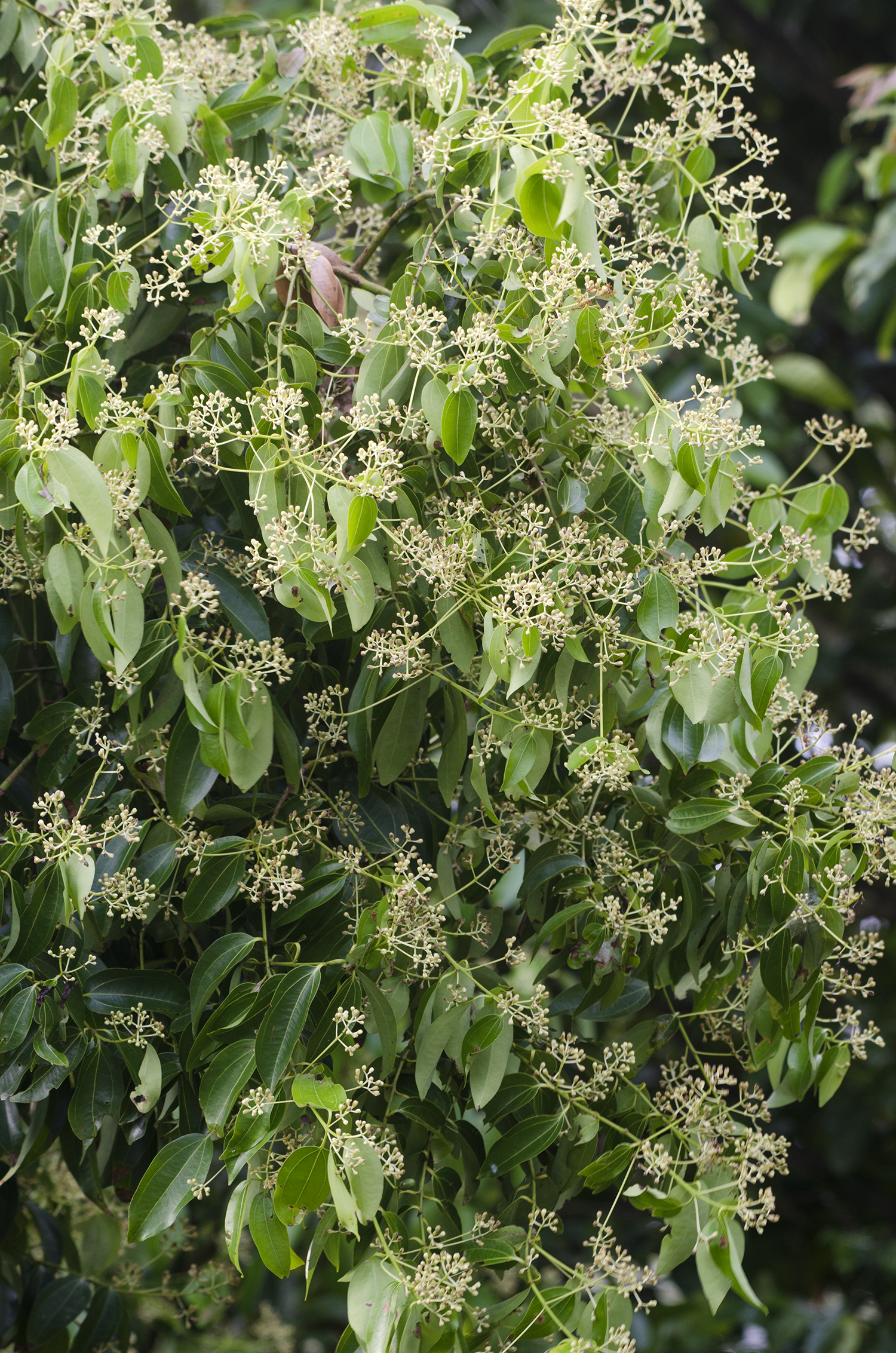
Cinnamon flowers

Cinnamon is an evergreen tree characterised by oval-shaped leaves, thick bark, and a berry fruit. When harvesting the spice, the bark and leaves are the primary parts of the plant used. However, in Japan, the more pungent roots are harvested to produce nikki (ニッキ), which is a product distinct from cinnamon (シナモン shinamon). Cinnamon is cultivated by growing the tree for two years, then coppicing it, i.e., cutting the stems at ground level. The following year, about a dozen new shoots form from the roots, replacing those that were cut. A number of pests such as Colletotrichum gloeosporioides, Diplodia species and Phytophthora cinnamomi (stripe canker) can affect the growing plants.

The stems must be processed immediately after harvesting while the inner bark is still wet. The cut stems are processed by scraping off the outer bark, then beating the branch evenly with a hammer to loosen the inner bark, which is then pried off in long rolls. Only 0.5 mm (0.02 in) of the inner bark is used; (Note: Cassia bark is thicker than Sri Lankan cinnamon.) the outer, woody portion is discarded, leaving metre-long cinnamon strips that curl into rolls ("quills") on drying. The processed bark dries completely in four to six hours, provided it is in a well-ventilated and relatively warm environment. Once dry, the bark is cut into 5 to 10 cm (2 to 4 in) lengths for sale.

A less-than-ideal drying environment encourages the proliferation of pests in the bark, which may then require treatment by fumigation with sulphur dioxide. In 2011, the European Union approved the use of sulphur dioxide at a concentration of up to 150 mg/kg (0.0024 oz/lb) for the treatment of C. verum bark harvested in Sri Lanka.

=== Species ===
Several species are often sold as cinnamon:

- Cinnamomum cassia (Cassia or Chinese cinnamon, the most common commercial type in the USA)
- C. burmanni (Korintje, Padang cassia, or Indonesian cinnamon)
- C. loureiroi (Saigon cinnamon, Vietnamese cassia, or Vietnamese cinnamon)
- C. verum (Sri Lanka cinnamon, Ceylon cinnamon or Cinnamomum zeylanicum)
- C. citriodorum (Malabar cinnamon)

Cassia induces a strong, spicy flavour and is often used in baking, especially associated with cinnamon rolls, as it handles baking conditions well. Among cassia, Chinese cinnamon is generally medium to light reddish-brown, hard and woody in texture, and thicker (2–3 mm (0.079–0.118 in) thick), as all of the layers of bark are used. Ceylon cinnamon, using only the thin inner bark, has a lighter brown colour and a finer, less dense, and more crumbly texture. It is subtle and more aromatic in flavour than cassia, and it loses much of its flavour during cooking.

The barks of the species are easily distinguished when whole, both in macroscopic and microscopic characteristics. Ceylon cinnamon sticks (quills) have many thin layers and can easily be made into powder using a coffee or spice grinder, whereas cassia sticks are much harder. Indonesian cinnamon is often sold in neat quills made up of one thick layer, capable of damaging a spice or coffee grinder. Saigon cinnamon (C. loureiroi) and Chinese cinnamon (C. cassia) are always sold as broken pieces of thick bark, as the bark is not supple enough to be rolled into quills.

The powdered bark is harder to distinguish, but if it is treated with tincture of iodine (a test for starch), little effect is visible with pure Ceylon cinnamon; however, when Chinese cinnamon is present, a deep-blue tint is produced.

=== Grading, of quills ===
The Sri Lankan grading system divides the cinnamon quills into four groups:

- Alba, less than 6 mm (0.24 in) in diameter
- Continental, less than 16 mm (0.63 in) in diameter
- Mexican, less than 19 mm (0.75 in) in diameter
- Hamburg, less than 32 mm (1.3 in) in diameter

These groups are further divided into specific grades. For example, Mexican is divided into M00000 special, M000000 and M0000, depending on quill diameter and number of quills per kilogram. Any pieces of bark less than 106 mm (4.2 in) long are categorised as quillings. Featherings are the inner bark of twigs and twisted shoots. Chips are trimmings of quills, outer and inner bark that cannot be separated, or the bark of small twigs.

== Production ==
Cinnamon production 2023, tonnes
China	91,892
Vietnam	65,341
Indonesia	55,213
Sri Lanka	22,410
World	238,403
Source: FAOSTAT of the United Nations

In 2023, four countries accounted for 98% of the world's cinnamon production, a total of 238,403 tonnes: China, Vietnam, Indonesia, and Sri Lanka.

=== Counterfeit ===
True cinnamon from C. verum bark can be mixed with cassia (C. cassia) as counterfeit and falsely marketed as authentic cinnamon. In one analysis, authentic Ceylon cinnamon bark contained 12–143 mg/kg of coumarin – a phenolic typically low in content in true cinnamon – but market samples contained coumarin with levels as high as 3462 mg/kg, indicating probable contamination with cassia in the counterfeit cinnamon. ConsumerLab.com found the same problem in a 2020 analysis; "a supplement that contained the highest amount of coumarin was labeled as Ceylon cinnamon".

== Food uses ==
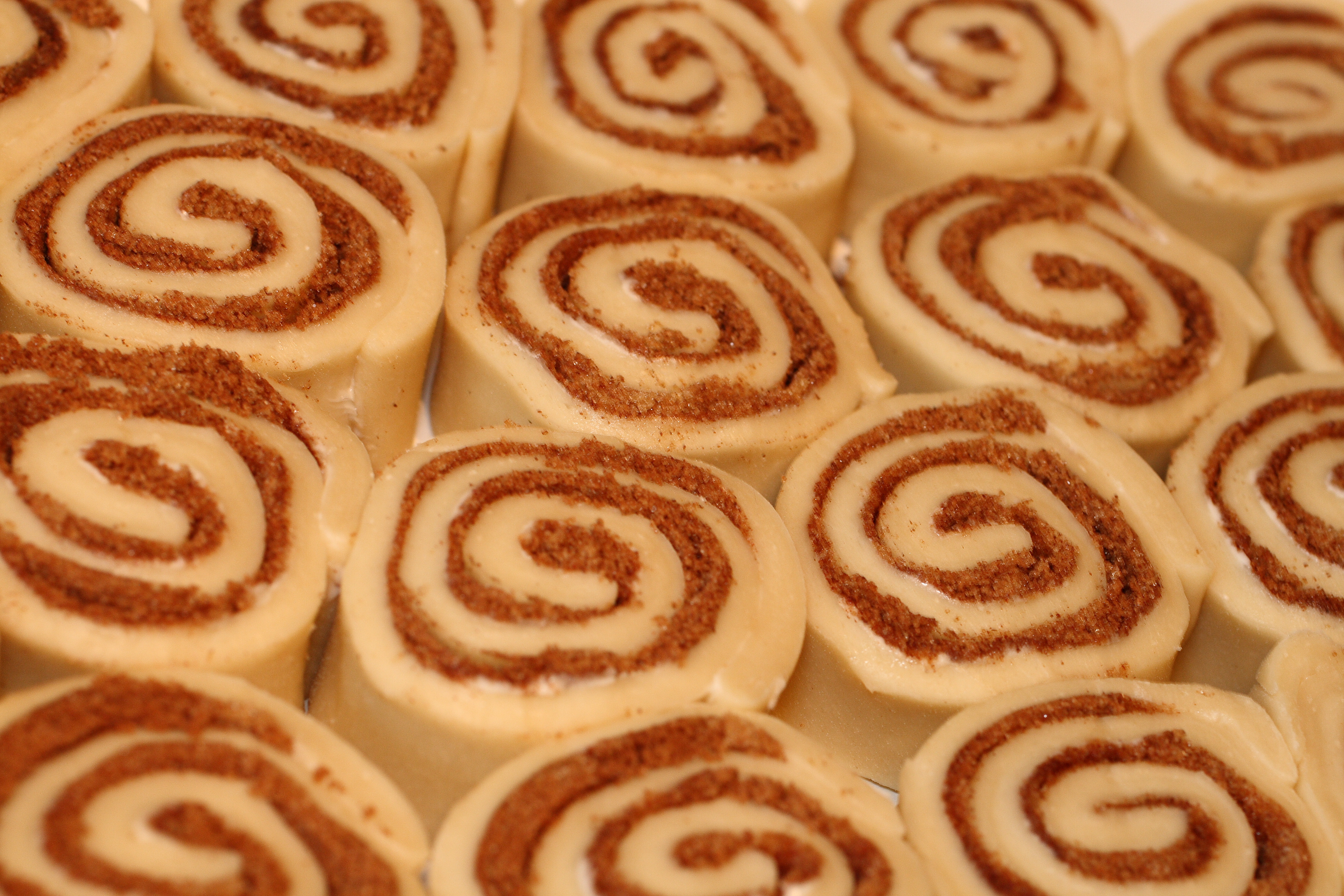
Uncooked cinnamon rolls

Cinnamon bark is used as a spice. It is principally employed in cookery as a condiment and flavouring material. It is used in the preparation of chocolate, especially in Mexico. Cinnamon is often used in savoury dishes of chicken and lamb. In the United States and Europe, cinnamon and sugar are often used to flavour cereals, bread-based dishes such as toast, and fruits, especially apples; a cinnamon and sugar mixture (cinnamon sugar) is sold separately for such purposes. It is also used in Portuguese and Turkish cuisine for both sweet and savoury dishes. Cinnamon can also be used in pickling, and in Christmas drinks such as eggnog and mulled wine. Cinnamon powder has long been an important spice in enhancing the flavour of Persian cuisine, used in a variety of thick soups, drinks, and sweets.

Cinnamon is a common ingredient in Jewish cuisine across various communities. In Sephardic cooking, it is incorporated into vegetable stews and desserts such as tishpishti and travados, both of which are soaked in honey. In Ashkenazi cuisine, cinnamon features in dishes like honey cakes, and kugels. It is also one of "four sibling spices" (rempah empat beradik) essential in Malay cuisine along with clove, star anise and cardamom.

== Nutrient composition ==
Cinnamon, spice, ground
Nutritional value per 100 g (3.5 oz)
- Energy: 1,035 kJ (247 kcal)
- Carbohydrates: 80.6 g
- Sugars: 2.2 g
- Dietary fibre: 53.1 g
- Fat: 1.2 g
- Protein: 4 g
Vitamins and minerals
Vitamins	Quantity %DV^{†}
Vitamin A equiv.	2% 15 μg
Thiamine (B1)	2% 0.02 mg
Riboflavin (B2)	3% 0.04 mg
Niacin (B3)	8% 1.33 mg
Vitamin B6	9% 0.16 mg
Folate (B9)	2% 6 μg
Vitamin C	4% 3.8 mg
Vitamin E	15% 2.3 mg
Vitamin K	26% 31.2 μg
Minerals	Quantity %DV^{†}
Calcium	77% 1002 mg
Iron	46% 8.3 mg
Magnesium	14% 60 mg
Phosphorus	5% 64 mg
Potassium	14% 431 mg
Sodium	0% 10 mg
Zinc	16% 1.8 mg
- Other constituents: Quantity
- Water: 10.6 g
- Source: USDA Database
- ^{†}Percentages estimated using US recommendations for adults, except for potassium, which is estimated based on expert recommendation from the National Academies.

Ground cinnamon is 11% water, 81% carbohydrates (including 53% dietary fibre), 4% protein and 1% fat.

== Characteristics ==
=== Texture ===
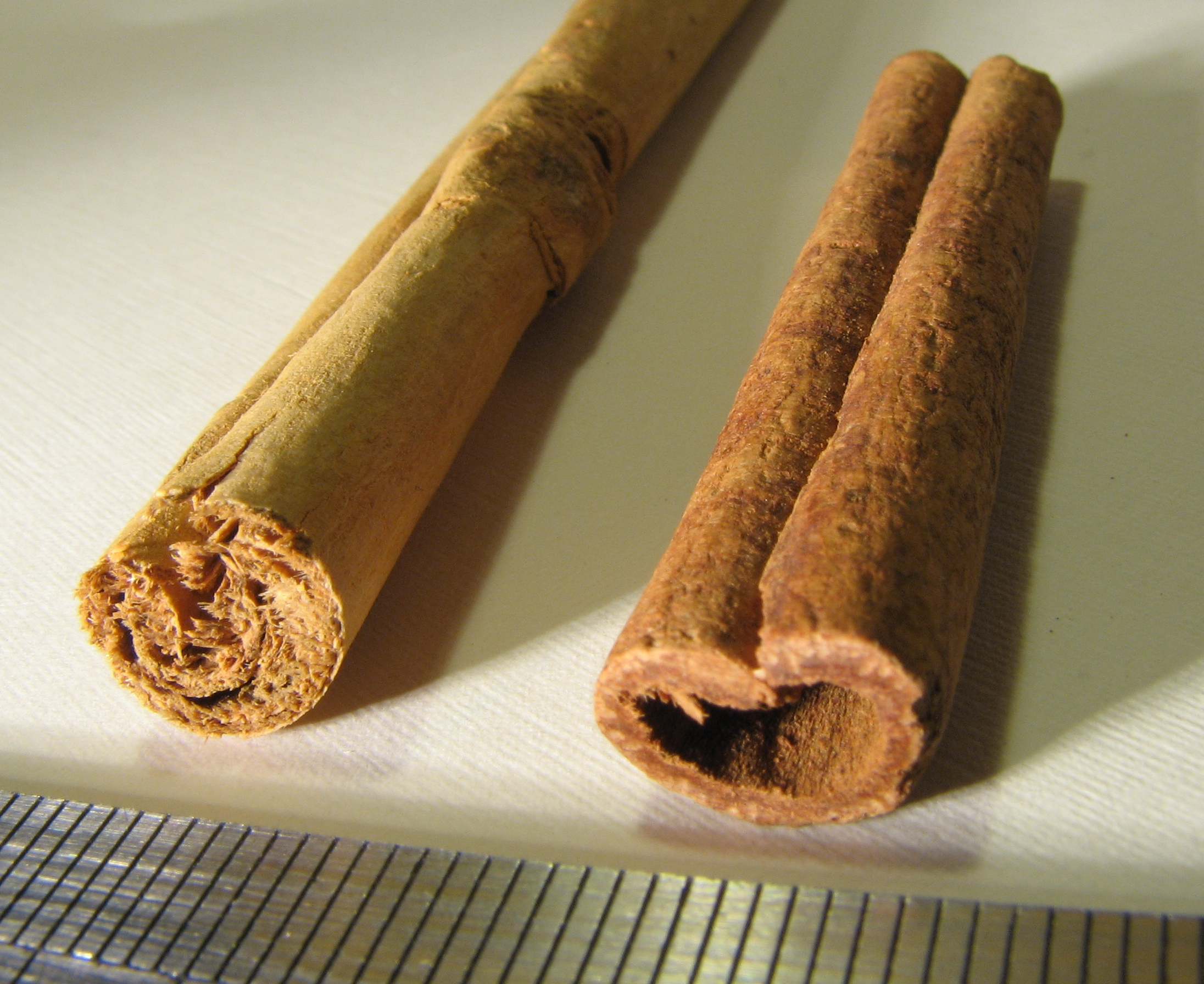
Quills of Ceylon cinnamon (Cinnamomum verum, left) and Indonesian cinnamon (C. burmanni, right)

Ceylon cinnamon can be crushed into small pieces by hand, while Indonesian cinnamon requires a powerful blender.

=== Flavour, aroma and taste ===
The flavour of cinnamon is due to the aromatic essential oils that make up 0.5 to 1% of its composition.

Cinnamon bark can be macerated, then extracted in 80% ethanol, to a tincture.

Cinnamon essential oil can be prepared by roughly pounding the bark, macerating it in sea water, and then quickly distilling the whole. It is golden-yellow, with the characteristic odour of cinnamon and a very hot aromatic taste.

Cinnamon oil nanoemulsion can be made with polysorbate 80, cinnamon essential oil, and water, by ultrasonic emulsification.

Cinnamon oil macroemulsion can be made with a dispersing emulsifying homogeniser.

Cinnamaldehyde is responsible for the pungent taste and scent, and constitutes about 90% of cinnamon bark essential oil. Cinnamaldehyde decomposes, in high humidity and high temperatures, to styrene, and, by reaction with oxygen as it ages, it darkens in colour and forms resinous compounds.

Cinnamon constituents include some 80 aromatic compounds, including eugenol, found in the oil from leaves or bark of cinnamon trees.

==== Alcohol flavourant ====
Cinnamon is used as a flavouring in cinnamon liqueur, such as cinnamon-flavoured whiskey in the United States, and rakomelo, a cinnamon brandy in Greece.

== Health-related research ==
Cinnamon has a long history of use in traditional medicine, including as a digestive aid. However, a survey was unable to find clear contemporary evidence of any significant medicinal or therapeutic effect.

=== Blood sugar and diabetes ===
A 2023 meta-analysis of six meta-analyses found that cinnamon supplementation can lead to modest but significant decreases in fasting plasma glucose and haemoglobin A1C (HbA1c, an indicator of chronically elevated plasma glucose) levels. Older reviews (2012-2019) of clinical trials reported lowering of fasting plasma glucose and inconsistent effects on A1c. Four of the reviews reported a decrease in fasting plasma glucose, only two reported lower HbA1c, and one reported no change to either measure. The 2012 Cochrane review noted that trial durations were limited to 4 to 16 weeks, and that no trials reported on changes to quality of life, morbidity or mortality rate. The Cochrane authors' conclusion was: "There is insufficient evidence to support the use of cinnamon for type 1 or type 2 diabetes mellitus." Citing the Cochrane review, the U.S. National Center for Complementary and Integrative Health stated in 2017: "Studies done in people don't support using cinnamon for any health condition." However, the results of the studies are difficult to interpret because it is often unclear what type of cinnamon and what part of the plant were used.

Another review reported no change to body weight or insulin resistance.

=== Blood lipid levels ===
A 2017 meta-analysis of cinnamon supplementation trials with lipid measurements reported lower total cholesterol and triglycerides, but no significant changes in LDL-cholesterol or HDL-cholesterol.

== Toxicity ==
A systematic review of adverse events as a result of cinnamon use reported gastrointestinal disorders and allergic reactions as the most frequently reported side effects.

=== Coumarin ===
In 2008, the European Food Safety Authority considered the toxicity of coumarin, a component of cinnamon, and confirmed a maximum recommended tolerable daily intake (TDI) of 0.1 mg of coumarin per kg of body weight. Coumarin is known to cause liver and kidney damage in high concentrations and metabolic effects in humans with CYP2A6 polymorphism. Based on this assessment, the European Union set a guideline for maximum coumarin content in foodstuffs of 50 mg per kg of dough in seasonal foods, and 15 mg per kg in everyday baked foods.

	C. cassia		C. verum	
	Min	Max	Min	Max
mg coumarin/g cinnamon	0.09	12 (He et al., 2005)	0.007	0.9
TDI cinnamon at 50 kg body weight (bw)	59 g	0.4 g	714 g	6 g

Due to the variable amount of coumarin in C. cassia, usually well over 1 mg of coumarin per g of cinnamon and sometimes up to 12 times that, C. cassia has a low safe-intake-level upper limit to adhere to the above TDI. In contrast, C. verum has only trace amounts of coumarin.

=== Lead adulteration ===
In March 2024, the US Food and Drug Administration recommended a voluntary recall on six brands of cinnamon apple sauce due to extreme contamination with lead, after an investigation stemming from 500 reports of child lead poisoning across the US. The FDA determined that cinnamon (in apple sauce pouches manufactured by AUSTROFOOD S.A.S. with cinnamon from Negasmart, both of Ecuador) was adulterated with lead chromate. The two suppliers are now Red Listed to forestall future adulteration.

== Gallery ==
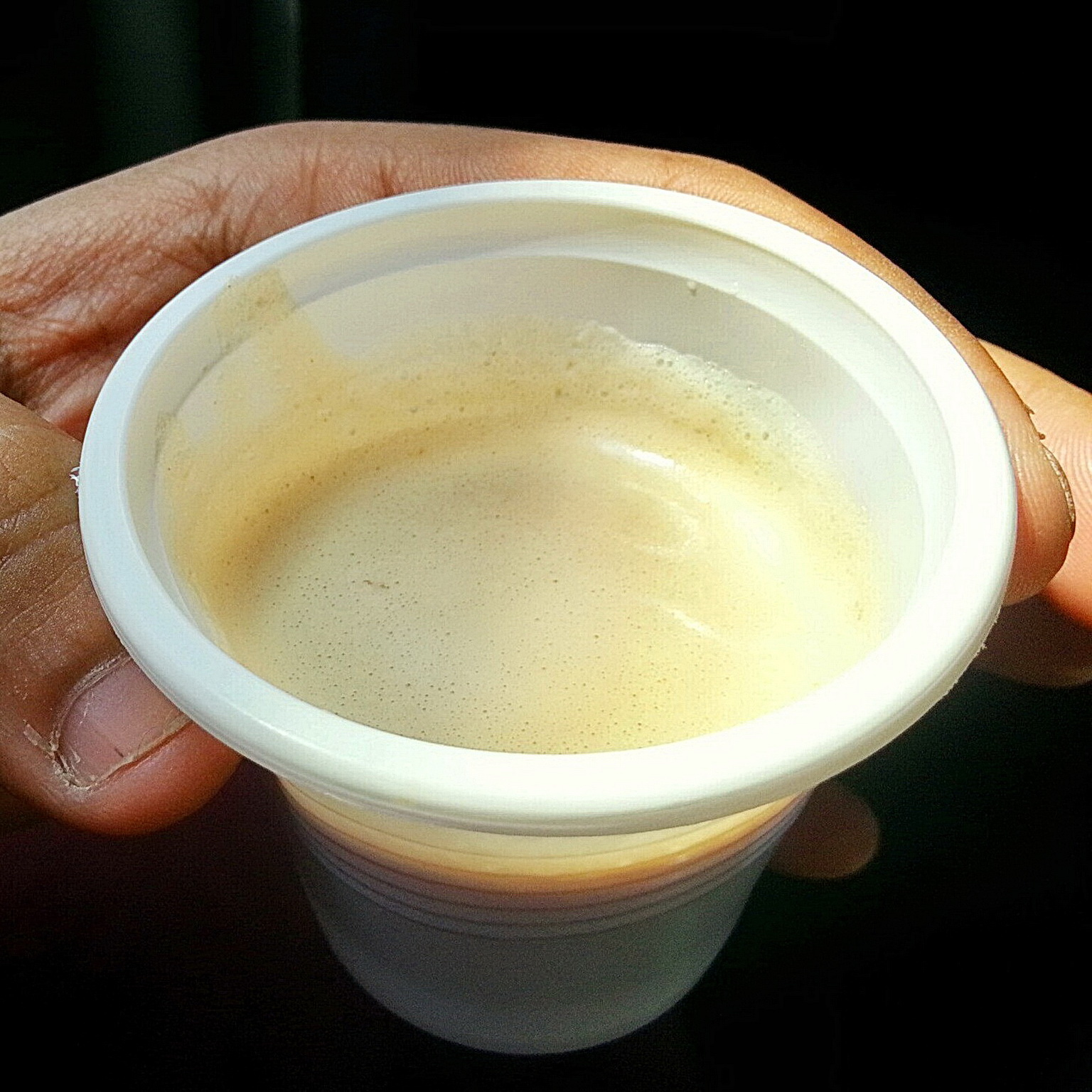
Cinnamon-flavoured tea

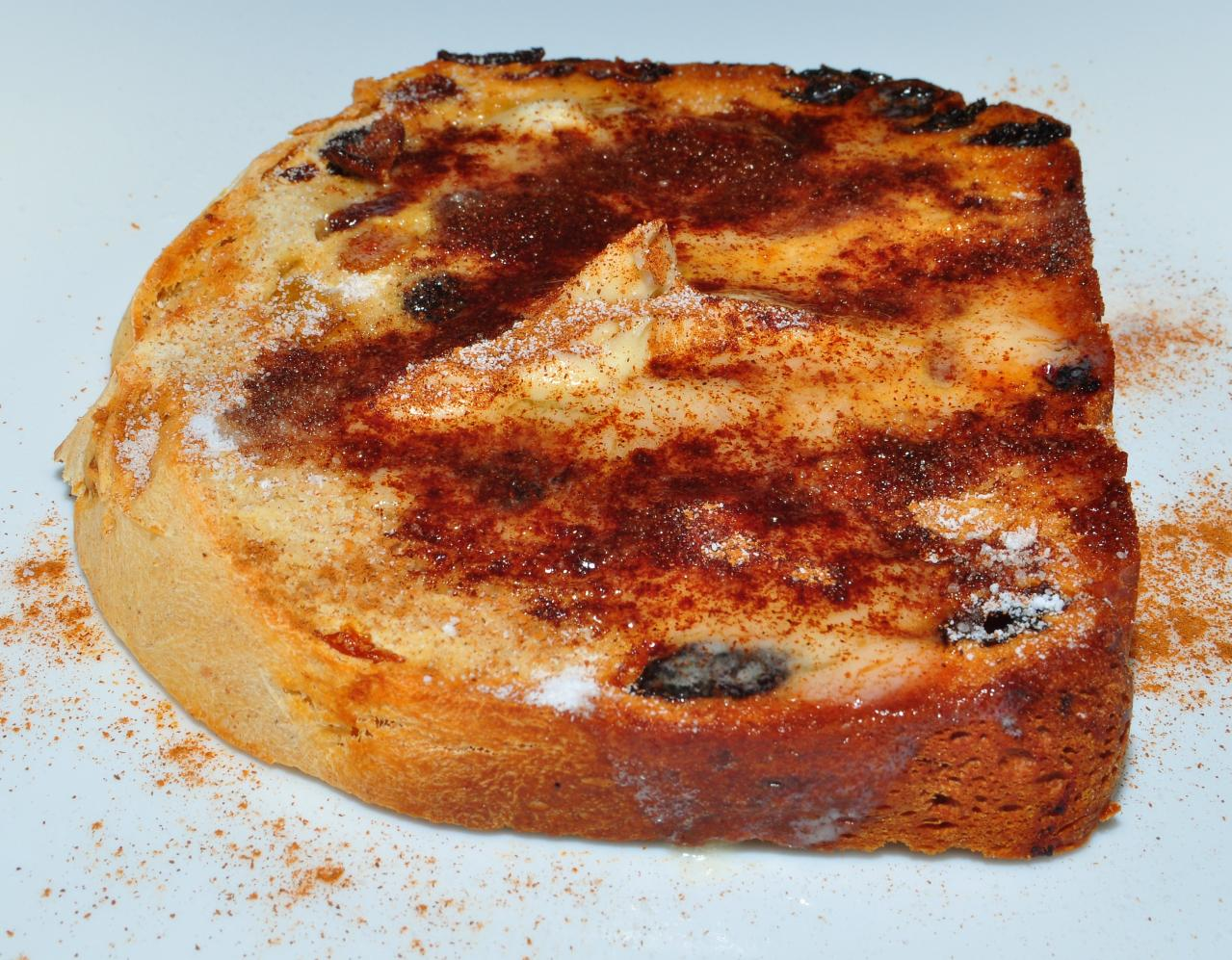
Cinnamon toast can be made with cinnamon baked in, or just sprinkled on top.

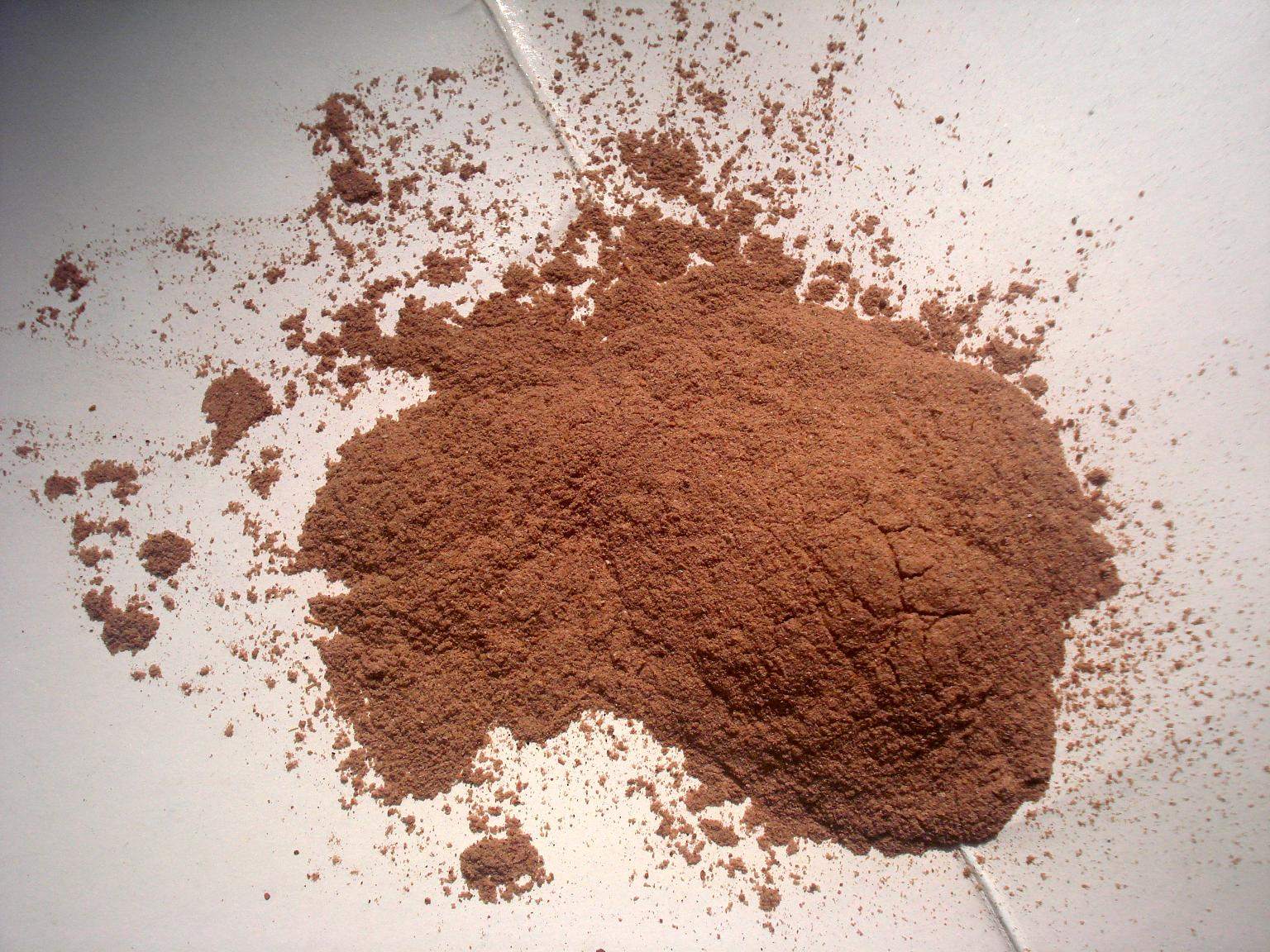
Ground cinnamon

== See also ==
- Canella, a plant known as "wild cinnamon" or "white cinnamon"
- Cinnamomea, a Neo-Latin adjective meaning 'cinnamon-coloured'
- Cinnamon challenge
- List of culinary herbs and spices
