= Rakomelo =

Greek alcoholic drink

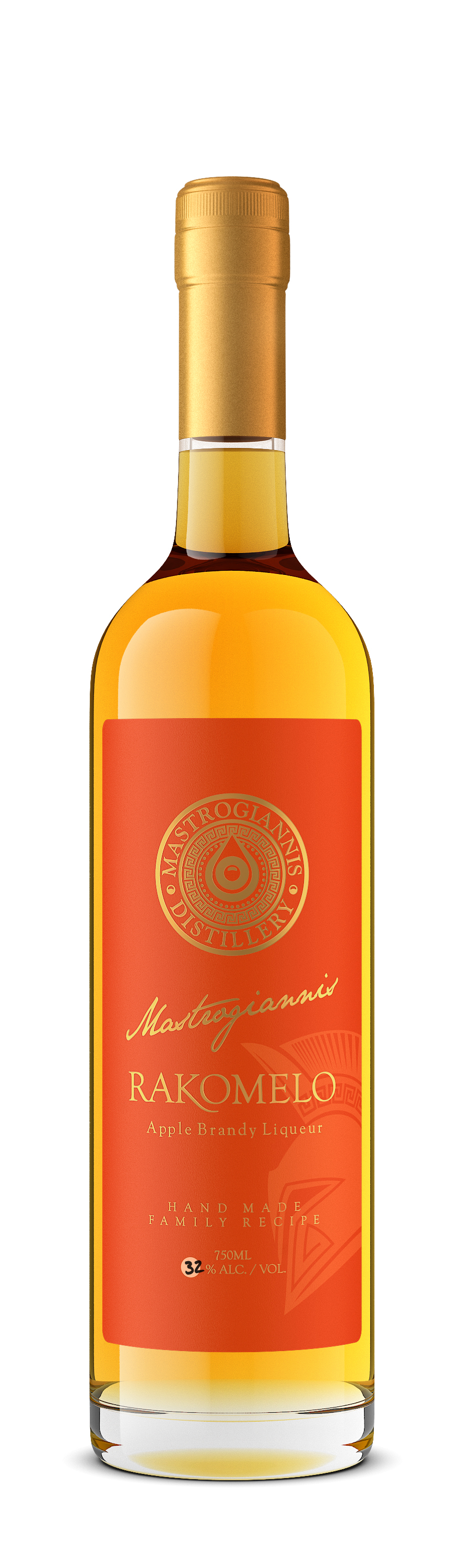
- Mastrogiannis Rakomelo
- Type: Mixed alcoholic drink
- Origin: Greece
- Ingredients: Raki or tsipouro, honey, and spices
- Related products: Baked raki, medovacha

Rakomelo (Greek: ρακόμελο (or racomelo, from raki (ρακή) + meli (μέλι), meaning "honey") is a Greek mixed alcoholic drink. It is a digestive spirit, traditionally used by many Greeks as a home remedy for a sore throat or cough.

== Types ==
Rakomelo is made by combining raki or tsipouro - two types of grape pomace brandy - with honey and several spices, such as cinnamon, cardamom, or other regional herbs. It is produced in Crete and other islands of the Aegean Sea and on the Greek mainland, chiefly consumed during the winter as a warm drink. Rakomelo can be found as a bottled mixed drink in liquor stores, ready to be served.

A similar drink is baked raki, which is a regional drink of the island of Amorgos, known as psimeni, made from raki, sugar and spices, and served at room temperature. Baked raki contains more spices than rakomelo, which usually only contains cinnamon. Baked raki is also available mixed and bottled, ready for consumption (served at room temperature).

== Composition ==
A general recipe for rakomelo is 1–2 teaspoons of honey for every 4 shots of raki, along with one clove and about 1 teaspoon of cinnamon, modified to suit different tastes.
