= Cinnamomum citriodorum =

Conservation status
- Endangered (IUCN 3.1)

Scientific classification
- Kingdom: Plantae
- Clade: Tracheophytes
- Clade: Angiosperms
- Clade: Magnoliids
- Order: Laurales
- Family: Lauraceae
- Genus: Cinnamomum
- Species: C. citriodorum

Binomial name
- Cinnamomum citriodorum Thwaites (1861)

Synonyms
- Camphora citriodora (Thwaites) Lukman. (1878)

Species of flowering plant

Cinnamomum citriodorum is a species of flowering plant in the family Lauraceae. It is commonly known as Malabar cinnamon. It is an evergreen tree which grows up to 10 metres tall. The species is endemic to central and southwestern Sri Lanka.

It grows in lowland rain forests from 300 to 700 metres elevation. It is a rare tree, known from only five wild populations. It is threatened by habitat loss from conversion of its native forests to agriculture and plantations.

It has a characteristic smell of lemon grass. C. citriodorum has 45% cinnamaldehyde compared to 80% for C. cassia.
