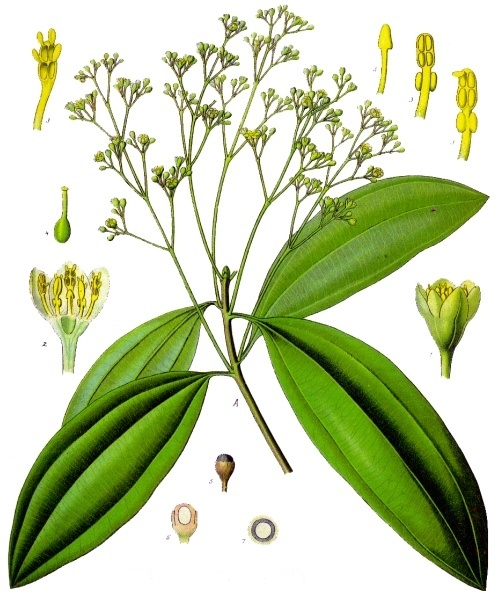
- From Koehler's Medicinal-Plants (1887)

Scientific classification
- Kingdom: Plantae
- Clade: Tracheophytes
- Clade: Angiosperms
- Clade: Magnoliids
- Order: Laurales
- Family: Lauraceae
- Genus: Cinnamomum
- Species: C. cassia

Binomial name
- Cinnamomum cassia (L.) J.Presl

Synonyms
- Camphorina cassia (L.) Farw.; Cinnamomum aromaticum Nees; Cinnamomum longifolium Lukman.; Cinnamomum medium Lukman.; Cinnamomum nitidum Hook. nom. illeg.; Laurus cassia L.; Persea cassia (L.) Spreng.

= Cinnamomum cassia =

Species of tree

Cinnamomum cassia, called Chinese cassia, cassia cinnamon, or Chinese cinnamon, is an evergreen tree originating in southern China and widely cultivated there and elsewhere in South and Southeast Asia. It is one of several species of Cinnamomum used primarily for its aromatic bark, which is used as a spice. The buds are also used as a spice, especially in India, and were used by the ancient Romans.

== Taxonomy and nomenclature ==
The nomenclature of Chinese cassia has a complicated history. Linnaeus described Laurus cassia in 1753, but the original material associated with the name included more than one species. A second-step lectotypification by Chakrabarty in 2018 fixed the application of Laurus cassia to a species now treated as Neolitsea cassia.

In 1825, J.Presl published the combination Cinnamomum cassia (L.) J.Presl, based on Linnaeus's Laurus cassia; D. Don also published the combination Cinnamomum cassia (L.) D.Don based on the same Linnaean name. Because these names are based on the type of Laurus cassia, they are nomenclaturally associated with the taxon now treated as Neolitsea cassia, rather than with Chinese cassia.

A different name, Cinnamomum cassia Nees ex Blume, was published by Blume in 1826 and has traditionally been applied to Chinese cassia. Because the name Cinnamomum cassia had already been used for the combinations based on Laurus cassia, Blume's name is an illegitimate later homonym. In the absence of nomenclatural conservation, the earliest available legitimate name for Chinese cassia is Cinnamomum aromaticum Nees, published in 1831.

In 2025, Külkamp and colleagues proposed conserving Cinnamomum cassia Nees ex Blume against the earlier homonyms C. cassia (L.) J.Presl and C. cassia (L.) D.Don, citing the widespread scientific, commercial and medicinal use of the name C. cassia. The proposal remains subject to a decision under the International Code of Nomenclature.

As of August 2026, Plants of the World Online accepts Cinnamomum aromaticum as a species. It separately treats Cinnamomum cassia Nees ex Blume as an illegitimate name and a synonym of Cinnamomum burmanni.

== Description ==
The tree grows to 10–15 m (33–49 ft) tall, with greyish bark and hard, elongated leaves that are 10–15 cm (3.9–5.9 in) long and reddish when young.

== Origin and types ==
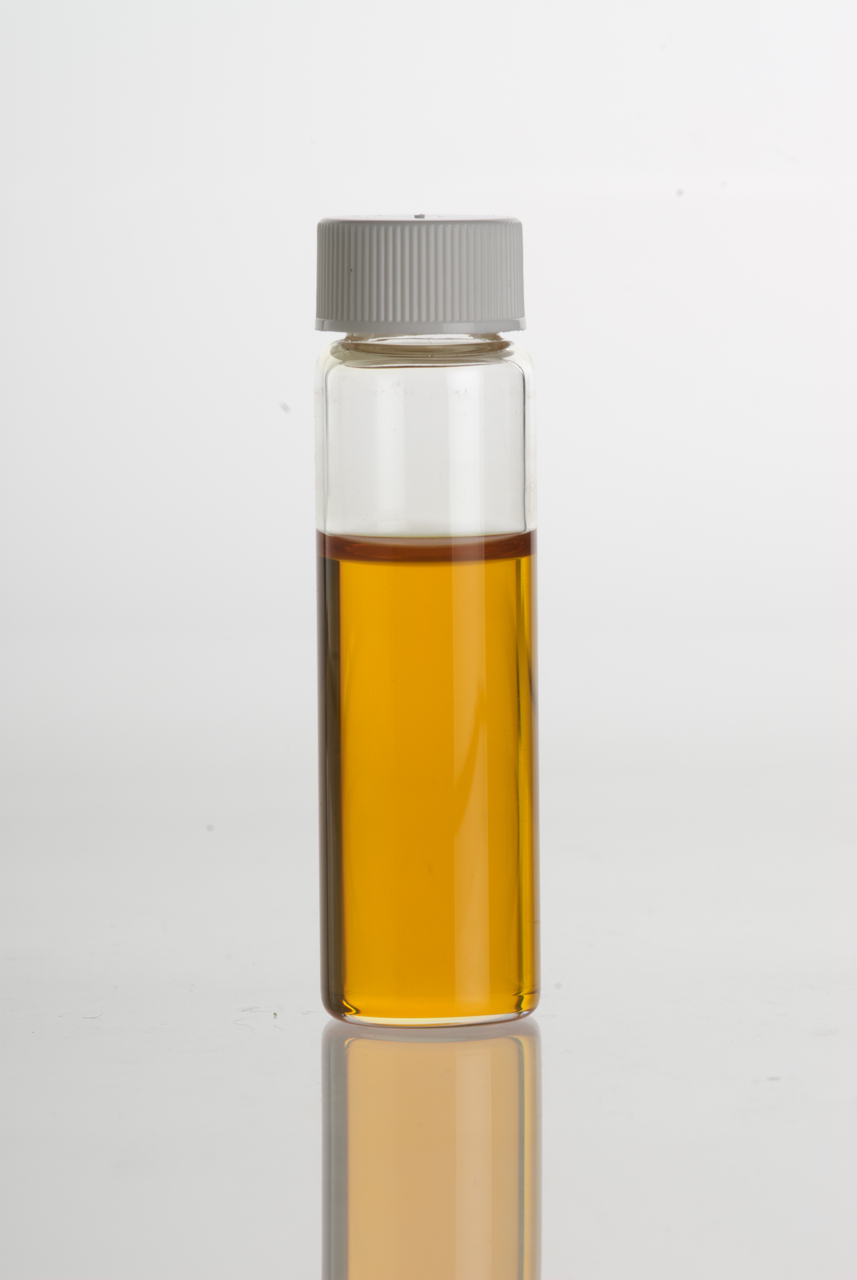
Cassia (C. cassia) essential oil

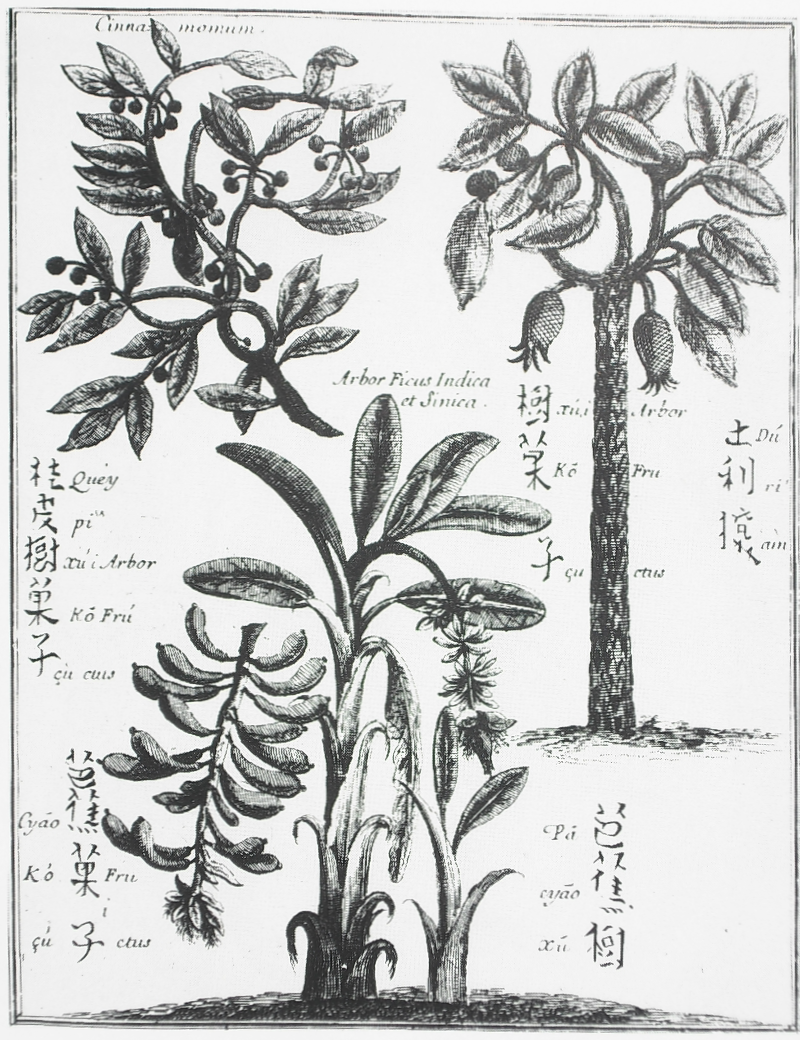
C. cassia (top left) depicted by Michał Boym (1655)

Chinese cassia is a close relative to Ceylon cinnamon (C. verum), Saigon cinnamon (C. loureiroi), Indonesian cinnamon (C. burmanni), and Malabar cinnamon (C. citriodorum). In all five species, the dried bark is used as a spice. The flavour of Chinese cassia is less delicate than that of Ceylon cinnamon. Its bark is thicker, more difficult to crush, and has a rougher texture than that of Ceylon cinnamon. Cassia cinnamon is the most popular variety of cinnamon sold and consumed in North America.

Chinese cassia is produced in both China and Vietnam. Until the 1960s, Vietnam was the world's most important producer of Saigon cinnamon, which has a higher oil content, and consequently has a stronger flavour. Because of the disruption caused by the Vietnam War, however, production of Indonesian cassia in the highlands of the Indonesian island of Sumatra was increased to meet demand. Indonesian cassia has the lowest oil content of the three types of cassia, so commands the lowest price. Chinese cassia has a sweeter flavour than Indonesian cassia, similar to Saigon cinnamon, but with lower oil content.

== Uses ==
=== Spice ===
Cassia bark (both powdered and in whole or "stick" form) is used as a flavouring agent for confectionery, desserts, pastries, and meat; it is specified in many curry recipes, where Ceylon cinnamon is less suitable. Traditionally, the bark is stripped off the tree and dried in the shade. After drying, it is thinly sliced for use or ground into a powder. Essential oils made from the stripped bark have many uses, such as in health products, food and drinks. Cassia is sometimes added to Ceylon cinnamon but is a much thicker, coarser product. Cassia is sold as pieces of bark or as neat quills or sticks. Cassia sticks can be distinguished from Ceylon cinnamon sticks in this manner: Ceylon cinnamon sticks have many thin layers and can easily be made into powder using a coffee or spice grinder, whereas cassia sticks are extremely hard and are usually made up of one thick layer.

Cassia buds, although rare, are also occasionally used as a spice. They resemble cloves in appearance and have a mild, flowery cinnamon flavour. Cassia buds are primarily used in old-fashioned pickling recipes, marinades, and teas.

=== Traditional medicine and phytochemicals ===
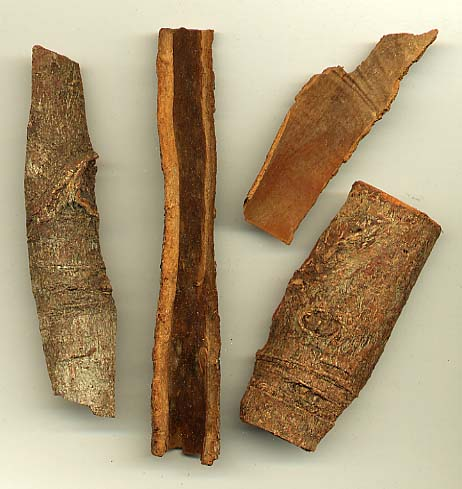
Dried cassia bark

The part of the bark that is used to make spices is called the Cinnamomi cortex. Chinese cassia (called ròuguì; 肉桂 in Chinese) is produced primarily in the southern provinces of Guangxi, Guangdong, and Yunnan. It is considered one of the 50 fundamental herbs in traditional Chinese medicine. More than 160 phytochemicals have been isolated from Cinnamomum cassia.

Coumarin found in C. cassia could damage the liver if consumed in larger amounts, therefore European health agencies have warned against consuming high amounts of cassia. (Coumarin is not influencing blood coagulation, but Dicoumarol, formed from Coumarin, does.) Other bioactive compounds found in the bark, powder and essential oils of C. cassia are cinnamaldehyde and styrene. In high doses, these substances can also be toxic to humans.

== History ==
A mention by Chinese herbalists suggests that cassia bark was used by humans at least as far back as 2700 B.C. It was a treatment for diarrhea, fevers, and menstrual issues.

Cassia cinnamon was brought to Egypt around 500 B.C. where it became a valued additive to their embalming mixtures. The Bible suggests that it was part of the anointing oil used by Moses. The Greeks, Romans and ancient Hebrews were the first to use cassia bark as a cooking spice. They also made perfumes with it and used it for medicinal purposes. Cinnamon migrated with the Romans. It was established for culinary use by the 17th century in Europe.

== See also ==
- Chinese herbology
- Neolitsea cassia (Sri Lankan Cinnamon, dawulu kurundu, kudu dawula)
- Cinnamomum burmanni (Indonesian cinnamon, Padang cassia, Batavia cassia, korintje)
- Cinnamomum tamala (malabathrum, Indian bay leaf)
