= Los Angeles International Competitions =

Event focused on alcohol and olive oil

- Genre: Food and beverage competitions
- Frequency: Annual
- Location: Fairplex
- Years active: 74
- Website: http://www.lawinecomp.com

The Los Angeles International Competitions event focuses on the wine, spirits, beer and olive oil industries. Distributors and makers in each industry submit entries to be judged by a panel of experts.

== History ==
The competitive event got its start shortly after the repeal of Prohibition in the late 1930s and is one of the longest running of its kind. Originally known as the Los Angeles International Wine & Spirits Competition, the event now includes entries in the categories of wine, spirits, beer and extra virgin olive oil. The competition was created as part of the L.A. County Fair. Local guests could submit their wines and receive medals for their entries. The competition began accepting entries from other parts of the nation and allowed international submissions in 2002. The competition now runs separately from the L.A. County Fair, although award-winning submissions are featured for the duration of the Fair.

== Competitions ==
Wine, spirits, commercial beer and extra virgin olive oil are the four individual categories in the international competitions.

The wine competition receives the most submissions. Categories include champagne, bordeaux, dessert wines, organic wines and others that are typical to similar events. Wine submissions are judged by a panel of 75 wine experts using a blind-tasting method. The wine competition is also the foundation for the wine education program at the L.A. County Fair.

The spirits competition was introduced in correlation with the wine competition in 2007. During the inaugural event, entries were limited to Blue Agave Tequilas. The competition was opened to all spirits and mixers in 2010. The judging panel consists of pub and bar owners, distillers and journalists with experience in the field.

The extra virgin olive oil category was added in 2002. The competition is open to international entries with oils coming from Italy, Spain, Portugal, Argentina and France. Currently the competition consists of two parts. The Northern Hemisphere Competition invites entries from Croatia, Greece, Israel, Italy, Japan, Lebanon, Mexico, Morocco, Palestine, Portugal, Slovenia, Spain, Tunisia, Turkey and the United States. The Southern Hemisphere Competition includes entries from Argentina, Australia, Chile, New Zealand, Peru, South Africa and Uruguay. The competition was originally created to improve the breed of California extra virgin olive oils

There are three categories in the competition: delicate, medium and robust. A number of awards are given at the end of the competition including 6 Best of Show awards. One domestic and one international Best of Show award is given per category.

The beer component was introduced in 2000 and falls under the same blind-tasting method as the other competitions. The competition is the least popular of the event but also hosts international and domestic entries annually.

== Awards ==
Awards are handed out in the form of gold, silver and bronze medals. In order to receive a gold medal, an entry needs a minimum of 90 points. Entries are judged based on the character and style of the wine using elements such as taste, texture and quality of ingredients. In addition to medals, a Best of Show and Best of Division are given per category in each competition. An award for best packaging design is also part of the competition.

== See also ==
- Wine competition
- Olive oil
