= Cinnamomum lawang =

Conservation status
- Vulnerable (IUCN 3.1)

Scientific classification
- Kingdom: Plantae
- Clade: Tracheophytes
- Clade: Angiosperms
- Clade: Magnoliids
- Order: Laurales
- Family: Lauraceae
- Genus: Cinnamomum
- Species: C. lawang

Binomial name
- Cinnamomum lawang Kosterm.

Species of tree

Cinnamomum lawang is a species of tree in the laurel family (Lauraceae). It is endemic to Borneo.

== Description ==
Cinnamomum lawang is a tree growing to 27 m tall, with a trunk 72 cm in diameter. It shares the same type of enlarged fleshy fruit cupule with Cinnamomum crassinervium, but differs in having distinctly stout and quadrangular apical twigs (vs. less angular), 4-locular stamens (vs. 2-locular), cupule perianth lobes not plicate (vs. plicate), and fruit pedicel terete in cross-section (vs. triangular).

== Range and habitat ==
Cinnamomum lawang is found in Sarawak (Sri Aman District) and West Kalimantan. It grows in lowland rain forest.
