= Cinnamomum kinabaluense =

Conservation status
- Endangered (IUCN 3.1)

Scientific classification
- Kingdom: Plantae
- Clade: Tracheophytes
- Clade: Angiosperms
- Clade: Magnoliids
- Order: Laurales
- Family: Lauraceae
- Genus: Cinnamomum
- Species: C. kinabaluense

Binomial name
- Cinnamomum kinabaluense Heine

Species of plant

Cinnamomum kinabaluense is a species of plant in the laurel family (Lauraceae). It is endemic to Borneo.

== Description ==
Cinnamomum kinabaluense is a small tree or shrub, growing 2 to 3 m tall. It resembles Cinnamomum angustitepalum, but differs in having a cupule with caducous perianth lobes (vs persistent), indumentum yellowish upon drying (vs reddish upon drying), and 2-locular anthers (vs 4-locular).

== Range and habitat ==
It is found in Sabah (Ranau and Tambunan districts) and Sarawak (Julau district). It grows in lower montane rain forest above 1200 metres elevation.
