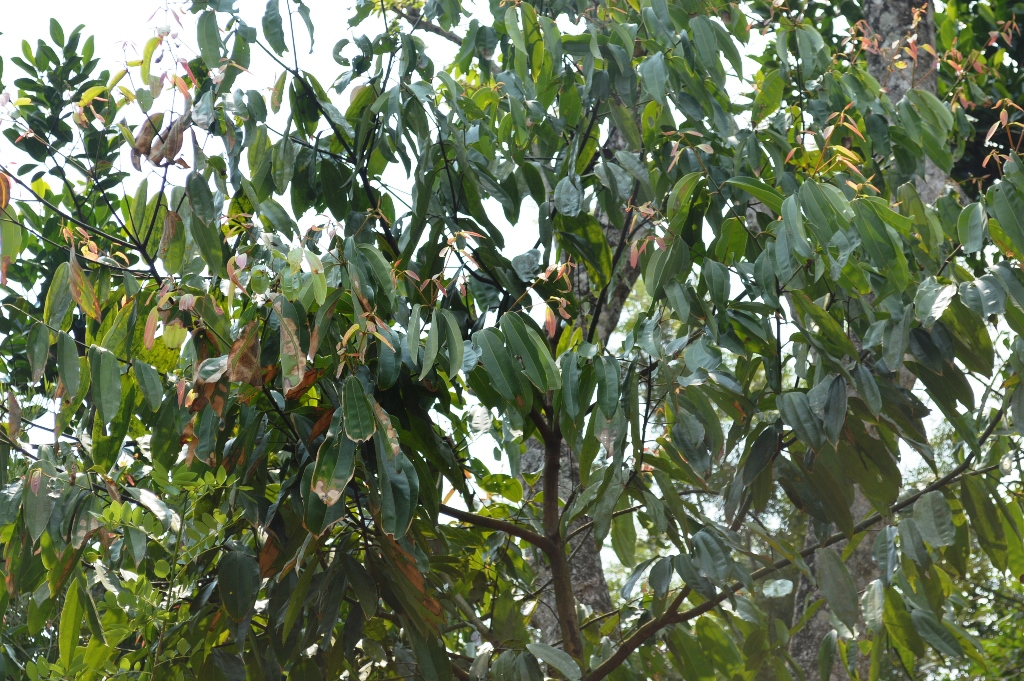

Conservation status
- Least Concern (IUCN 3.1)

Scientific classification
- Kingdom: Plantae
- Clade: Tracheophytes
- Clade: Angiosperms
- Clade: Magnoliids
- Order: Laurales
- Family: Lauraceae
- Genus: Cinnamomum
- Species: C. malabatrum

Binomial name
- Cinnamomum malabatrum (Burm.f.) J.Presl

Synonyms
- Camphora wrightii var. multinervia Lukman.; Cinnamomum malabathricum (Roxb.) Lukman.; Cinnamomum malabathricum var. rheedii Lukman.; Cinnamomum malabathricum var. smithii Lukman.; Cinnamomum malabathricum var. wrightii Lukman.; Cinnamomum nicolsonianum Manilal & Shylaja; Cinnamomum ochraceum Blume; Cinnamomum rheedii Lukman.; Laurus malabathrica Roxb.; Laurus malabatrum Burm.f.

= Cinnamomum malabatrum =

Species of flowering plant

Cinnamomum malabatrum, wild cinnamon, country cinnamon also known as malabathrum, is a tree in the family Lauraceae that is endemic to Western Ghats of India. It can grow up to 15 m (49 ft) tall. It has aromatic leaves that are used for culinary and medicinal purposes. It is thought to have been one of the major sources of the medicinal plant leaves known in classic and medieval times as malabathrum (or malobathrum). It is locally known as Edana, Therali or Vazhana in Kerala.

== Uses ==
The bark is sometimes used for cooking, although it is regarded as inferior to true cinnamon or cassia. Thorough macroscopic and microscopic investigations revealed that Cinnamomum malabatrum is mixed with Cinnamomum tamala as an adulterant in 'Tamalapatra', a highly reputed commodity in drug and spice trade. It is often used in kumbilappam or chakka-ada, an authentic sweet from Kerala, infusing its characteristic flavor to the dumplings.

== Etymology ==
Malabar had been traditionally used to denote the west coast of Southern India that forms the present-day state of Kerala and adjoining areas. The word mala or malaya means "mountain" in the Tamil and Malayalam languages, as also in Sanskrit. The word "malabathrum" is thought to have been derived from the Sanskrit tamālapattram (तमालपत्त्रम्), literally meaning "dark-tree leaves".

== Related species ==
- Cassia
- Cinnamomum verum
- Cinnamomum tamala
- Cinnamon
- Saigon cinnamon
