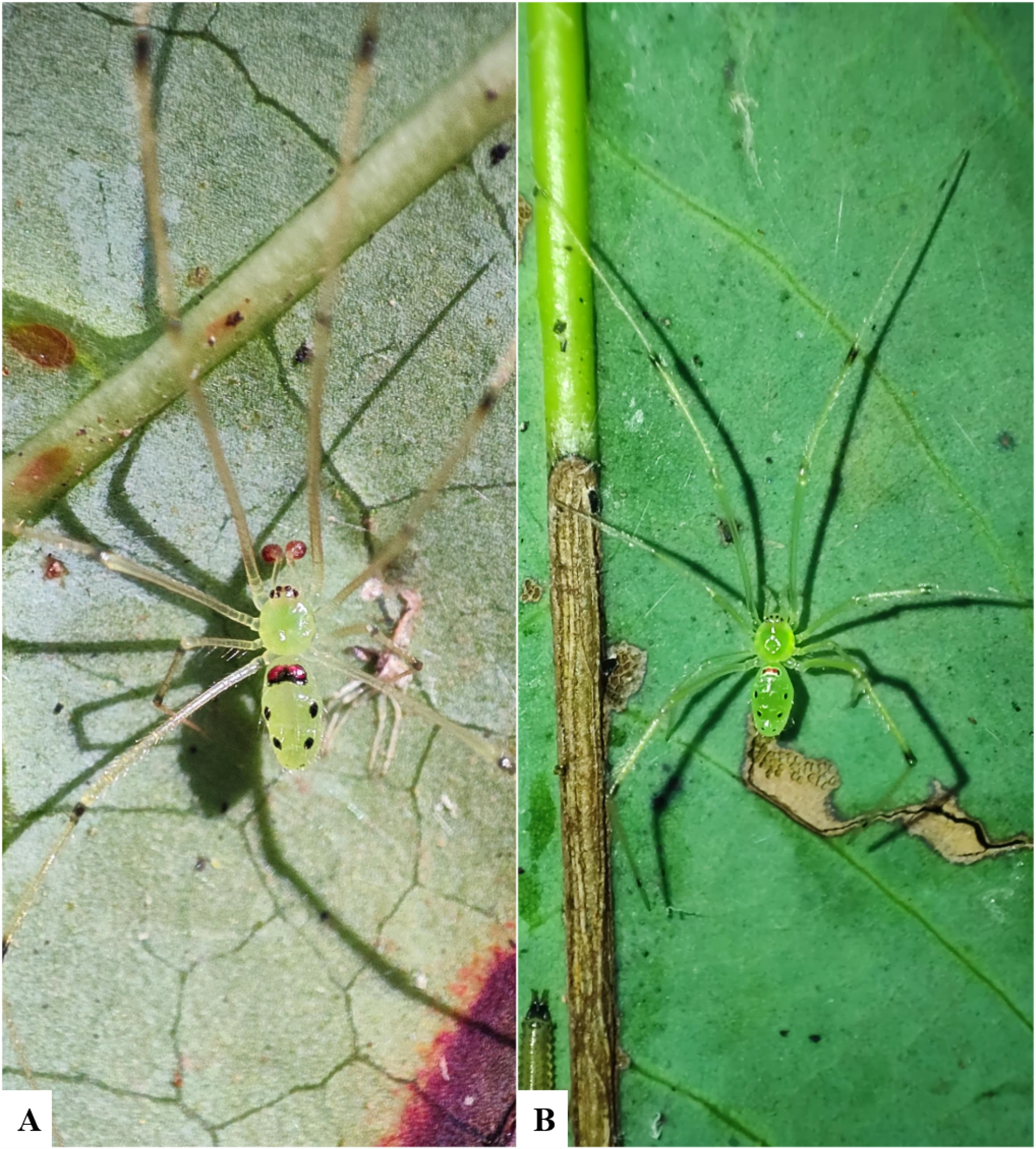
- Habitus of male and female

Scientific classification
- Kingdom: Animalia
- Phylum: Arthropoda
- Subphylum: Chelicerata
- Class: Arachnida
- Order: Araneae
- Infraorder: Araneomorphae
- Family: Theridiidae
- Genus: Theridion
- Species: T. himalayanum

Binomial name
- Theridion himalayanum Priyadarshini & Tripathy, 2026

= Theridion himalayanum =

Species of spider

Theridion himalayanum is a species of tangle-web spiders.

== Range ==
Only known from the type locality in Uttarakhand, India.

== Habitat ==
The species is found in the Himalayan moist temperate deciduous forests, and have been found resting on the abaxial side of large, broad-shaped leaves of certain plants, such as Daphniphyllum himalense, Machilus, Cinnamomum tamala and Hedychium.

== Etymology ==
The specific epithet 'himalayana' was originally assigned to species reflecting the general collection locality, as an ode to the mighty Himalayan Mountain range that holds a wealth of biodiversity. In the subsequent World Spider Catalog (Version 27) it is revised as Theridion himalayanum Tripathy & Priyadarshini, 2026. The spelling of the Latin adjectival suffix was altered as a mandatory correction with a neuter inflection, so becoming -anum (in the nominative singular). This was revised to reflect the grammatically neuter genus.
