= Malabathrum =

Spice plant native to India

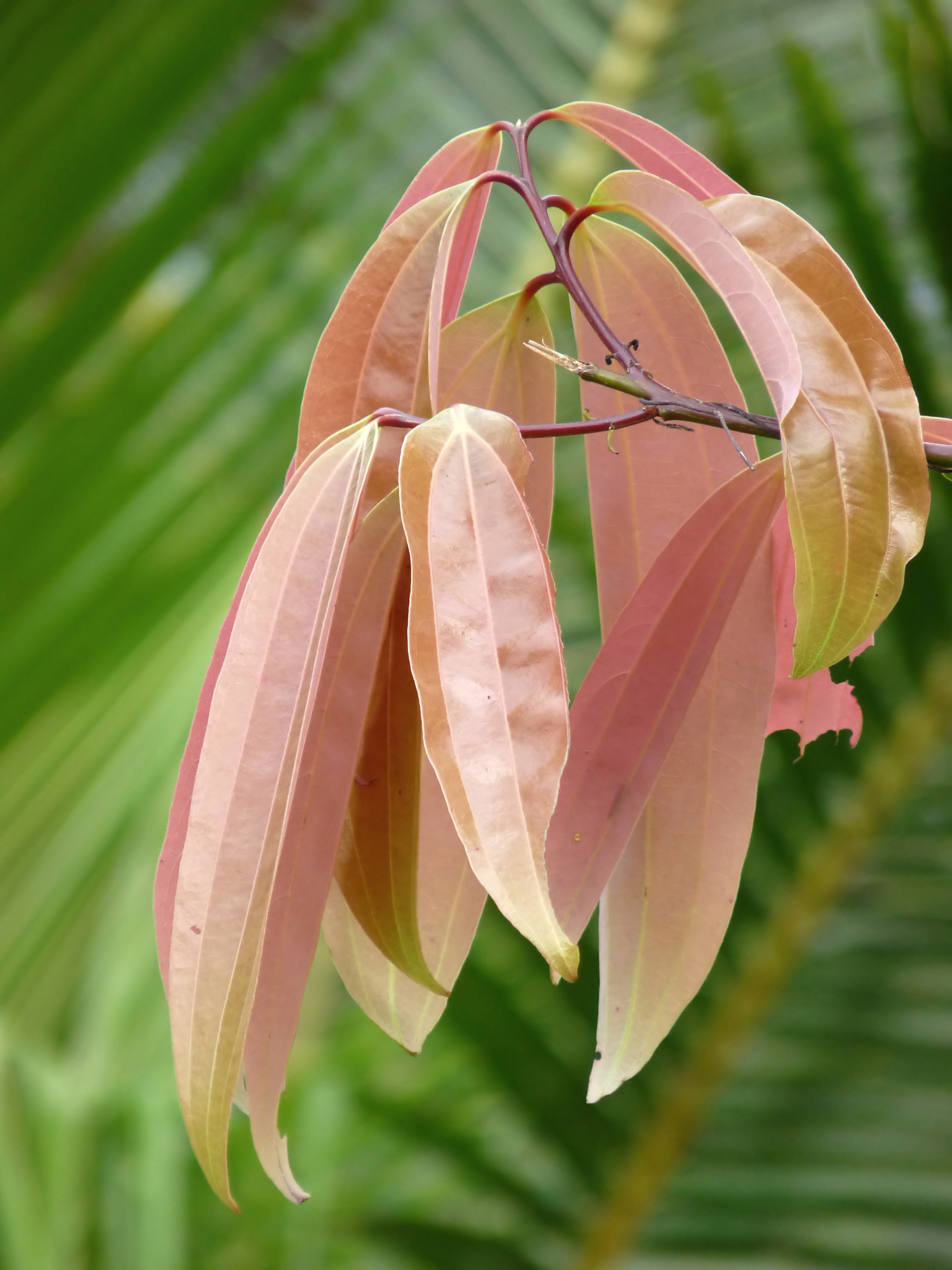
Cinnamomum malabatrum, young leaves, Kerala, India

Malabathrum, malabathron (Ancient Greek: μαλάβαθρον), or malobathrum is the name used in classical and medieval texts for certain cinnamon-like aromatic plant leaves and an ointment prepared from those leaves. Cinnamomum tamala (sometimes given as Cinnamomum tejpata), grown most commonly in the eastern Himalayas, but also in the Western Ghats, is thought to be a notable source of these leaves, although other species of Cinnamomum and even plants in other genera may have been used. In ancient Greece and Rome, the leaves were used to prepare a fragrant oil, called oleum malabathri, and were therefore valuable.

== History ==
Malabathrum is mentioned in the first century Greek text Periplus Maris Erythraei and sourced to a people called 'Sêsatai', identified with Kirradai (Kirata) of Ptolemy. Though malabathrum was a product of Northeast India, it was rarely traded by the western traders at the mouth of the Ganges (which is much closer to the source) but at southwestern Indian ports of Muziris/Nelcynda. It is mentioned in the Periplus that some people collected the green leaves after the Sêsatai in the northeast prepared them and carried them to the ports of trade. In the language of Kerala, Malayalam, the plant is called vazhana. It is also known as edana in Malayalam. The name malabathrum is used in mediaeval texts to describe the dried leaves of a number of trees of the genus Cinnamomum, which were thought to have medicinal properties.

The Greeks used kásia (cassia) or malabathron to flavour wine, with absinth wormwood (Artemisia absinthium). De Re Coquinaria, a cookbook sometimes attributed to the Roman gourmet Marcus Gavius Apicius, uses malabathrum leaves (folia) in several recipes and for distilling an oil used in a caraway-sauce for oysters. Malabathrum is among the spices that, according to De Re Coquinaria, any good kitchen should contain.

Malabathrum from Egypt (Dioscorides I, 63) was based on beef fat and contained cinnamon, as well; one pound cost 300 denarii.

== Etymology ==
The word "malabathrum" is the Hellenization of the Sanskrit word tamālapattram (तमालपत्त्रम्), literally meaning "dark tree leaves", with the ta being mistaken for the Greek definite article.
