= Cinnamomum percoriaceum =

Conservation status
- Endangered (IUCN 3.1)

Scientific classification
- Kingdom: Plantae
- Clade: Tracheophytes
- Clade: Angiosperms
- Clade: Magnoliids
- Order: Laurales
- Family: Lauraceae
- Genus: Cinnamomum
- Species: C. percoriaceum

Binomial name
- Cinnamomum percoriaceum Kosterm.

Species of tree

Cinnamomum percoriaceum is a species of tree in the laurel family (Lauraceae). It is endemic to Borneo. It is a small tree growing to 6 metres tall, with a trunk to 7 cm in diameter.

It is known only from Sarawak (Limbang and Sri Aman districts). It grows in montane rain forest up to 2000 m elevation.
