= Cinnamomum laubatii =

- Botanical ilustration

Conservation status
- Least Concern (IUCN 3.1)

Scientific classification
- Kingdom: Plantae
- Clade: Tracheophytes
- Clade: Angiosperms
- Clade: Magnoliids
- Order: Laurales
- Family: Lauraceae
- Genus: Cinnamomum
- Species: C. laubatii

Binomial name
- Cinnamomum laubatii F.Muell.

Species of flowering plant

Cinnamomum laubatii, commonly known as pepperwood, is a species of plant in the family Lauraceae endemic to Queensland, Australia. It is a tree to 35 m (115 ft) tall and a crown width of about 6 m (20 ft), which inhabits rainforest from Cooktown in the north to about Mackay in the south. Most occurrences are in the highlands west of Port Douglas, Cairns and Mackay, with scattered occurrences between those points.

The tree provides a general purpose hardwood marketed as 'pepperwood' and used for interior panelling, cupboards and furniture, as well as some marine applications.

== Conservation ==
As of September 2025, this species has been assessed to be of least concern by the International Union for Conservation of Nature (IUCN) and by the Queensland Government under its Nature Conservation Act.
