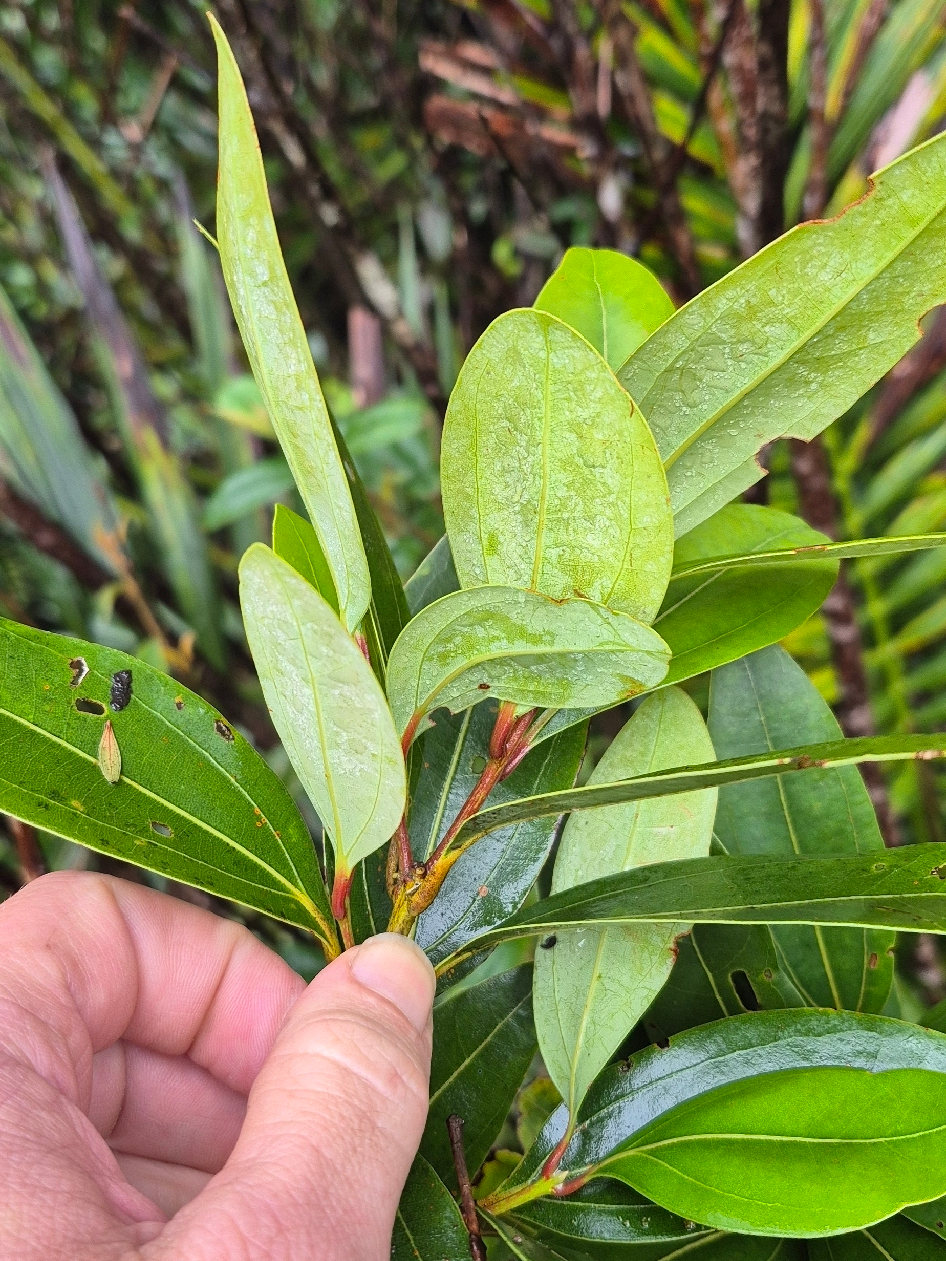

Conservation status
- Critically Endangered (NCA)

Scientific classification
- Kingdom: Plantae
- Clade: Embryophytes
- Clade: Tracheophytes
- Clade: Angiosperms
- Clade: Magnoliids
- Order: Laurales
- Family: Lauraceae
- Genus: Cinnamomum
- Species: C. propinquum

Binomial name
- Cinnamomum propinquum F.M.Bailey
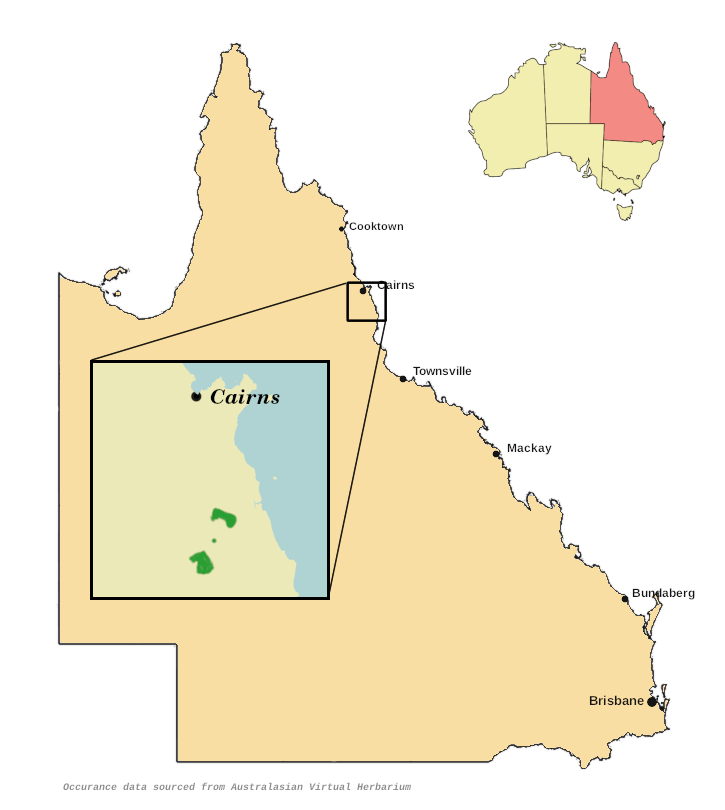

= Cinnamomum propinquum =

Species of flowering plant

Cinnamomum propinquum, commonly known as pepperwood, is a species of plant in the family Lauraceae native to the Wet Tropics bioregion of Queensland, Australia. It is a rainforest tree, first described in 1901, and is critically endangered, being found only on the highest peaks of the region.

== Description ==
Cinnamomum propinquum is a tree growing to a height of 12 m (39 ft). The twigs give off a peppery odour when broken, giving rise to the common name. The leaves are arranged in opposite pairs and measure up to 10 cm (3.9 in) long and 4 cm (1.6 in) wide. The lower side of the leaf blade is glaucous. The inflorescence is a panicle about the same length as the leaves. The fragrant flowers have six green to cream tepals measuring up to 5 mm (0.20 in) long. The fruit is a dark blue to purple drupe about 14 mm (0.6 in) long and 12 mm (0.5 in) wide. It contains one brown seed about 9 mm (0.4 in) long.

== Distribution and habitat ==
This is a rare species that grows in rainforest above about 700 m (2,300 ft) on Mount Bellenden Ker and Mount Bartle Frere. Both peaks are in the Wooroonooran National Park about 40–50 km (25–31 mi) south of Cairns.

== Conservation ==
This species is listed as critically endangered in the Queensland Government's Wildnet database. As of 1 September 2026, it has not been assessed by the International Union for Conservation of Nature.

== Gallery ==
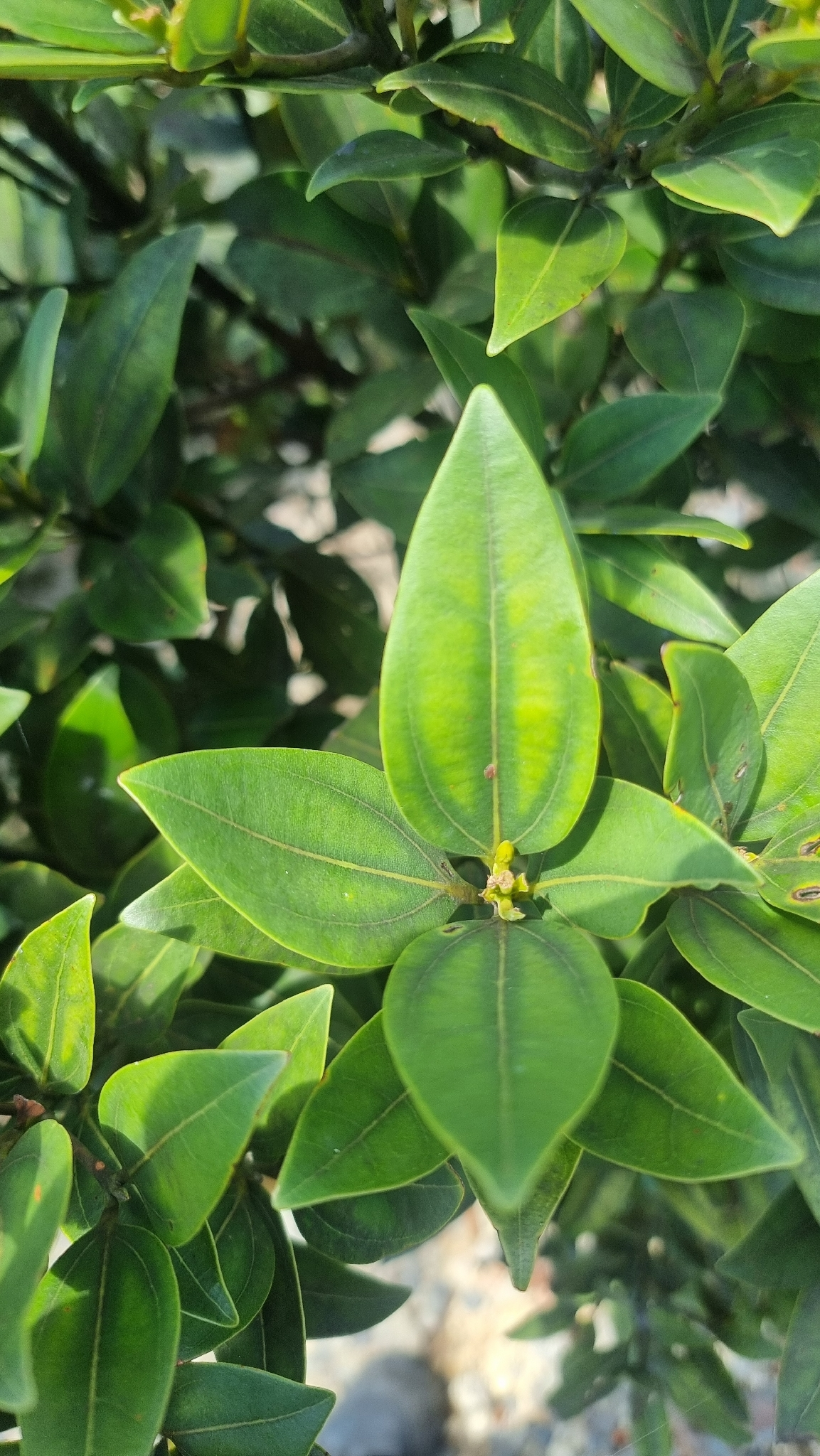
Foliage

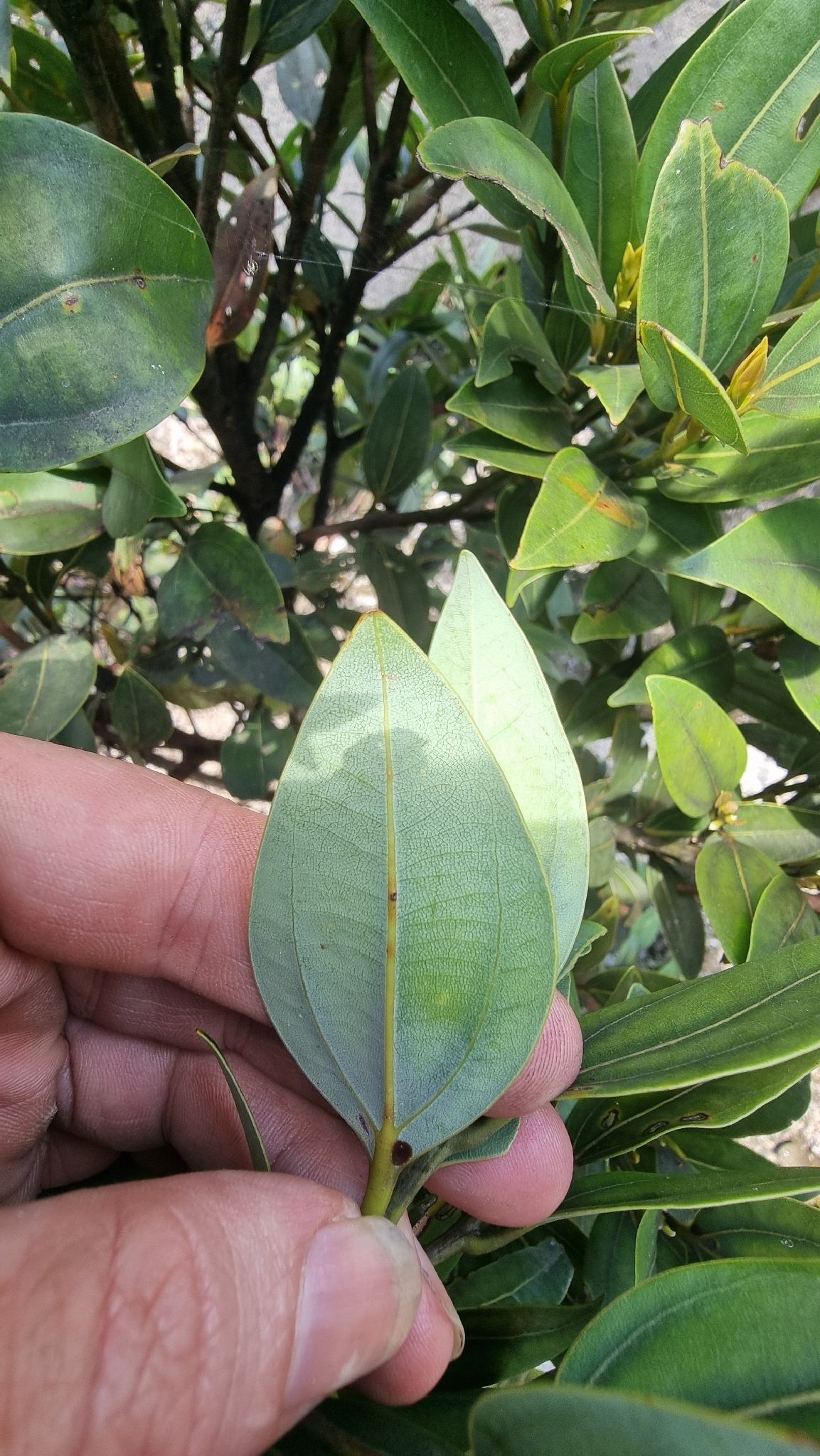
Glaucous underside of leaf

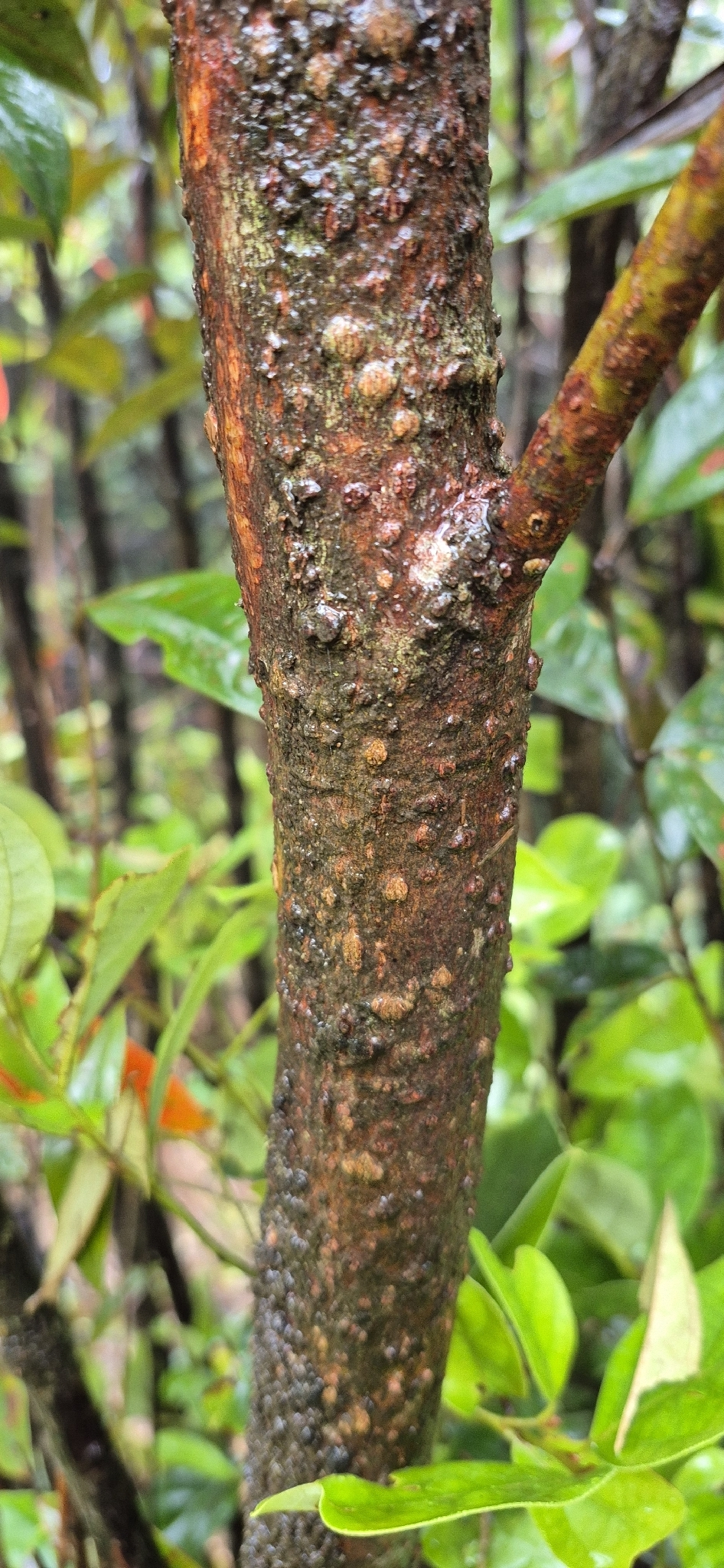
Trunk

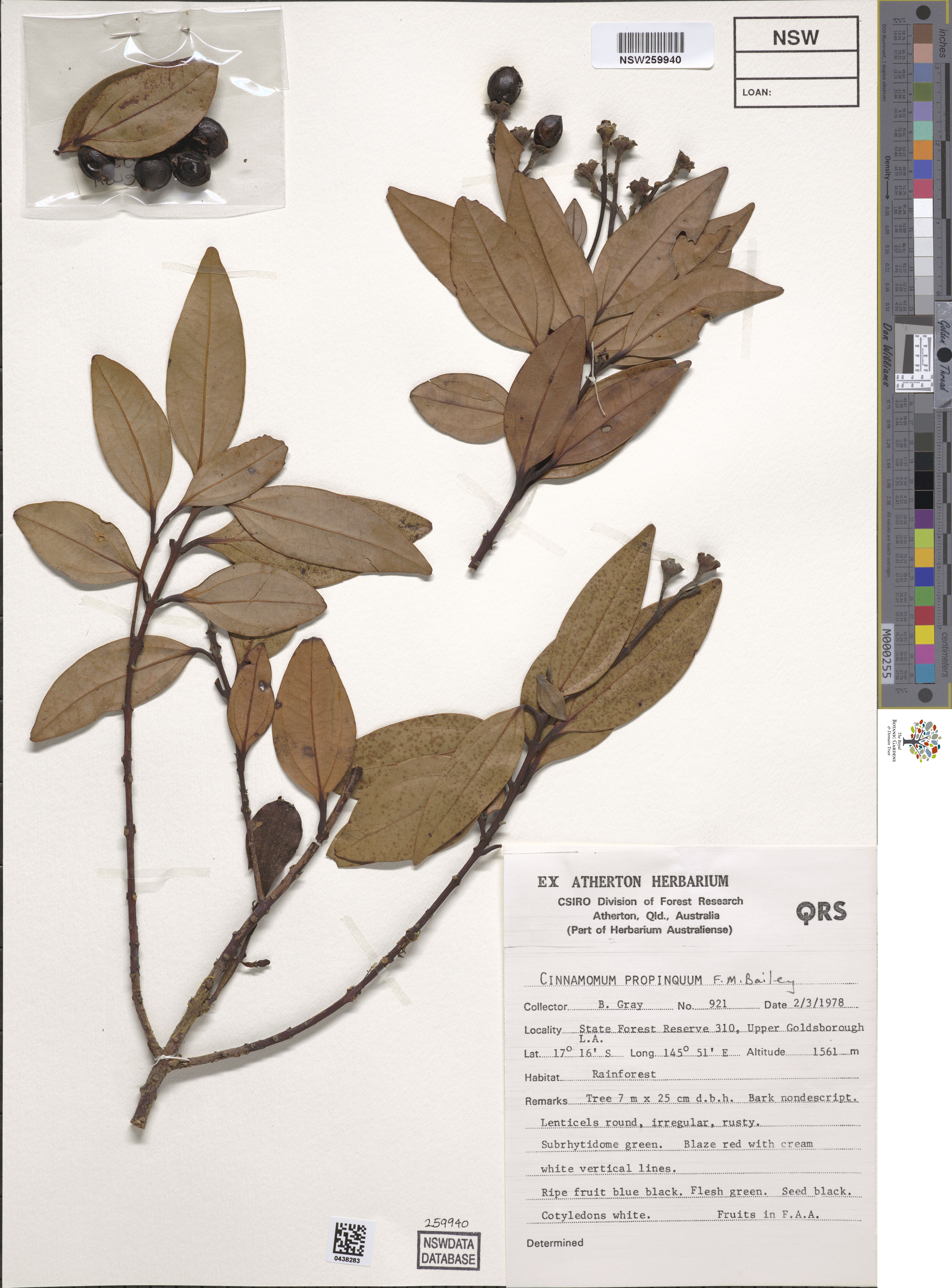
Herbarium specimen
