= Cinnamomum cuspidatum =

Conservation status
- Least Concern (IUCN 3.1)

Scientific classification
- Kingdom: Plantae
- Clade: Tracheophytes
- Clade: Angiosperms
- Clade: Magnoliids
- Order: Laurales
- Family: Lauraceae
- Genus: Cinnamomum
- Species: C. cuspidatum

Binomial name
- Cinnamomum cuspidatum Miq.

Synonyms
- Cinnamomum caudifolium Kosterm. Cinnamomum graciliflorum Gamble

Species of plant

Cinnamomum cuspidatum is a species of tree in the laurel family (Lauraceae). It is native to Borneo, Sumatra, Java, and Peninsular Malaysia. It is a small tree growing to 7.5 metres tall.

In Borneo it is found in Sarawak (Lawas and Miri districts) and Brunei, where it grows in mixed dipterocarp forest and kerangas forest to 1000 metres elevation.
