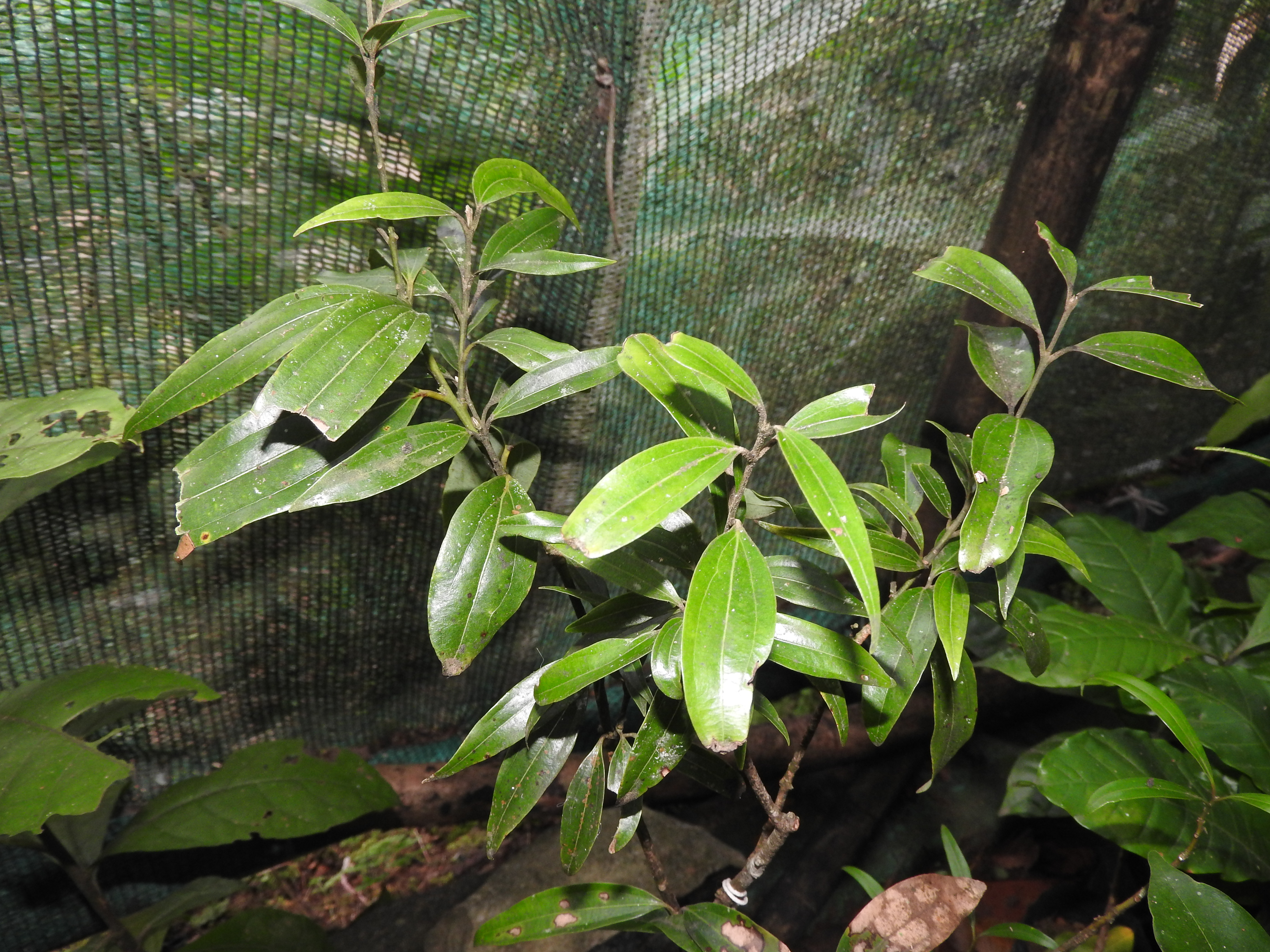

Conservation status
- Endangered (IUCN 3.1)

Scientific classification
- Kingdom: Plantae
- Clade: Tracheophytes
- Clade: Angiosperms
- Clade: Magnoliids
- Order: Laurales
- Family: Lauraceae
- Genus: Cinnamomum
- Species: C. riparium

Binomial name
- Cinnamomum riparium Gamble

= Cinnamomum riparium =

Species of tree

Cinnamomum riparium is a small tree reaching 3–6 m in height Leaves are simple, opposite or sub-opposite, and three-nerved. The inflorescence is a lax, few-flowered panicle. Flowers are about 1.4 cm long, greenish-yellow. The fruit is a smooth ellipsoid berry, 10–13 × 5 mm, seated in a shallow, cup-shaped cupule about 4 mm long.

== Distribution ==
South India (Kerala & Tamil Nadu).

== Flowering and fruiting ==
December–May.
