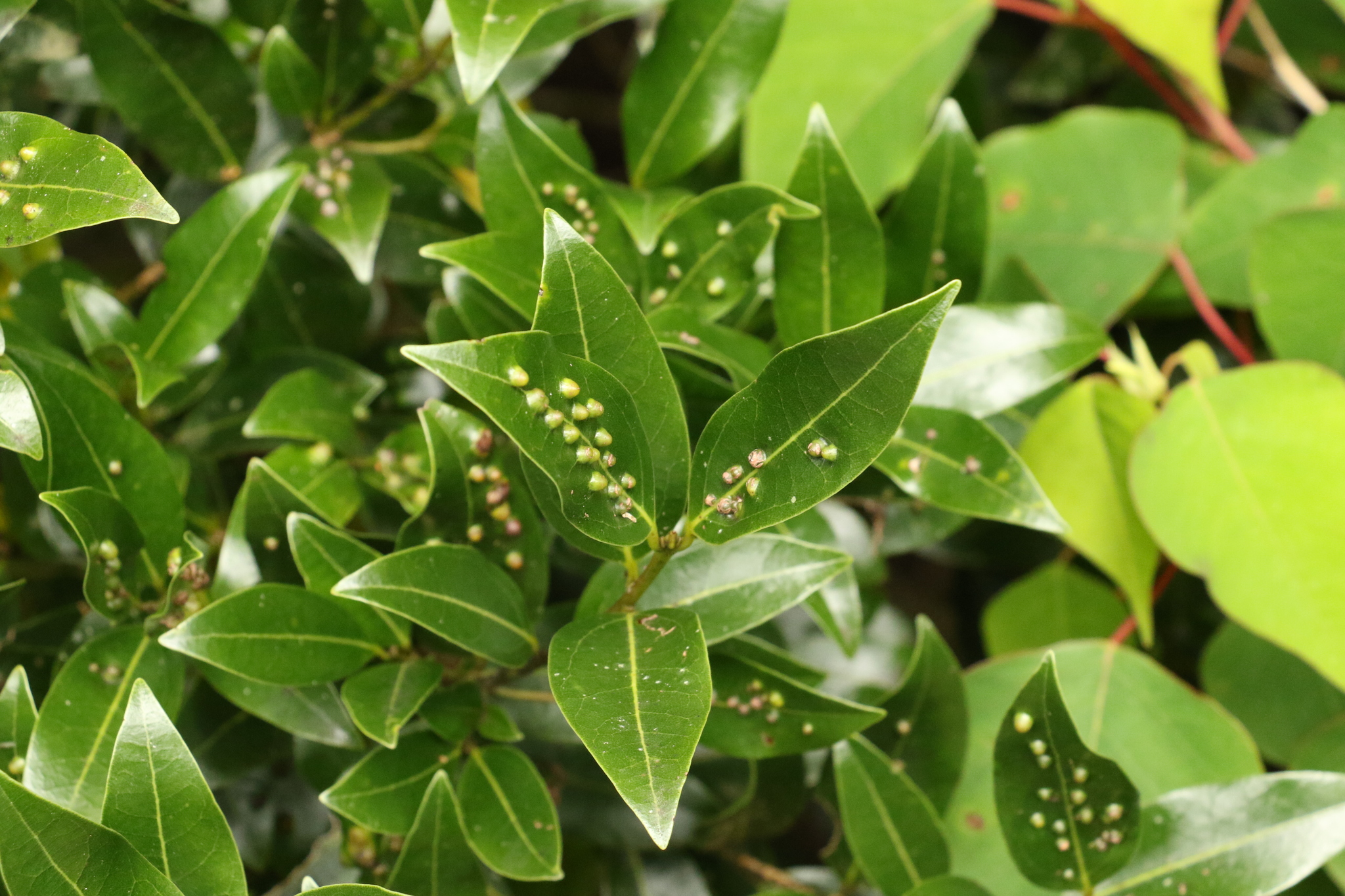
- In Guanaba-Springbrook, Queensland

Conservation status
- Least Concern (IUCN 3.1)

Scientific classification
- Kingdom: Plantae
- Clade: Tracheophytes
- Clade: Angiosperms
- Clade: Magnoliids
- Order: Laurales
- Family: Lauraceae
- Genus: Cinnamomum
- Species: C. virens

Binomial name
- Cinnamomum virens R.T.Baker

= Cinnamomum virens =

Species of tree

Cinnamomum virens is a rainforest tree growing in the eastern coastal region of Australia. Common names include red-barked sassafras, black sassafras, camphorwood, scentless cinnamon wood, and native camphor laurel. Its habitat is between the Williams River (New South Wales) and the Main Range National Park in Queensland. Growing in rich volcanic soils or on poorer sedimentary soils, it is often in association with coachwood.

== Description ==
A medium-sized tree up to 30 m tall, it has a stem diameter of 60 cm. The tree's crown is small and not spreading. The trunk is cylindrical and straight, somewhat flanged at the base on larger trees. Its bark is reddish brown and fairly smooth, but with some squares of bark and corky protuberances about 1 cm in size. Small branches on this species are usually green and smooth.

The leaves are simple, opposite on the stem, and elliptical in shape with a blunt tip. They are 5 to 12 cm long, 2 to 3 cm wide, smooth and glossy green above, and duller green below. They are partially three-veined with the first pair of secondary veins reaching around half the length of the leaf before terminating at the leaf edge.

Flowers form on panicles between February and July. The fruit is a black, fleshy drupe, oval in shape, 10 to 12 mm long, and 6 to 8 mm wide. The base of the fruit is sunken into a six-sided calyx tube. The single seed is 8 mm long and 5 mm wide, ripening from August to December. Fresh seeds should be sown, as they quickly dry out.
