= Cinnamomum dubium =

Wild cinnamon

Conservation status
- Least Concern (IUCN 3.1)

Scientific classification
- Kingdom: Plantae
- Clade: Tracheophytes
- Clade: Angiosperms
- Clade: Magnoliids
- Order: Laurales
- Family: Lauraceae
- Genus: Cinnamomum
- Species: C. dubium

Binomial name
- Cinnamomum dubium Nees

Synonyms
- Cinnamomum multiflorum (Roxb.) Wight; Cinnamomum multiflorum var. elongatum Meisn.; Cinnamomum thwaitesii Lukman.; Cinnamomum villosum Wight; Cinnamomum villosum Wight ex Meisn.; Cinnamomum zeylanicum var. multiflorum (Roxb.) Thwaites; Laurus dubia Wall.; Laurus multiflora Roxb.

Species of flowering plant

Cinnamomum dubium, called wild cinnamon or wal kurundu in Sinhalese, is an evergreen tree native to Sri Lanka and Myanmar. It is used as a timber tree.
