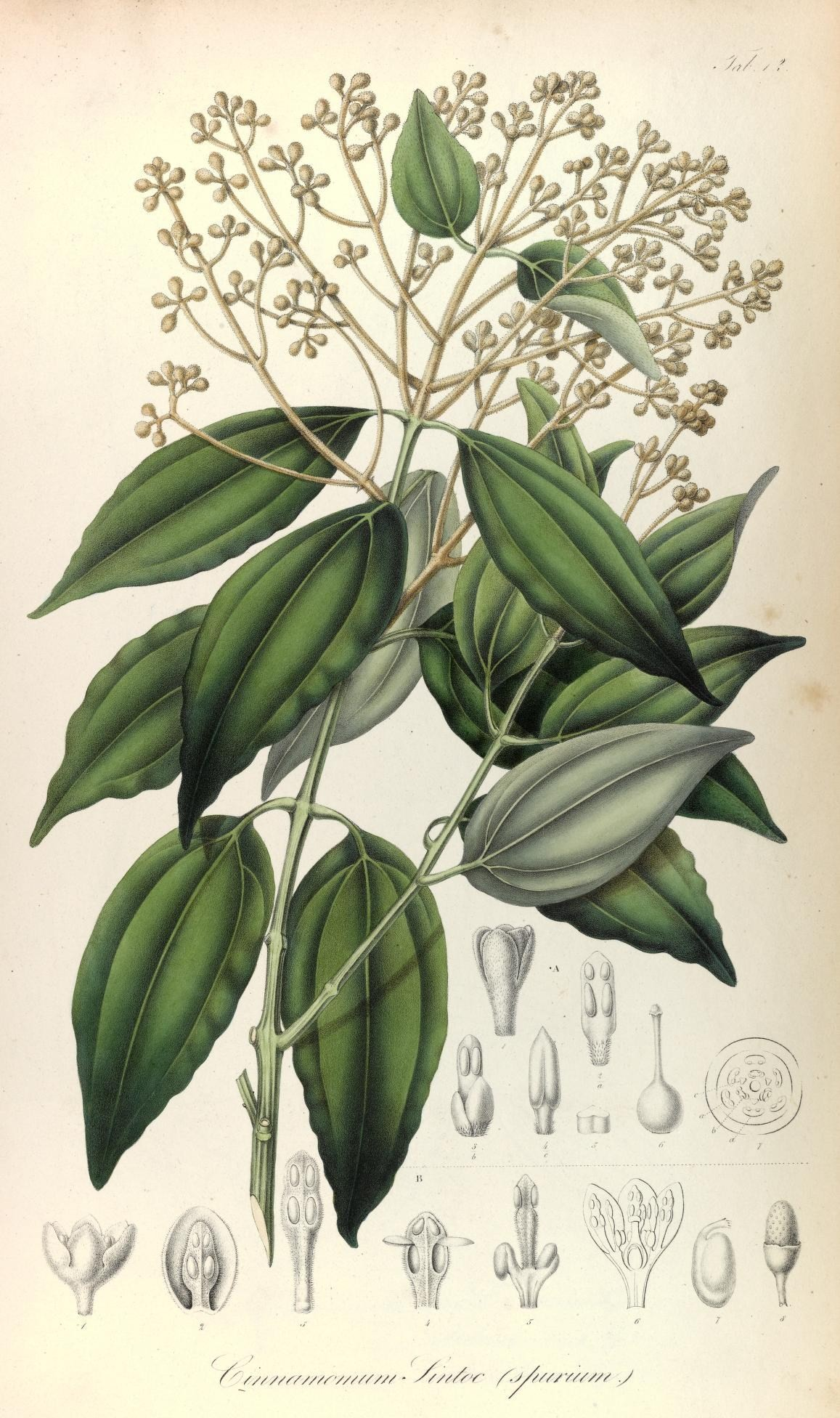

Conservation status
- Least Concern (IUCN 3.1)

Scientific classification
- Kingdom: Plantae
- Clade: Tracheophytes
- Clade: Angiosperms
- Clade: Magnoliids
- Order: Laurales
- Family: Lauraceae
- Genus: Cinnamomum
- Species: C. sintoc

Binomial name
- Cinnamomum sintoc Blume

Synonyms
- Synonymy: Persea sintoc (Blume) Bisch.; Cinnamomum calophyllum Nees; Cinnamomum camphoratum Blume; Cinnamomum cinereum Gamble; Cinnamomum coriaceum Cammerl.; Cinnamomum grande Kosterm. (fossil name); Cinnamomum laxiflorum Meisn.; Cinnamomum pseudosintok Miq.; Cinnamomum soegengii Kosterm.; Laurus calophylla Reinw. ex Nees & T.Nees

= Cinnamomum sintoc =

Species of tree

Cinnamomum sintoc is a species of tree in the laurel family (Lauraceae). It is native to Borneo, Sumatra, Peninsular Malaysia, and Java. It is a tree growing to 27 metres tall, with a trunk to 30 cm in diameter.

In Borneo it is native to Sarawak (Lundu District) and West and East Kalimantan, where it grows in mixed dipterocarp forest on sandy soil to 60 metres elevation.
