= Cinnamomum calciphilum =

Conservation status
- Endangered (IUCN 3.1)

Scientific classification
- Kingdom: Plantae
- Clade: Tracheophytes
- Clade: Angiosperms
- Clade: Magnoliids
- Order: Laurales
- Family: Lauraceae
- Genus: Cinnamomum
- Species: C. calciphilum

Binomial name
- Cinnamomum calciphilum Kosterm.

Synonyms
- Cinnamomum arbusculum Kosterm.

Species of tree

Cinnamomum calciphilum is a species of tree in the laurel family (Lauraceae). It is endemic to Borneo. It is a small tree to 12 metres tall, with a trunk 10 cm in diameter.

It is known only from Sarawak (Bau, Kuching and Miri districts). It is restricted to limestone hills where it is found frequently on peat soil to 1,300 metres elevation.
