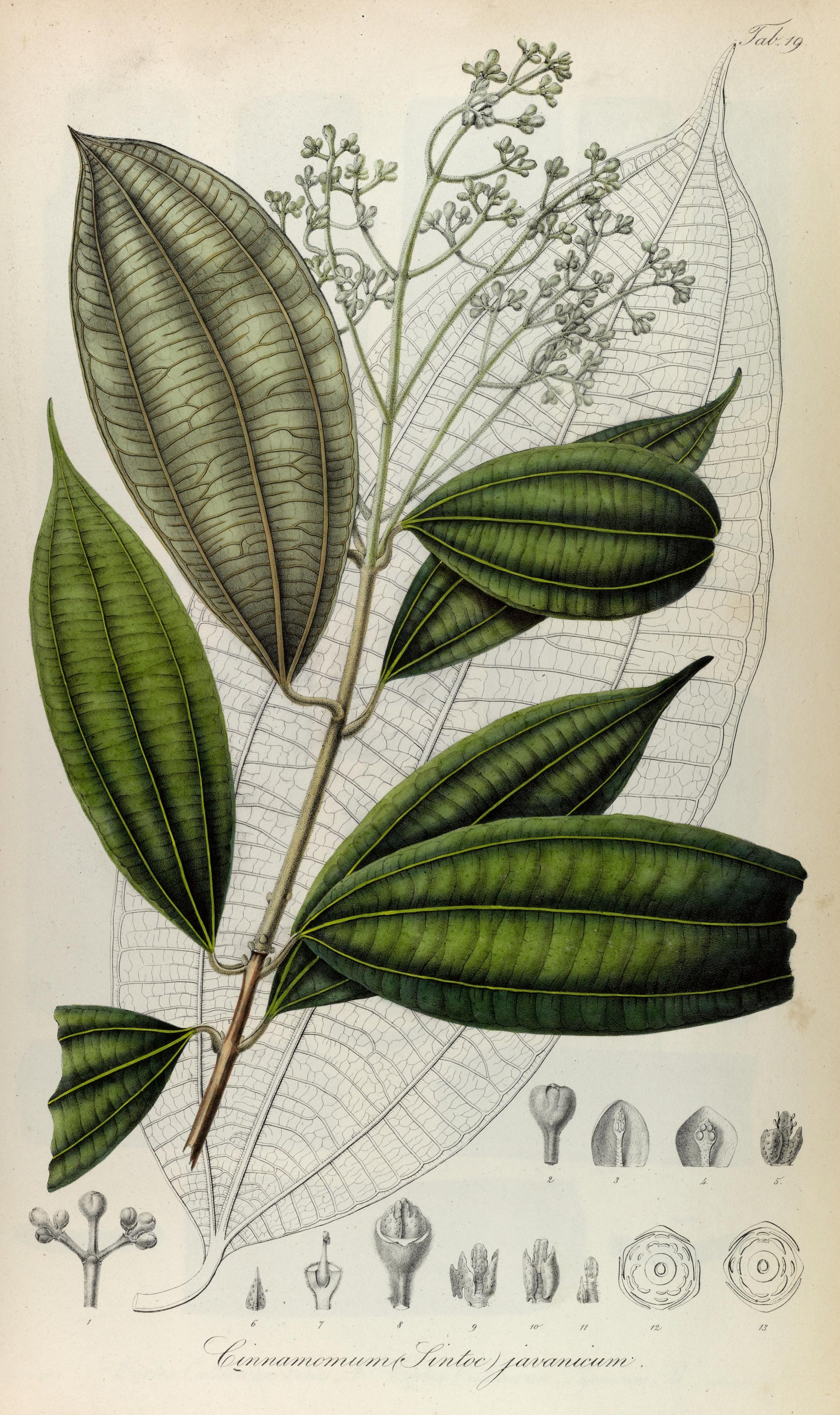

Conservation status
- Least Concern (IUCN 3.1)

Scientific classification
- Kingdom: Plantae
- Clade: Tracheophytes
- Clade: Angiosperms
- Clade: Magnoliids
- Order: Laurales
- Family: Lauraceae
- Genus: Cinnamomum
- Species: C. javanicum

Binomial name
- Cinnamomum javanicum Blume

Synonyms
- Cinnamomum safrol Kosterm.

= Cinnamomum javanicum =

Species of tree

Cinnamomum javanicum is a species of tree in the laurel family (Lauraceae). It is found in Indonesia and Malaysia, where it is native to Borneo, Sumatra, Java, and Peninsular Malaysia.

== Range and habitat ==
Cinnamomum javanicum is native to Borneo, Sumatra, Java, and Peninsular Malaysia.

In Borneo it is known from Sarawak (Belaga, Kuching, Lawas, Limbang, Marudi and Miri districts), Sabah (Beaufort, Keningau, Kinabatangan, Labuk Sugut, Lahad Datu, Ranau, Sandakan, Sipitang, Tambunan, Tawau, Tenom and Tuaran districts), Brunei, and East and West Kalimantan, where it grows in primary kerangas, mixed dipterocarp, and lower montane forests from 300 to 1300 metres elevation.
