= Tsheringma tea =

Herbal tea made in Bhutan

Tsheringma is a herbal tea made in Bhutan. The name is derived from the Bhutanese goddess of longevity, wealth and prosperity.

It is taken as Bhutanese traditional medicine. The tea consists of two ingredients: the first is the petals of the safflower plant (Carthamus tinctorius) known as gurgum, and the second ingredient is the root bark from the plant Cinnamomum tamala (known locally as shing-tsha), which gives the beverage flavor.
