= Cinnamomum paiei =

Conservation status
- Vulnerable (IUCN 3.1)

Scientific classification
- Kingdom: Plantae
- Clade: Tracheophytes
- Clade: Angiosperms
- Clade: Magnoliids
- Order: Laurales
- Family: Lauraceae
- Genus: Cinnamomum
- Species: C. paiei

Binomial name
- Cinnamomum paiei Kosterm. (1988)

Species of tree

Cinnamomum paiei is a species of tree in the laurel family (Lauraceae). It is endemic to Borneo. It is a tree growing to 12 metres tall, with a trunk up to 20 cm in diameter.

It is known only from Sarawak (Bau, Sri Aman, and Tatau districts). It grows in mixed dipterocarp forest on sandy clay soil up to 850 metres elevation.
