= Cinnamomum walaiwarense =

Conservation status
- Critically Endangered (IUCN 3.1)

Scientific classification
- Kingdom: Plantae
- Clade: Tracheophytes
- Clade: Angiosperms
- Clade: Magnoliids
- Order: Laurales
- Family: Lauraceae
- Genus: Cinnamomum
- Species: C. walaiwarense

Binomial name
- Cinnamomum walaiwarense Kosterm.

Species of flowering plant

Cinnamomum walaiwarense is a critically endangered species in the family Lauraceae. It is a tree which grows up to 15 metres high and is endemic to the southern Western Ghats of Kerala and Tamil Nadu in southwestern India. It grows in montane wet evergreen forest from 800 to 1,500 metres elevation.

The species was described by André Joseph Guillaume Henri Kostermans in 1985.
