= Cinnamomum talawaense =

Conservation status
- Critically Endangered (IUCN 3.1)

Scientific classification
- Kingdom: Plantae
- Clade: Tracheophytes
- Clade: Angiosperms
- Clade: Magnoliids
- Order: Laurales
- Family: Lauraceae
- Genus: Cinnamomum
- Species: C. talawaense

Binomial name
- Cinnamomum talawaense Kosterm.

Species of tree

Cinnamomum talawaense is a species of tree in the laurel family (Lauraceae). It is endemic to islands in the Bismarck Archipelago in Papua New Guinea. In 2020 it was classified as being critically endangered.
