= Cinnamomum kalbaricum =

Conservation status
- Endangered (IUCN 3.1)

Scientific classification
- Kingdom: Plantae
- Clade: Tracheophytes
- Clade: Angiosperms
- Clade: Magnoliids
- Order: Laurales
- Family: Lauraceae
- Genus: Cinnamomum
- Species: C. kalbaricum

Binomial name
- Cinnamomum kalbaricum Doweld

Synonyms
- Cinnamomum grandifolium Cammerl. (fossil name); Cinnamomum maximum Govaerts

Species of tree

Cinnamomum kalbaricum is a species of tree in the laurel family (Lauraceae). It is endemic to Borneo.

It is known from Sarawak (Lawas and Marudi districts) and West Kalimantan. It grows in lowland rain forests.
