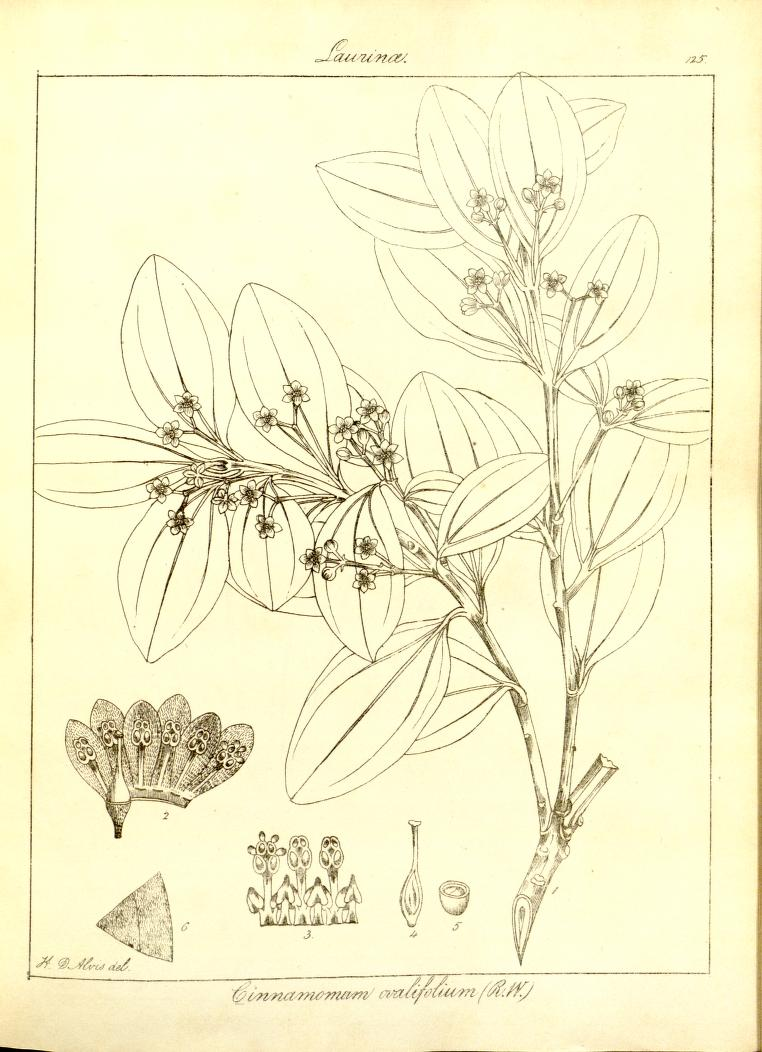
- Cinnamomum ovalifolium by H. de Alwis

Conservation status
- Vulnerable (IUCN 3.1)

Scientific classification
- Kingdom: Plantae
- Clade: Tracheophytes
- Clade: Angiosperms
- Clade: Magnoliids
- Order: Laurales
- Family: Lauraceae
- Genus: Cinnamomum
- Species: C. ovalifolium

Binomial name
- Cinnamomum ovalifolium Wight

= Cinnamomum ovalifolium =

Species of flowering plant

Cinnamomum ovalifolium, called wild cinnamon or wal kurundu in Sinhala, is a species of flowering plant in the family Lauraceae. It is an evergreen shrub or small tree which grows 4 to 12 metres tall and is native to Sri Lanka and possibly Kerala in southern India. It grows in evergreen montane rain forest from 1,500 to 2,000 metres elevation. It is threatened by habitat loss from deforestation from expanding agriculture and plantations. The IUCN Red List assesses the species as Vulnerable.

The species was described by Robert Wight in 1839.
