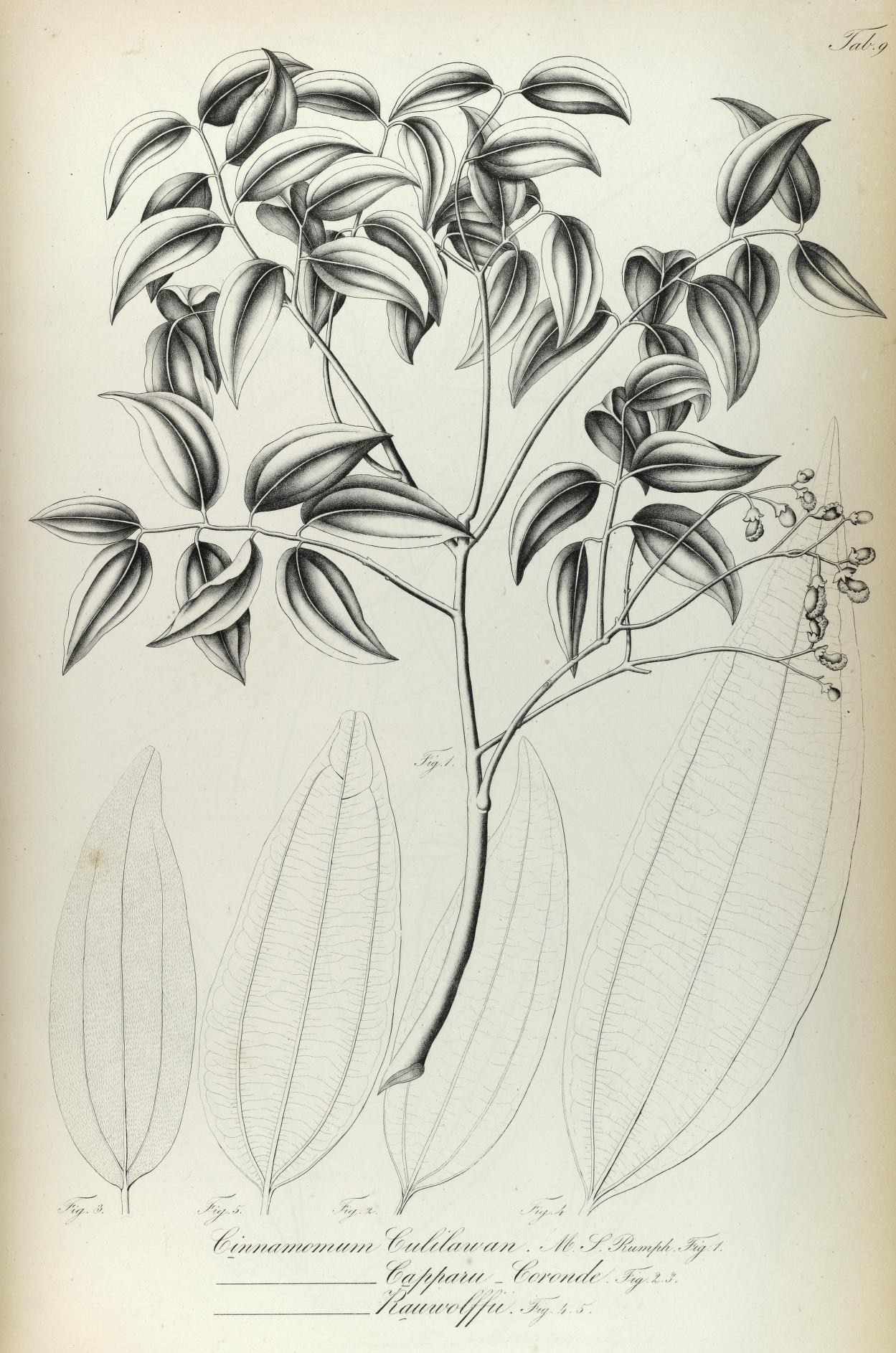
- Botanical illustration

Conservation status
- Vulnerable (IUCN 3.1)

Scientific classification
- Kingdom: Plantae
- Clade: Tracheophytes
- Clade: Angiosperms
- Clade: Magnoliids
- Order: Laurales
- Family: Lauraceae
- Genus: Cinnamomum
- Species: C. capparu-coronde

Binomial name
- Cinnamomum capparu-coronde Blume

= Cinnamomum capparu-coronde =

Species of plant

Cinnamomum capparu-coronde is a species of flowering plant in the family Lauraceae. It is found only in 8 to 10 localities in southwestern Sri Lanka, and is assessed as Vulnerable, as it is being encroached upon by human agricultural activities. A tree, it is typically found in the seasonally dry tropics at elevations from 400 to 1,400 m (1,300 to 4,600 ft). It is a crop wild relative of Cinnamomum verum, true cinnamon.
