= Cinnamomum tahijanum =

Conservation status
- Vulnerable (IUCN 3.1)

Scientific classification
- Kingdom: Plantae
- Clade: Tracheophytes
- Clade: Angiosperms
- Clade: Magnoliids
- Order: Laurales
- Family: Lauraceae
- Genus: Cinnamomum
- Species: C. tahijanum

Binomial name
- Cinnamomum tahijanum Kosterm.

Synonyms
- Cinnamomum bintulense Kosterm. Cinnamomum fouilloyi Kosterm.

Species of tree

Cinnamomum tahijanum is a species of tree in the laurel family (Lauraceae). It is endemic to Borneo. It is a tree growing 10 to 20 metres tall, with a trunk 10 to 38 cm in diameter.

It is known from Sarawak (Bintulu, Kuching, and Tatau districts) and Sabah (Tenom and Ranau districts) in Malaysian Borneo. It grows in mixed dipterocarp and riverine forests at an elevation of 60 to 1300 metres
