= Cinnamomum corneri =

Conservation status
- Near Threatened (IUCN 3.1)

Scientific classification
- Kingdom: Plantae
- Clade: Tracheophytes
- Clade: Angiosperms
- Clade: Magnoliids
- Order: Laurales
- Family: Lauraceae
- Genus: Cinnamomum
- Species: C. corneri

Binomial name
- Cinnamomum corneri Kosterm.

Species of tree

Cinnamomum corneri is a species of tree in the laurel family (Lauraceae). It is endemic to Borneo. It is a small tree growing to 6 meters tall, with a trunk to 12 cm in diameter.

It is known only in Sabah (Ranau District). It grows in primary upland mixed dipterocarp and lower montane forest from 1200 to 1700 metres elevation.
