= Cinnamomum cambodianum =

Conservation status
- Critically Endangered (IUCN 3.1)

Scientific classification
- Kingdom: Plantae
- Clade: Tracheophytes
- Clade: Angiosperms
- Clade: Magnoliids
- Order: Laurales
- Family: Lauraceae
- Genus: Cinnamomum
- Species: C. cambodianum

Binomial name
- Cinnamomum cambodianum Lecomte

Species of tree

Cinnamomum cambodianum (Khmer: ទេព្វិរូ, teppirou) is a non-scented species of cinnamon, native and endemic to Cambodia. Commonly referred to as Cambodia cinnamon, C. cambodianum is an evergreen tree with a large, dense crown, growing 15–25 metres tall. The straight, cylindrical bole can grow to 30–80 cm in diameter.

== Distribution ==
Cinnamomum cambodianum is endemic to Cambodia and is plentiful on the upper slopes of the Cardamom Mountains, including the Elephant Mountains, in the southwest of Cambodia. There are disjunct populations in Ratanakiri and Kampong Thom Province, in the northeast of the country.

== Habitat ==
This species of cinnamon grows in wet, dense, foothill rain forests from 600–700 m above sea level. When young, it is a shade-demanding tree and it grows well in deep soil. It usually grows in clusters of 5–10 trees in the primary of secondary forest, at elevations below 1,500 m above sea level. The gene-ecological zone for C. cambodianum is the central Annamites.

== Uses ==
In Cambodia, C. cambodianum is extensively harvested from the wild for local use as a food condiment, traditional medicine, and source of wood. The wood is a highly valued timber in Cambodia, normally used for house construction. The bark is sometimes chewed with betel. In Khmer traditional medicine, the bark is believed to be effective against indigestion, tuberculosis, and for regulation of menstruation. For animals it is used as a carminative and digestive. C. cambodianum has shown significant anti-allergic properties in laboratory tests.

C. cambodianum is a non-scented species of cinnamon, but all parts of the stem are aromatic. Commercially, the bark of this tree is often used in China for the production of non-scented incense sticks.

== Bioactive compounds ==
Cinnamomum cambodianum contains significant concentrations of cinnamaldehyde and eugenol in its volatile oils.

== Conservation ==
Cinnamomum cambodianum has come under high pressure from over-exploitation and is considered in danger of extinction unless measures are taken to provide adequate protection from illegal logging. The number of mature trees has been reduced significantly and it is difficult to find enough useful sources of germplasm.

In 2009, C. cambodianum was estimated to be at threat level 4 (where 5 is the most severe) by Bioversity International and others. In 2019 the IUCN Red List assessed the species as Critically Endangered.

== See also ==
- Deforestation in Cambodia

== Sources ==
- Useful Tropical Plants: Cinnamomum cambodianum
- Cambodia Tree Seed Project (April 2004, p. 45-46): Cinnamomum cambodianum Lecomte
