= Cinnamomum pendulum =

Conservation status
- Least Concern (IUCN 3.1)

Scientific classification
- Kingdom: Plantae
- Clade: Tracheophytes
- Clade: Angiosperms
- Clade: Magnoliids
- Order: Laurales
- Family: Lauraceae
- Genus: Cinnamomum
- Species: C. pendulum

Binomial name
- Cinnamomum pendulum Cammerl.

Synonyms
- Cinnamomum microcarpum Kosterm. Cinnamomum soepadmoi Kosterm.

Species of tree

Cinnamomum pendulum is a species of tree in the laurel family (Lauraceae). It is endemic to Borneo. It is a tree growing to 10–26 metres tall, with a trunk to 14–45 cm in diameter.

It is found in Sarawak (Bintulu, Marudi, Miri, Lundu, Sri Aman and Tatau districts), Sabah (Ranau District), Brunei, and Kalimantan (East, Central, and West). It grows in primary mixed dipterocarp and lower montane forest, on shallow sandy clay soil or sandstone-derived soils on ridges, from 650 to 1100 metres elevation.
