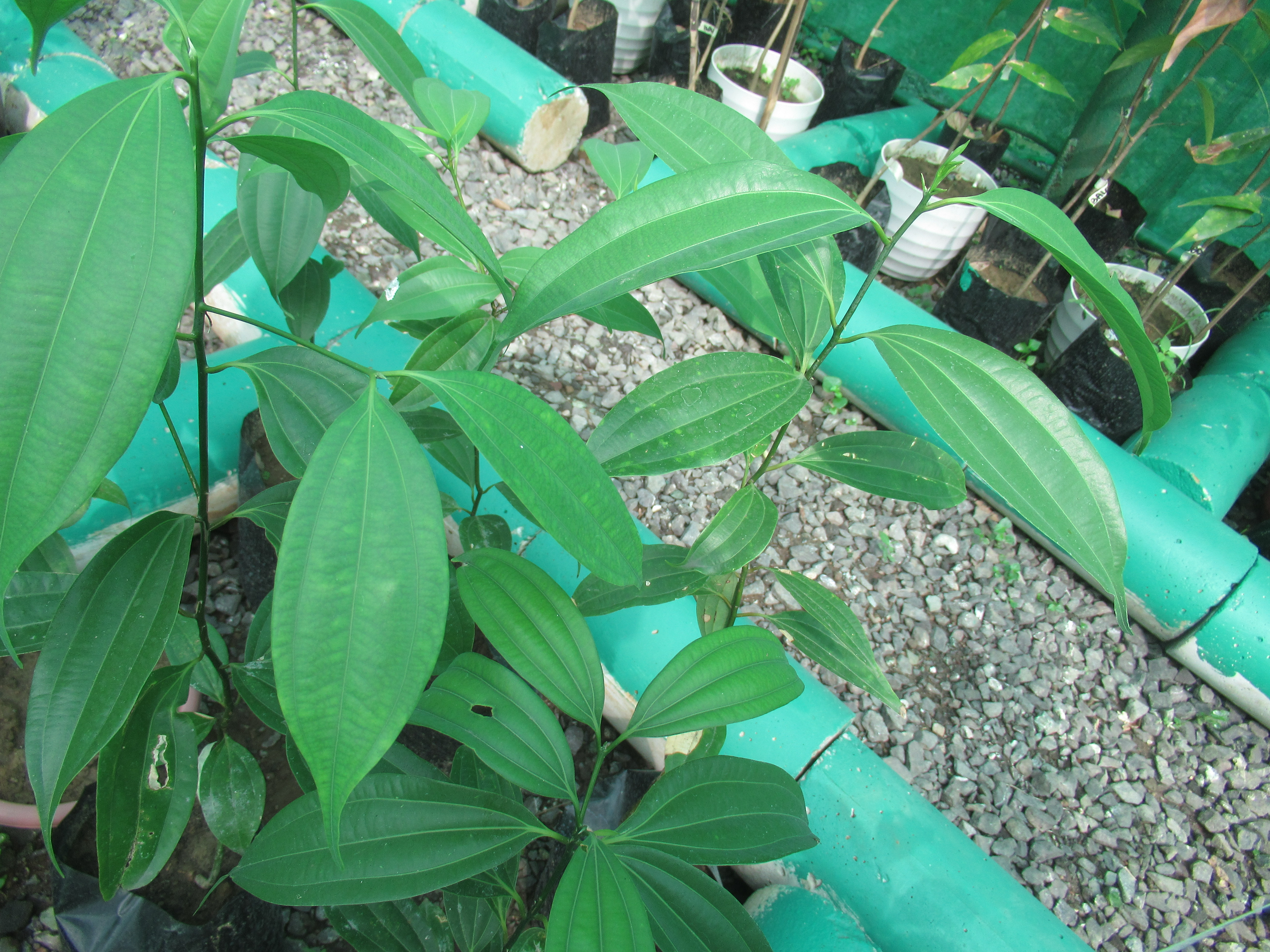

Conservation status
- Least Concern (IUCN 3.1)

Scientific classification
- Kingdom: Plantae
- Clade: Tracheophytes
- Clade: Angiosperms
- Clade: Magnoliids
- Order: Laurales
- Family: Lauraceae
- Genus: Cinnamomum
- Species: C. mercadoi

Binomial name
- Cinnamomum mercadoi S.Vidal

= Cinnamomum mercadoi =

Species of tree

Cinnamomum mercadoi (kalingag) is a small tree, about 6 to 10 metres (20 to 33 ft) high, with a thick, aromatic bark. The plant part of the family Lauraceae, which contains about 45 genera and 2000-2500 species, and is related to the culinary cinnamon, sassafras, and bay tree. The plant is indigenous to the Philippines, where it grows best in forests at low and medium altitudes that sometimes ascend to 2,000 metres (6,600 ft). C. mercadoi is unusual in the cinnamon family in that its essential oil consists large amounts of safrol, whereas other oils of cinnamon contain cinnamaldehyde. Previously listed in the International Union for Conservation of Nature (IUCN) Red List as vulnerable due to the overharvesting and the continuous loss of the Philippine forests, it is now listed as least concern, although habitat loss and degradation remain threats.

== Distribution ==
Cinnamomum mercadoi is endemic to the Philippines, where it is found from the Babuyan Islands and northern Luzon to Mindanao.

== Habitat and ecology ==
Cinnamomum mercadoi plants are monoecious and are variable in the height, shape, size, and texture of the leaves. They typically grow in primary and secondary forests at elevations of about 300 to 700 metres (980 to 2,300 ft) but are able to ascend to 2,000 metres (6,600 ft). They grow best in subtropical and mild temperate forest conditions where high humidity and relatively stable, mild temperatures are found. They also grow best in pH levels of about 4 to 5 and their seeds are mainly dispersed via birds such as the fruit-specialized hornbills which account for the scattered distribution and regeneration of the tree species across the island.

== Description ==
The leaves of the C. mercadoi are simple, opposite or subopposite, smooth, pale green, ovately-oblong or broadly lanceolate. The leaves are also sometimes subelliptic, usually 8 to 20 centimeters long and 4 to 6 centimeters wide, and are pointed at both ends, with petioles 5 to 15 millimeters long. The inflorescence is erect and grows from the uppermost leaf axils, about 10 centimeters long. The petals are smooth and rarely exerted. The calyx is canescent and turbinate. Finally, the bark is gray and does not have any fissures or cracks. It is covered irregularly with corky pustules and thus giving the bark a slightly rough appearance.

== Flowers and fruit ==
The flowers of the C. mercadoi are greenish-yellow and include in terminal or subterminal panicles up to 15 centimeters long. The fruits are smooth, shiny, steel blue, elliptic-shaped, seated on a bowl-shaped perianth cup, and are usually 12 x 8 millimeters in dimension. The seeds are smooth and are narrow to elliptic-shaped.

== Use ==
=== Food ===
The sassafras aroma and taste that the leaves and bark of the C. mercadoi may be added to root beers to give them flavor.

=== Medicinal ===
There are several medicinal properties of C. mercadoi including its usage as a(n) diaphoretic, parasiticide, antispasmodic, aphrodisiac, analgesic, and diuretic. The bark of C. mercadoi has traditionally been used in medicine in the Philippines. In 1668, the Jesuit Ignatio Francisco Alzina reported that eating it aided digestion and since then, it has been employed to treat digestive troubles. It was also employed as a treatment for headaches and rheumatism and has been used as a rubefacient. Furthermore, the bark is used as a(n) carminative, stimulant, astringent, antiseptic, antifungal, and antiviral property. Finally, the decoction of the leaves is a remedy for flatulence and menstrual problems in women.

=== Chemistry ===
In a study by Bacon (1909), one of the earliest chemical studies on the C. mercadoi reported the presence of essential oil, oleoresin, and resin. It was discovered that the oil primarily contained safrole and a further study conducted by Concha (1966), showed that the volatile oil and safrole were found in the leaves, bark, and roots of the plant. Sapogenin was also found to be present in the leaves and seeds of the C. mercadoi, as was reported by Anzaldo (1958). Phytochemical screening of the crude methanol extract of the plant indicated the presence of saponins, condensed tannins, an unsaturated lactone ring, and leucoanthocyanins.
