= Cinnamomum kerangas =

Conservation status
- Endangered (IUCN 3.1)

Scientific classification
- Kingdom: Plantae
- Clade: Tracheophytes
- Clade: Angiosperms
- Clade: Magnoliids
- Order: Laurales
- Family: Lauraceae
- Genus: Cinnamomum
- Species: C. kerangas

Binomial name
- Cinnamomum kerangas Kosterm.

Species of tree

Cinnamomum kerangas is a species of tree in the laurel family (Lauraceae). It is endemic to Borneo, where it is commonly known as medang tija or tija kerangas in Malay. It is a small tree or shrub which grows 6 to 11 metres tall, with a trunk 6–15 cm in diameter.

It is known from Sarawak (Kuching District) and West Kalimantan. In Sarawak the species is known only from Setapok Forest Reserve in Kuching District. It grows in peat swamp and kerangas forests on podsol soils, to 30 metres elevation.
