= Cinnamomum politum =

Conservation status
- Least Concern (IUCN 3.1)

Scientific classification
- Kingdom: Plantae
- Clade: Tracheophytes
- Clade: Angiosperms
- Clade: Magnoliids
- Order: Laurales
- Family: Lauraceae
- Genus: Cinnamomum
- Species: C. politum

Binomial name
- Cinnamomum politum Miq.

Synonyms
- Cinnamomum xylophyllum Kosterm.

Species of tree

Cinnamomum politum is a species of tree in the laurel family (Lauraceae). It is endemic to Borneo.

== Description ==
Cinnamomum politum is a tree growing to 30 metres tall, with a trunk to 75 cm in diameter. Specimens from lower montane forest have smaller leaf size and shorter inflorescence length than the lowland specimens.

== Range and habitat ==
It is native to Sarawak (Bintulu, Lundu, Marudi and Miri districts), Sabah (Papar district), Brunei, and East Kalimantan. It grows in mixed dipterocarp forest on leached sandy soil, podsolised white sand or sandstone-derived soil to 1000 metres elevation, in kerangas forest, and in lower montane forest up to 1470 metres elevation.
