= Cinnamomum sublanuginosum =

Conservation status
- Vulnerable (IUCN 3.1)

Scientific classification
- Kingdom: Plantae
- Clade: Tracheophytes
- Clade: Angiosperms
- Clade: Magnoliids
- Order: Laurales
- Family: Lauraceae
- Genus: Cinnamomum
- Species: C. sublanuginosum

Binomial name
- Cinnamomum sublanuginosum Kosterm.

Synonyms
- Cinnamomum woodii Kosterm.

Species of tree

Cinnamomum sublanuginosum is a species of tree in the laurel family (Lauraceae). It is endemic to Borneo. It is a tree growing 20 to 35 metres tall, with a trunk to 30–50 cm in diameter.

It is known only from Ranau District in Sabah. It grows in montane rain forest above 1200 metres elevation.
