= Cinnamomum subavenium =

Conservation status
- Least Concern (IUCN 3.1)

Scientific classification
- Kingdom: Plantae
- Clade: Tracheophytes
- Clade: Angiosperms
- Clade: Magnoliids
- Order: Laurales
- Family: Lauraceae
- Genus: Cinnamomum
- Species: C. subavenium

Binomial name
- Cinnamomum subavenium Miq.

Synonyms
- Cinnamomum argenteum H.Liu; Cinnamomum bartheifolium Hayata; Cinnamomum borneense Meisn.; Cinnamomum borneense Miq.; Cinnamomum chingii F.P.Metcalf; Cinnamomum cyrtopodum Miq.; Cinnamomum floribundum Miq.; Cinnamomum glabrescens Miq.; Cinnamomum longicarpum Kaneh.; Cinnamomum nooteboomii Kosterm.; Cinnamomum randaiense Hayata; Cinnamomum ridleyi Gamble; Cinnamomum validinerve var. poilanei H.Liu

Species of tree

Cinnamomum subavenium is an evergreen tree from South and East Asia that can become 20 m (66 ft) tall.

== Range and habitat ==
Cinnamomum subavenium ranges from Bangladesh and Myanmar to southern China, Vietnam, Cambodia, Peninsular Malaysia, Sumatra, Borneo, and Sulawesi.

In Borneo it is found in Sarawak (Marudi and Sri Aman districts) and Sabah (Ranau, Tambunan and Sipitang districts) in Malaysian Borneo, and West Kalimantan in Indonesian Borneo. It grows in mixed dipterocarp and lower montane forest to 1500 metres elevation.

== Uses ==
Leaves of Cinnamomum subavenium are an important spice. It is also a Chinese herb that has been suggested for use as a skin whitening agent. The plant contains substances which inhibit production of tyrosinase an enzyme which catalyzes the production of melanin. The herb has not been established as either effective or safe but is being researched by Hui-Min Wang and his colleagues at Kaohsiung Medical University in Taiwan where experiments shown that it was effective at causing zebrafish to lose their stripes.
