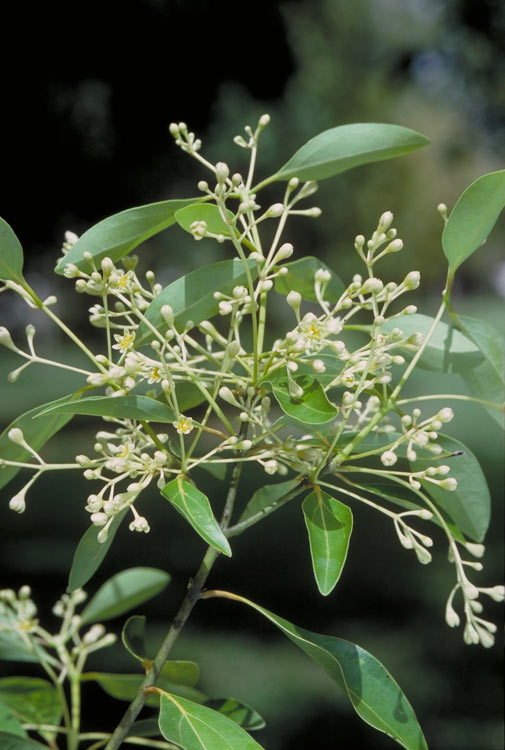
- Inflorescence

Conservation status
- Least Concern (IUCN 3.1)

Scientific classification
- Kingdom: Plantae
- Clade: Embryophytes
- Clade: Tracheophytes
- Clade: Angiosperms
- Clade: Magnoliids
- Order: Laurales
- Family: Lauraceae
- Genus: Cinnamomum
- Species: C. baileyanum

Binomial name
- Cinnamomum baileyanum (F.Muell. ex F.M.Bailey) W.D.Francis
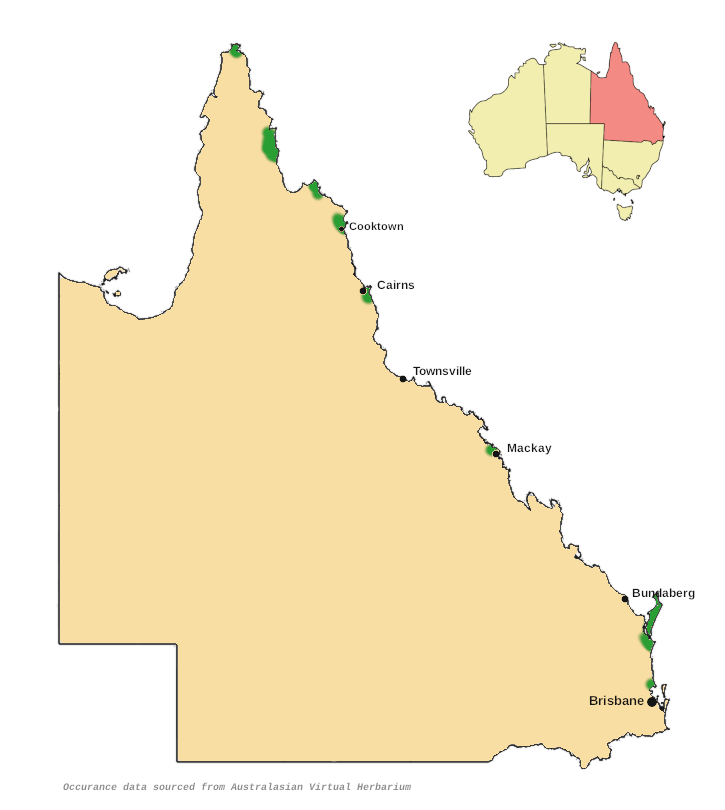

Synonyms
- Persea baileyana F.Muell. ex F.M.Bailey

= Cinnamomum baileyanum =

Species of flowering plant

Cinnamomum baileyanum, commonly known as candlewood or pepperwood, is a species of plant in the family Lauraceae native to eastern Queensland, Australia. It was first described in 1951 and has a conservation status of least-concern.

== Description ==
Cinnamomum baileyanum is a rainforest tree reaching a height of up to 20 m (66 ft). The leaves are green on both sides, elliptic, tri-veined and measure up to 13 cm (5.1 in) long and 5 cm (2.0 in) wide. Inflorescences take the form of a panicle carrying numerous small cream-coloured flowers. They are fragrant and have six tepals about 5 mm (0.20 in) long. The fruit is a black drupe about 20 mm (0.8 in) long and 13 mm (0.5 in) wide. It contains a single brown seed.

== Distribution and habitat ==
It is endemic to Queensland and is found in rainforest and drier forests. It occurs in disjunct populations from the top of Cape York Peninsula to South East Queensland, but is not present in Central Queensland.

== Taxonomy and names ==
This species was first described in 1951 by Australian botanist William Douglas Francis in his book Australian Rain-forest Trees. Common names include pepperwood, candlewood and brown bollywood. The species epithet baileyanum was chosen by Francis in honour of his fellow Australian botanist Frederick Manson Bailey.

== Conservation ==
As of August 2026, this species has been assessed to be of least concern by the International Union for Conservation of Nature (IUCN) and by the Queensland Government in its Wildnet database.
