= Cinnamomum racemosum =

Conservation status
- Least Concern (IUCN 3.1)

Scientific classification
- Kingdom: Plantae
- Clade: Tracheophytes
- Clade: Angiosperms
- Clade: Magnoliids
- Order: Laurales
- Family: Lauraceae
- Genus: Cinnamomum
- Species: C. racemosum

Binomial name
- Cinnamomum racemosum Kosterm.

Synonyms
- Cinnamomum dictyoneuron Kosterm.

Species of tree

Cinnamomum racemosum is a species of tree in the laurel family (Lauraceae). It is endemic to Borneo. It is a medium-sized tree growing to 12 meters tall, with a trunk to 20 cm in diameter.

It is native to Sarawak (Bintulu and Miri districts), Sabah (Kinabatangan, Kota Belud, Kota Kinabalu, Kota Marudu, Penampang, Pensiangan, Ranau, Sandakan, Tenom, and Tuaran districts), and East Kalimantan. It grows in various types of forest to 1500 metres elevation.
