= Cinnamomum rhynchophyllum =

Conservation status
- Least Concern (IUCN 3.1)

Scientific classification
- Kingdom: Plantae
- Clade: Tracheophytes
- Clade: Angiosperms
- Clade: Magnoliids
- Order: Laurales
- Family: Lauraceae
- Genus: Cinnamomum
- Species: C. rhynchophyllum

Binomial name
- Cinnamomum rhynchophyllum Miq.

Synonyms
- Cinnamomum lampongum Miq.; Cinnamomum rhynchophyllum var. lampongum (Miq.) Ridl.

Species of tree

Cinnamomum rhynchophyllum is a species of tree in the laurel family (Lauraceae). It is native to Borneo, Sumatra, and Peninsular Malaysia. It is a small tree growing to 10 metres tall, with a trunk to 15 cm in diameter.

In Borneo it is found in Sarawak (Kuching, Lundu and Marudi districts), Sabah (Lahad Datu, and Tawau districts), and in West, Central, and East Kalimantan, where it grows in mixed dipterocarp forest to 600 metres elevation.
