= Cinnamomum angustitepalum =

Conservation status
- Vulnerable (IUCN 3.1)

Scientific classification
- Kingdom: Plantae
- Clade: Tracheophytes
- Clade: Angiosperms
- Clade: Magnoliids
- Order: Laurales
- Family: Lauraceae
- Genus: Cinnamomum
- Species: C. angustitepalum

Binomial name
- Cinnamomum angustitepalum Kosterm.

Synonyms
- Cinnamomum turfosum Kosterm.

Species of tree

Cinnamomum angustitepalum is a species of tree in the laurel family (Lauraceae). It is endemic to Borneo.

It is a medium-sized tree to 18 metres tall, with a trunk up 30 cm in diameter.

It is found in Sarawak (Bintulu and Kuching districts) and East Kalimantan. It grows in primary mixed dipterocarp and kerangas forests, on sandy soil with a little peat, to 800 metres elevation.
