= Cinnamomum crassinervium =

Conservation status
- Least Concern (IUCN 3.1)

Scientific classification
- Kingdom: Plantae
- Clade: Tracheophytes
- Clade: Angiosperms
- Clade: Magnoliids
- Order: Laurales
- Family: Lauraceae
- Genus: Cinnamomum
- Species: C. crassinervium

Binomial name
- Cinnamomum crassinervium Miq.

Synonyms
- Cinnamomum endlicheriicarpum Kosterm.

Species of tree

Cinnamomum crassinervium is a species of tree in the laurel family (Lauraceae). It is endemic to Borneo. It is a tree growing to 25 metres tall, with a trunk up 16 cm in diameter.

It is known from Sabah (Kinabatangan, Labuk Sagut, Pensiangan, and Ranau districts), Sarawak (Belaga, Bintulu, Kuching, Lawas, Lubok Antu, Marudi, Miri, and Samarahan districts), Brunei, and East Kalimantan. It grows in lowland mixed dipterocarp, kerangas, lower submontane, and limestone forests to 600 metres elevation.
