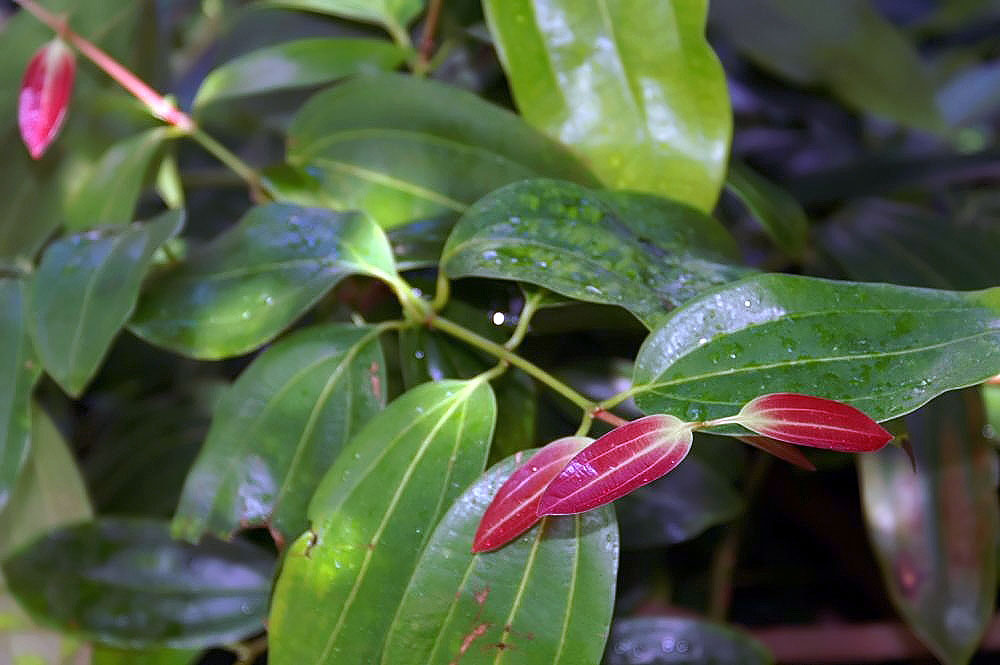
- Cinnamomum verum

Scientific classification
- Kingdom: Plantae
- Clade: Embryophytes
- Clade: Tracheophytes
- Clade: Angiosperms
- Clade: Magnoliids
- Order: Laurales
- Family: Lauraceae
- Genus: Cinnamomum; Schaeff.

Species
- See text

Synonyms
- Camphorina Farw.; Cecidodaphne Nees; Septina Noronha, nom. nud.; Temmodaphne Kosterm.

= Cinnamomum =

Cinnamomum Temporal range: Cretaceous–recent,

Genus of flowering plants

Cinnamomum is a genus of evergreen aromatic trees and shrubs belonging to the laurel family, Lauraceae. The species of Cinnamomum have aromatic oils in their leaves and bark and are best known as the source of the spice cinnamon. The genus contains about 227 species, distributed in tropical and subtropical regions of South Asia, Southeast Asia, East Asia and Oceania/Australasia. The genus includes a great number of economically important trees used to produce the spice cinnamon. The oldest fossils are known from the Cretaceous, but the group reached a peak of diversity during the Eocene.

== Habitat ==
This genus is present in the Himalayas and other mountain areas, in tropical and subtropical montane rainforests, in weed-tree forests, in valleys, and in mixed forests of coniferous and deciduous broad-leaved trees, in southern China, India, and Southeast Asia.

== Characteristics ==
All species tested so far are diploid, with the total number of chromosomes being 24. This Lauraceae genus comprises approximately 250 trees and shrubs and most are aromatic. Some trees produce sprouts. The thick, leathery leaves are dark green, lauroid type. Laurophyll or lauroid leaves are characterized by a generous layer of wax, making them glossy in appearance, and narrow, pointed oval in shape with an 'apical mucro', or 'drip tip', which permits the leaves to shed water despite the humidity, allowing respiration from plant.

Mostly, the plants present a distinct odor. Their alternate leaves are ovate-elliptic, with margins entire or occasionally repand, with acute apices and broadly cuneate to subrounded bases. Upper leaf surfaces are shiny green to yellowish-green, while the undersides are opaque and lighter in color. Mature leaves are dark green. Young leaves are reddish brown to yellowish-red. The leaves are glabrous on both surfaces or sparsely puberulent beneath only when young; the leaves are mostly triplinerved or sometimes inconspicuously five-nerved, with conspicuous midrib on both surfaces. The axils of lateral nerves and veins are conspicuously bullate above and dome-shaped. Terminal buds are perulate.

The axillary panicle is 3.5–7 centimetres (1.4–2.8 in) long. It is a genus of monoecious species, with hermaphrodite flowers, greenish white, white to yellow are glabrous or downy and pale to yellowish brown. Mostly the flowers are small. The perianth is glabrous or puberulent outside and densely pubescent inside. The purplish-black fruit is an ovate, ellipsoidal or subglobose drupe. The perianth-cup in fruit is cupuliform.

The inner bark of several species is used to make the spice cinnamon. C. tamala is used as the herb malabathrum, also called tejpat or Indian bay leaf.

== Taxonomy ==
A 2017 molecular study found that species from the tropical Americas classed in Cinnamomum were not closely related to the Asian and Australasian species, and have been reclassified in the genus Aiouea.

== Accepted species ==
As of July 2025, Plants of the World Online accepts the following 227 species:

- Cinnamomum agasthyamalayanum Robi, Sujanapal & Udayan
- Cinnamomum alibertii Lukman.
- Cinnamomum altissimum Kosterm.
- Cinnamomum anacardium Kosterm.
- Cinnamomum andersonii Lukman.
- Cinnamomum angustifolium Lukman.
- Cinnamomum angustitepalum Kosterm.
- Cinnamomum appelianum Schewe
- Cinnamomum archboldianum C.K.Allen
- Cinnamomum arfakense Kosterm.
- Cinnamomum aromaticum Nees
- Cinnamomum asomicum S.C.Nath & Baruah
- Cinnamomum assamicum Lukman.
- Cinnamomum aubletii Lukman.
- Cinnamomum aureofulvum Gamble
- Cinnamomum auricolor Kosterm. ex Dao
- Cinnamomum austrosinense H.T.Chang
- Cinnamomum austroyunnanense H.W.Li
- Cinnamomum baileyanum (F.Muell. ex F.M.Bailey) Francis
- Cinnamomum balansae Lecomte
- Cinnamomum bamoense Lukman.
- Cinnamomum beccarii Lukman.
- Cinnamomum bejolghota (Buch.-Ham.) Sweet
- Cinnamomum bhaskarii M.Gangop.
- Cinnamomum birmanicum Kosterm.
- Cinnamomum bishnupadae M.Gangop.
- Cinnamomum blumei Lukman.
- Cinnamomum bokorense Tagane & Yahara
- Cinnamomum bonii Lecomte
- Cinnamomum burmanni (Nees & T.Nees) Blume
- Cinnamomum calciphilum Kosterm.
- Cinnamomum cambodianum Lecomte
- Cinnamomum capparu-coronde Blume
- Cinnamomum carrierei Lukman.
- Cinnamomum caryophyllus (Lour.) S.Moore
- Cinnamomum cebuense Kosterm.
- Cinnamomum celebicum Miq.
- Cinnamomum chago B.S.Sun & H.L.Zhao
- Cinnamomum champokianum Baruah & S.C.Nath
- Cinnamomum chantinii Lukman.
- Cinnamomum chekiangense Nakai
- Cinnamomum chemungianum M.Mohanan & A.N.Henry
- Cinnamomum chingchuanium S.S.Ying
- Cinnamomum citriodorum Thwaites
- Cinnamomum clemensii C.K.Allen
- Cinnamomum contractum H.W.Li
- Cinnamomum cordatum Kosterm.
- Cinnamomum corneri Kosterm.
- Cinnamomum crassinervium Miq.
- Cinnamomum crenulicupulum Kosterm.
- Cinnamomum cubittii Ormerod
- Cinnamomum culitlawan (L.) J.Presl
- Cinnamomum cupulatum Kosterm.
- Cinnamomum curvifolium (Lour.) Nees
- Cinnamomum cuspidatum Miq.
- Cinnamomum damhaense Kosterm. ex Dao
- Cinnamomum daphnoides Siebold & Zucc.
- Cinnamomum decaisnei Lukman.
- Cinnamomum decourtilzii Lukman.
- Cinnamomum degeneri C.K.Allen
- Cinnamomum deschampsii Gamble
- Cinnamomum dimorphandrum Yahara & Tagane
- Cinnamomum doederleinii Engl.
- Cinnamomum dubium Nees
- Cinnamomum ebaloi Kosterm.
- Cinnamomum ellipticifolium Kosterm.
- Cinnamomum englerianum Schewe
- Cinnamomum eugenoliferum Kosterm.
- Cinnamomum filipedicellatum Kosterm.
- Cinnamomum fitianum (Meisn.) A.C.Sm.
- Cinnamomum frodinii Kosterm.
- Cinnamomum gamblei Geethakum., Deepu & Pandur.
- Cinnamomum gaudichaudii Lukman.
- Cinnamomum glauciphyllum Kosterm.
- Cinnamomum goaense Kosterm.
- Cinnamomum gracillimum Kosterm.
- Cinnamomum grandiflorum Kosterm.
- Cinnamomum guizhouense C.Y.Deng, Zhi Yang & Y.Yang
- Cinnamomum helferi Lukman.
- Cinnamomum heyneanum Nees
- Cinnamomum hkinlumense Kosterm.
- Cinnamomum hookeri Lukman.
- Cinnamomum impressinervium Meisn.
- Cinnamomum inconspicuum Kosterm. ex de Kok
- Cinnamomum iners (Reinw. ex Nees & T.Nees) Blume
- Cinnamomum insularimontanum Hayata
- Cinnamomum javanicum Blume
- Cinnamomum jensenianum Hand.-Mazz.
- Cinnamomum kalbaricum Doweld
- Cinnamomum kami Kosterm.
- Cinnamomum keralaense Kosterm.
- Cinnamomum kerangas Kosterm.
- Cinnamomum kerrii Kosterm.
- Cinnamomum kinabaluense Heine
- Cinnamomum kingdon-wardii Kosterm.
- Cinnamomum kostermansii de Kok
- Cinnamomum kotoense Kaneh. & Sasaki
- Cinnamomum kunstleri Ridl.
- Cinnamomum kwangtungense Merr.
- Cinnamomum lanaoense Kosterm.
- Cinnamomum lanuginosum Kosterm.
- Cinnamomum laubatii F.Muell.
- Cinnamomum lawang Kosterm.
- Cinnamomum ledermannii Schewe
- Cinnamomum liangii C.K.Allen
- Cinnamomum ligneum Lukman.
- Cinnamomum lineatum Kosterm.
- Cinnamomum lioui C.K.Allen
- Cinnamomum litsaeifolium Thwaites
- Cinnamomum loheri Merr.
- Cinnamomum lohitensis M.Gangop.
- Cinnamomum longipedicellatum Kosterm.
- Cinnamomum longipetiolatum H.W.Li
- Cinnamomum loureiroi Nees
- Cinnamomum lucens Miq.
- Cinnamomum mabberleyi de Kok
- Cinnamomum macrocarpum Hook.f.
- Cinnamomum macrophyllum Miq.
- Cinnamomum mairei H.Lév.
- Cinnamomum malabatrum (Burm.f.) J.Presl
- Cinnamomum melliodorum Kosterm.
- Cinnamomum mendozae Kosterm.
- Cinnamomum mercadoi S.Vidal
- Cinnamomum microphyllum Ridl.
- Cinnamomum mohanense Gangapr., S.P.Mathew & R.Jagad.
- Cinnamomum mollissimum Hook.f.
- Cinnamomum myrianthum Merr.
- Cinnamomum nalingway Kosterm.
- Cinnamomum nanophyllum Kosterm.
- Cinnamomum neesii Lukman.
- Cinnamomum nilagiricum Geethakum., Pandur. & Deepu
- Cinnamomum novae-britanniae Kosterm.
- Cinnamomum oblongum Kosterm.
- Cinnamomum obscurum Meisn.
- Cinnamomum oliveri F.M.Bailey
- Cinnamomum osmophloeum Kaneh.
- Cinnamomum ovalauense Kosterm.
- Cinnamomum ovalifolium Wight
- Cinnamomum pachypes Kosterm.
- Cinnamomum pachyphyllum Kosterm.
- Cinnamomum paiei Kosterm.
- Cinnamomum pallidum Gillespie
- Cinnamomum panayense Kosterm.
- Cinnamomum paraneuron Miq.
- Cinnamomum pedatinervium Meisn.
- Cinnamomum pendulum Cammerl.
- Cinnamomum percoriaceum Kosterm.
- Cinnamomum perglabrum Kosterm.
- Cinnamomum perrottetii Meisn.
- Cinnamomum petelotii Kosterm. ex de Kok
- Cinnamomum petiolatum Kosterm.
- Cinnamomum pilosum Cammerl.
- Cinnamomum pingbienense H.W.Li
- Cinnamomum piniodorum Schewe
- Cinnamomum pittosporoides Hand.-Mazz.
- Cinnamomum podagricum Kosterm.
- Cinnamomum polderi Kosterm.
- Cinnamomum politum Miq.
- Cinnamomum polyadelphum (Lour.) Kosterm.
- Cinnamomum porphyrospermum Kosterm.
- Cinnamomum propinquum F.M.Bailey
- Cinnamomum pseudopedunculatum Hayata
- Cinnamomum puberulum Ridl.
- Cinnamomum racemosum Kosterm.
- Cinnamomum reticulatum Hayata
- Cinnamomum rhynchophyllum Miq.
- Cinnamomum rigidissimum H.T.Chang
- Cinnamomum rigidum Gillespie
- Cinnamomum riparium Gamble
- Cinnamomum rivulorum Kosterm.
- Cinnamomum rosiflorum Kosterm.
- Cinnamomum rosselianum Kosterm.
- Cinnamomum rumphii Lukman.
- Cinnamomum rupestre Kosterm.
- Cinnamomum sancti-caroli Kosterm.
- Cinnamomum sandkuhlii Merr.
- Cinnamomum sanjappae M.Gangop.
- Cinnamomum saxatile H.W.Li
- Cinnamomum scalarinervium Kosterm. ex Dao
- Cinnamomum scortechinii Gamble
- Cinnamomum selangorense (Ridl.) de Kok
- Cinnamomum sericans Hance
- Cinnamomum sessilifolium Kaneh.
- Cinnamomum siamense Craib
- Cinnamomum sieboldii Meisn.
- Cinnamomum sinharajaense Kosterm.
- Cinnamomum sintoc Blume
- Cinnamomum sleumeri Kosterm.
- Cinnamomum solomonense C.K.Allen
- Cinnamomum splendens Kosterm.
- Cinnamomum spurium Blume ex Lukman.
- Cinnamomum subaveniopsis Kosterm.
- Cinnamomum subavenium Miq.
- Cinnamomum sublanuginosum Kosterm.
- Cinnamomum subsericeum Kosterm.
- Cinnamomum subtetrapterum Miq.
- Cinnamomum sulavesianum Kosterm.
- Cinnamomum sulphuratum Nees
- Cinnamomum sumatranum Meisn.
- Cinnamomum suvrae M.Gangop.
- Cinnamomum szechuanense Yen C.Yang
- Cinnamomum tahijanum Kosterm.
- Cinnamomum talawaense Kosterm.
- Cinnamomum tamala (Buch.-Ham.) T.Nees & C.H.Eberm.
- Cinnamomum tavoyanum Meisn.
- Cinnamomum tazia (Buch.-Ham.) Kosterm. ex M.Gangop.
- Cinnamomum tetragonum A.Chev.
- Cinnamomum thailandicum (Kosterm.) de Kok
- Cinnamomum travancoricum Gamble
- Cinnamomum trichophyllum Quisumb. & Merr.
- Cinnamomum trinervatum Yen C.Yang
- Cinnamomum trintaense Kosterm.
- Cinnamomum tsangii Merr.
- Cinnamomum tsoi C.K.Allen
- Cinnamomum utile Kosterm.
- Cinnamomum vacciniifolium Kosterm.
- Cinnamomum validinerve Hance
- Cinnamomum verum J.Presl
- Cinnamomum villosulum S.Lee & F.N.Wei
- Cinnamomum vimineum Nees
- Cinnamomum virens R.T.Baker
- Cinnamomum vitiense Kosterm.
- Cinnamomum walaiwarense Kosterm.
- Cinnamomum wightii Meisn.
- Cinnamomum wilsonii Gamble
- Cinnamomum woulfei Kosterm.
- Cinnamomum xanthoneurum Blume

Species transferred to Camphora:

- Camphora bodinieri ≡ Cinnamomum bodinieri
- Camphora brachythyrsa ≡ Cinnamomum brachythyrsum
- Camphora chartophylla ≡ Cinnamomum chartophyllum
- Camphora foveolata ≡ Cinnamomum foveolatum
- Camphora glandulifera ≡ Cinnamomum glanduliferum
- Camphora illicioides ≡ Cinnamomum ilicioides
- Camphora longepaniculata ≡ Cinnamomum longepaniculatum
- Camphora micrantha ≡ Cinnamomum micranthum
- Camphora migao ≡ Cinnamomum migao
- Camphora mollifolia ≡ Cinnamomum mollifolium
- Camphora officinarum ≡ Cinnamomum camphora
- Camphora parthenoxylon ≡ Cinnamomum parthenoxylon
- Camphora philippinensis ≡ Cinnamomum philippinense
- Camphora platyphylla ≡ Cinnamomum platyphyllum
- Camphora purpurea ≡ Cinnamomum purpureum
- Camphora rufotomentosa ≡ Cinnamomum rufomentosum
- Camphora septentrionalis ≡ Cinnamomum septentrionale
- Camphora tenuipilis ≡ Cinnamomum tenuipile

== Gallery ==
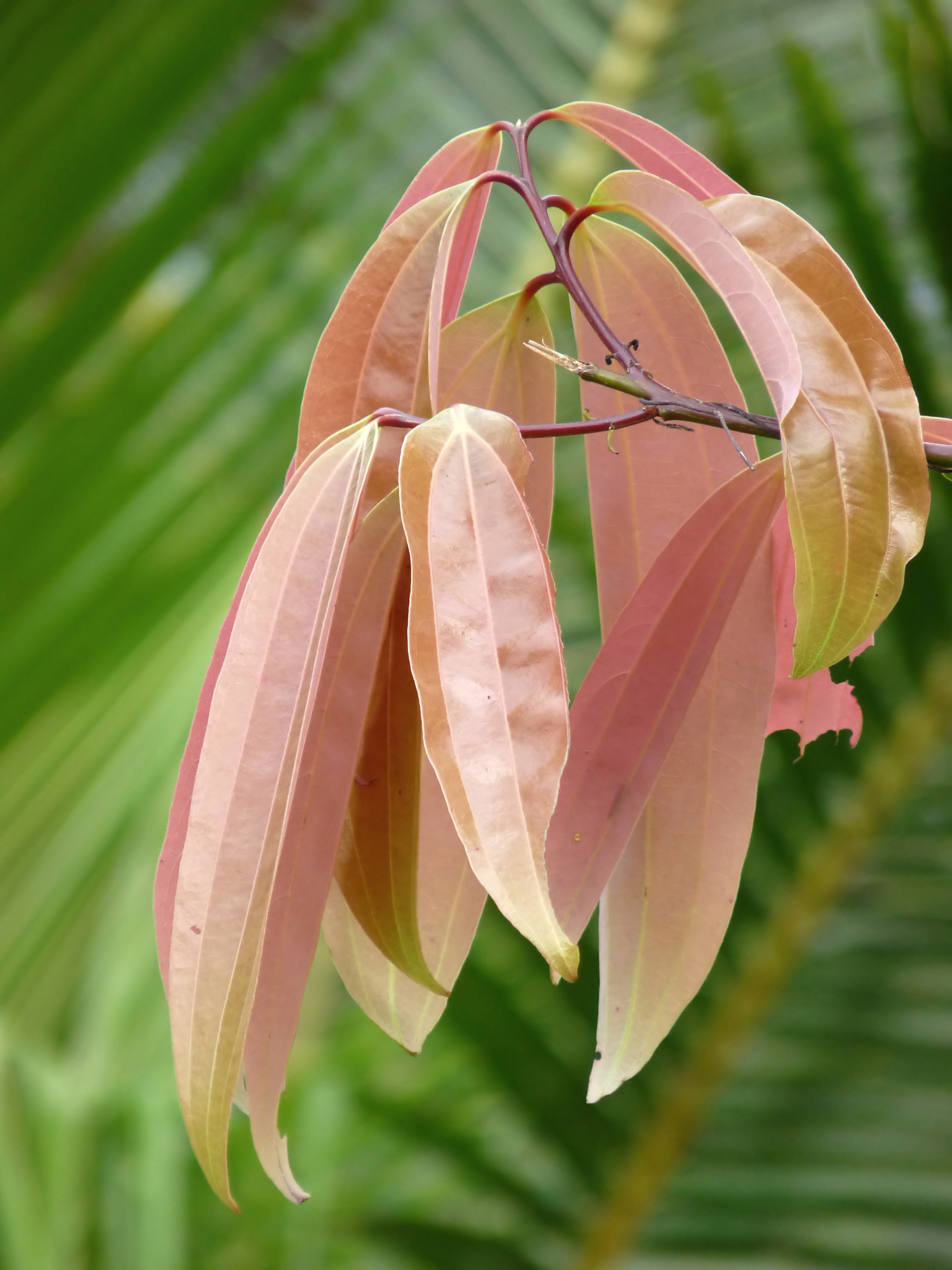
Cinnamomum malabatrum, young leaves, Kerala, India

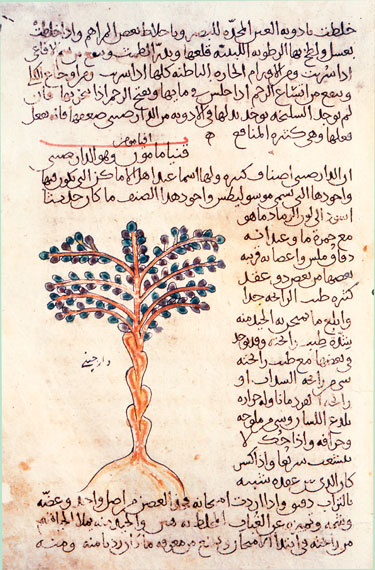
Cinnamomum tree in a 10th-century Arabic manuscript

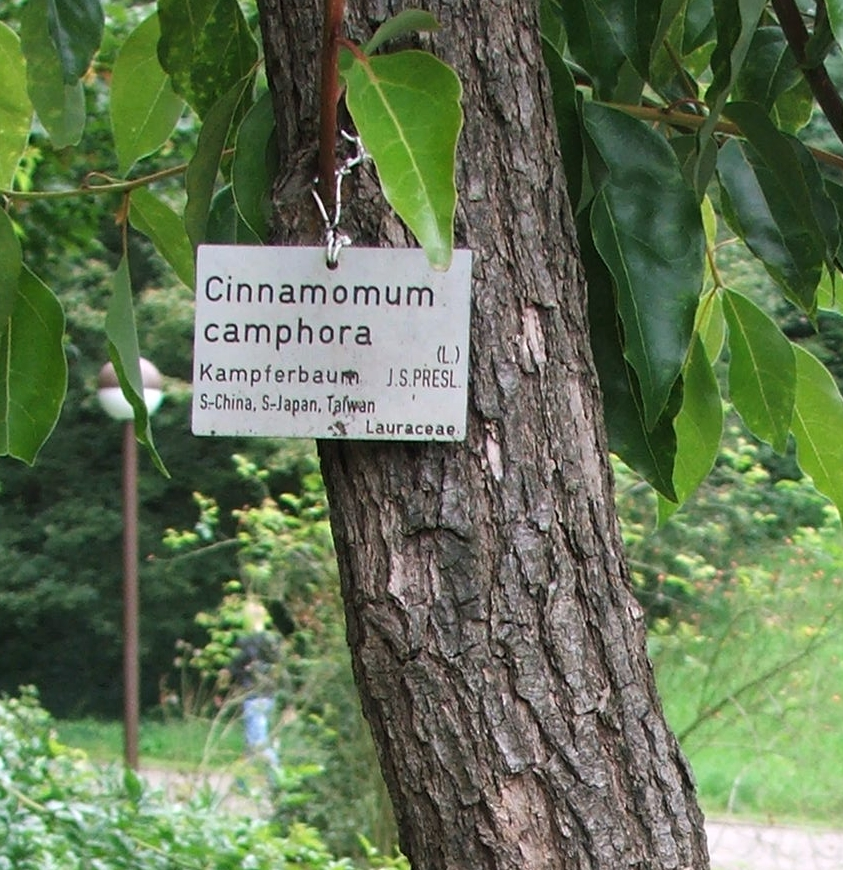
Bark of Cinnamomum camphora

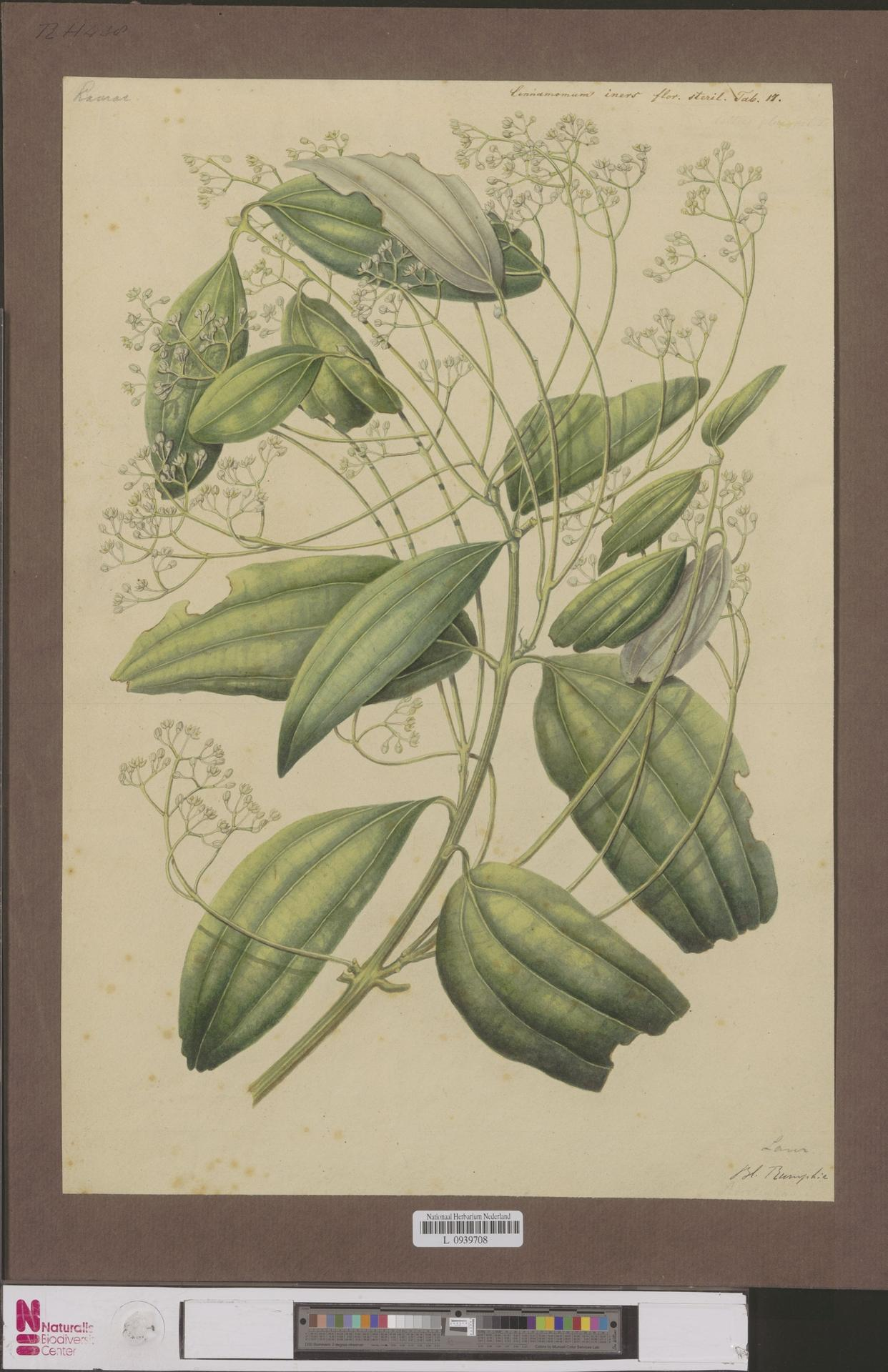
Drawing of Cinnamomum iners by J.C.P. Arckenhausen, ~1835

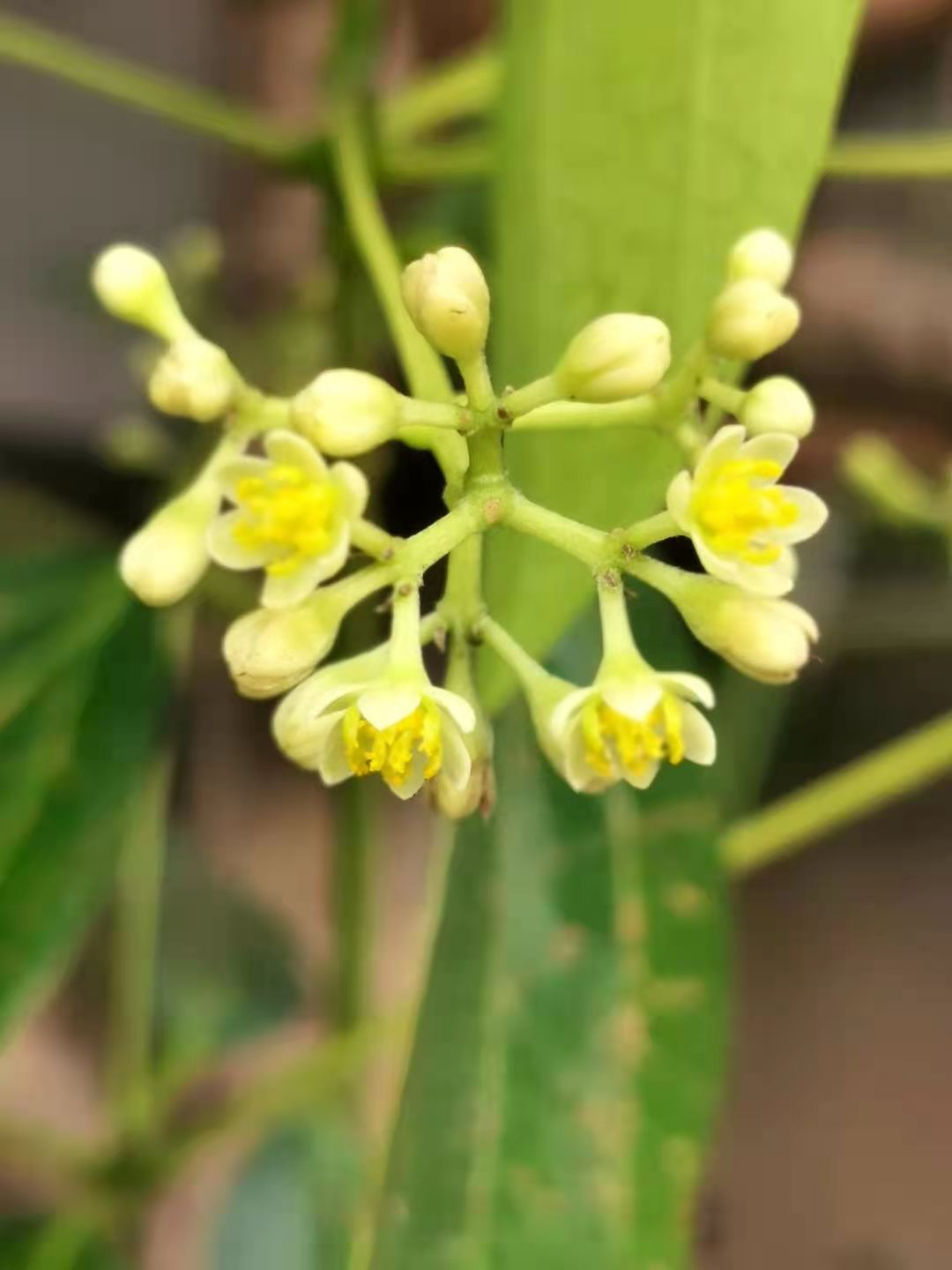
Cinnamomum kotoense inflorescence
