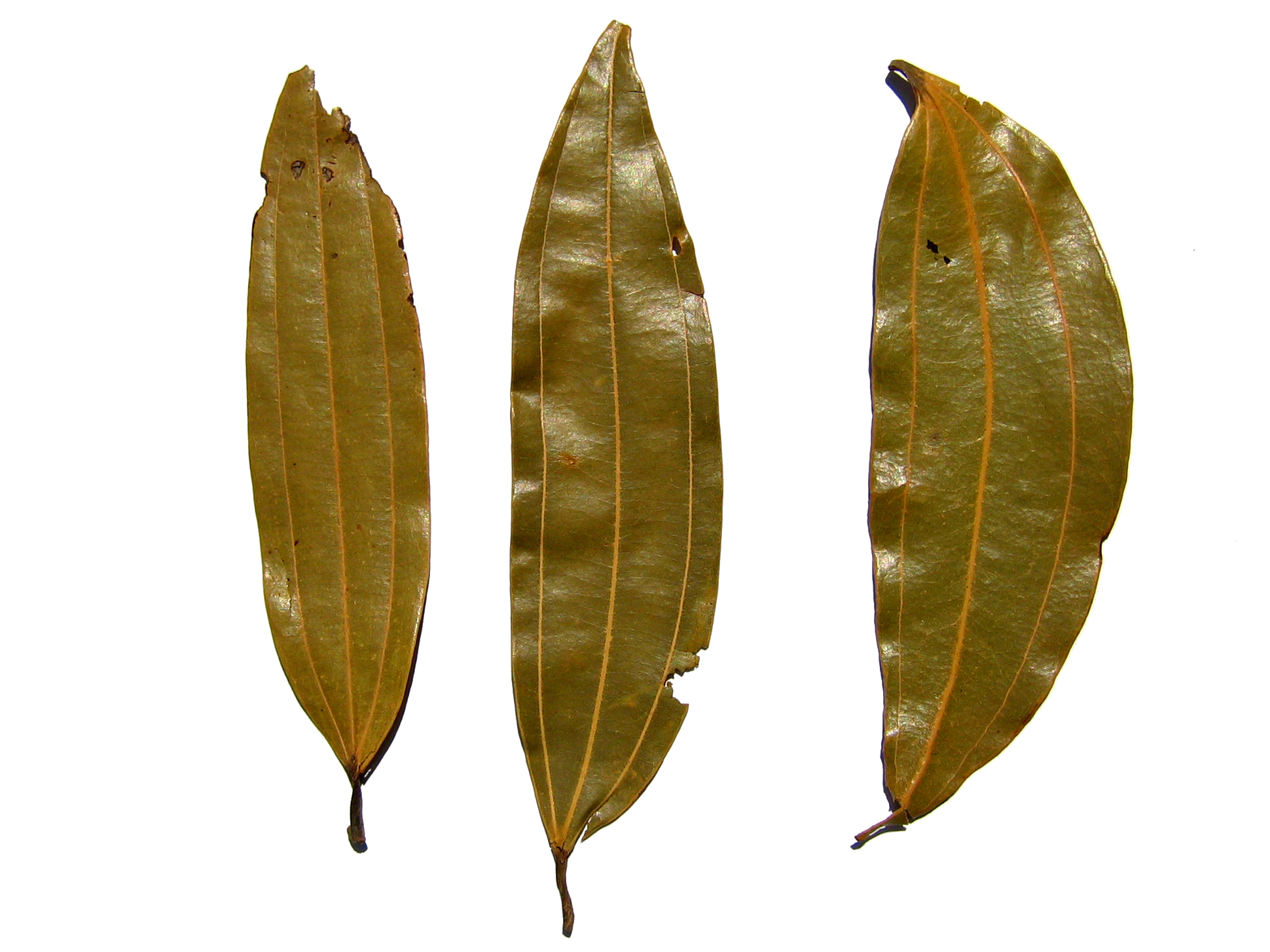
- Semi-dried Indian bay leaves

Conservation status
- Least Concern (IUCN 3.1)

Scientific classification
- Kingdom: Plantae
- Clade: Tracheophytes
- Clade: Angiosperms
- Clade: Magnoliids
- Order: Laurales
- Family: Lauraceae
- Genus: Cinnamomum
- Species: C. tamala

Binomial name
- Cinnamomum tamala (Buch.-Ham.) T.Nees & C.H.Eberm.

Synonyms
- Cinnamomum albiflorum Nees; Cinnamomum lindleyi Lukman.; Cinnamomum reinwardtii Nees; Cinnamomum tamala var. albiflorum (Nees) Meisn.; Cinnamomum tamala var. elliptifolium Baruah & S.C.Nath; Cinnamomum veitchii Lukman.; Cinnamomum zwartzii Lukman.; Laurus albiflora Wall.; Laurus cassia Roxb.; Laurus culilawan Reinw. ex Meisn.; Laurus sailyana Buch.-Ham.; Laurus soilyana Buch.-Ham. ex Wall.; Laurus triplinervia Reinw. ex Nees; Laurus tamala Buch.-Ham.; Persea tamala Spreng.

= Cinnamomum tamala =

Indian bay leaf

Species of tree

Cinnamomum tamala, Indian bay leaf, tejpat or tejapatta, Malabar leaf, Indian bark, Indian cassia, or malabathrum, is a tree in the family Lauraceae that is native to northern India (Assam and the Western Himalayas), Bangladesh, Nepal, Myanmar, Laos, Vietnam, and southwestern China. It can grow up to 20 m (66 ft) tall. Its leaves have a clove-like aroma with a hint of peppery taste; they are used for culinary purposes (extensively in the cuisines of India, Nepal, and Bhutan, particularly in the Mughlai cuisine of North India and Nepal and in tsheringma herbal tea in Bhutan) and medicinal purposes.

It is thought to have been one of the major sources of the medicinal plant leaves known in classic and medieval times as malabathrum (or malobathrum).

== Names ==
Tejpat and tejpatta are Sanskritic (from तेजपत्ता tējapattā "invigorating leaf") via Hindi tejpattā and tejpāt (तेजपात/তেজপাত) in Nepali, Maithili, and Assamese; tejpātā (তেজপাতা) in Bengali and tejåpåtrå/tejåpåtårå (ତେଜପତ୍ର/ତେଜପତର) in Odia.

The word "malabathrum" is thought to be derived from a Greek rebracketing of Sanskrit तमालपत्त्रम् tamālapattram literally "dark tree leaves" (cognate to તમલપત્ર tamalpatra in Gujarati and तमालपत्र tamālpatra in Marathi).

The Lepcha of Sikkim call them naap saor koong. Other names include vazhanayila/edanayila (വഴനയില/എടനഇല) in Malayalam, kaḍu dhālchini (ಕಾಡು ದಾಲ್ಚಿನ್ನಿ) in Kannada. They are called biryāni āku/baghāra āku (బిర్యానీ ఆకు/బగార ఆకు) in Telugu.

== Characteristics and use ==
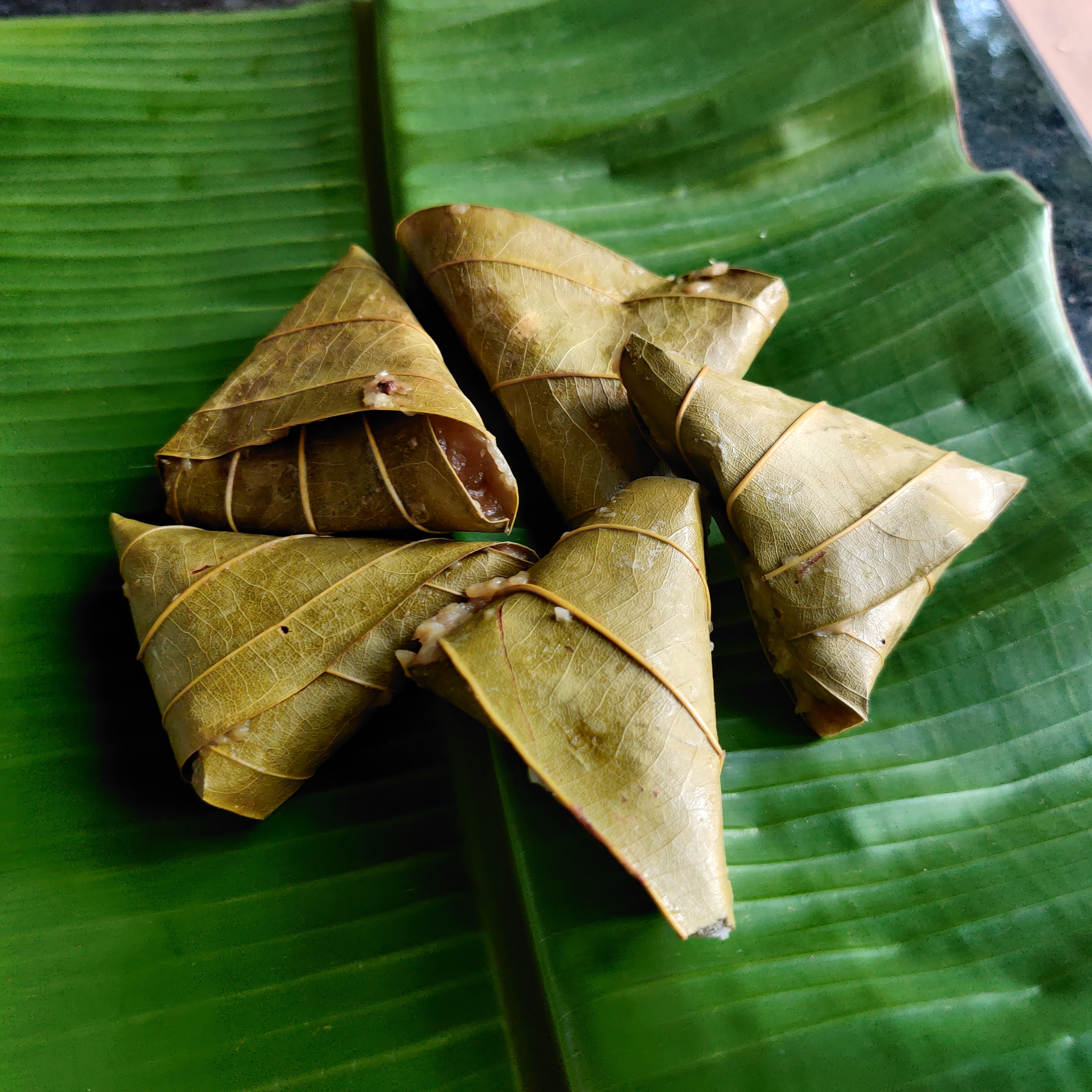
Kumbilappam wrapped in Indian bay leaf

They are often used in kumbilappam or chakka-ada (ചക്ക അട), an authentic sweet from Kerala, infusing their characteristic flavor to the dumplings.

English-language marketplaces often label tejapatta as "Indian bay leaves" or just "bay leaf", causing confusion with the leaf from the botanically and aromatically different Mediterranean bay laurel (Laurus nobilis). Bay laurel leaves are shorter and light- to medium-green in color, with one large vein down the length of the leaf, while tej leaves are about twice as long and wider, usually olive green in color, with three veins down the length of the leaf. There are five types or grades of teja leaves that grant various strong cassia- or cinnamon-like aroma profiles to dishes, while the bay laurel leaf's aroma is more reminiscent of pine and lemon.

Tejpat bark is sometimes used for cooking akin to cinnamon, although it is regarded as inferior to true cinnamon or cassia.

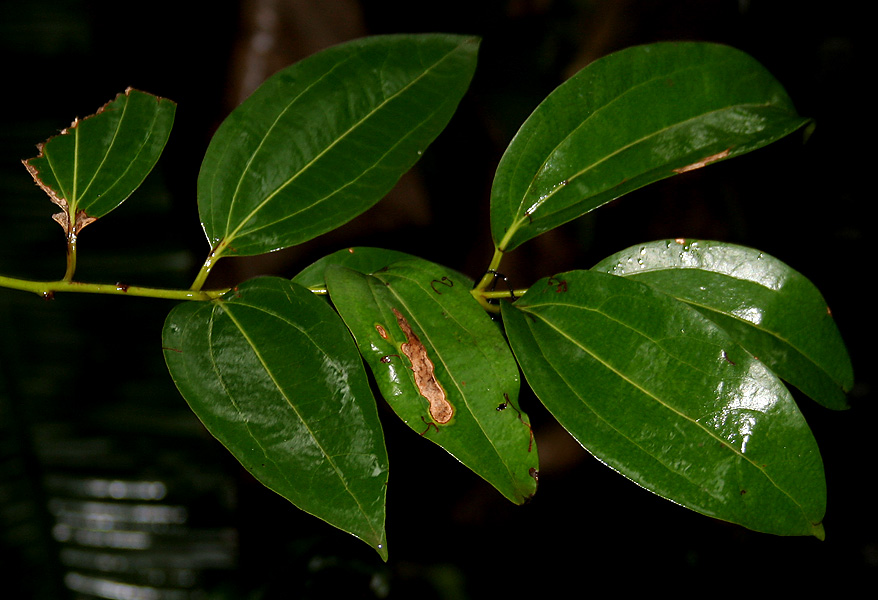
Leaves in Goa

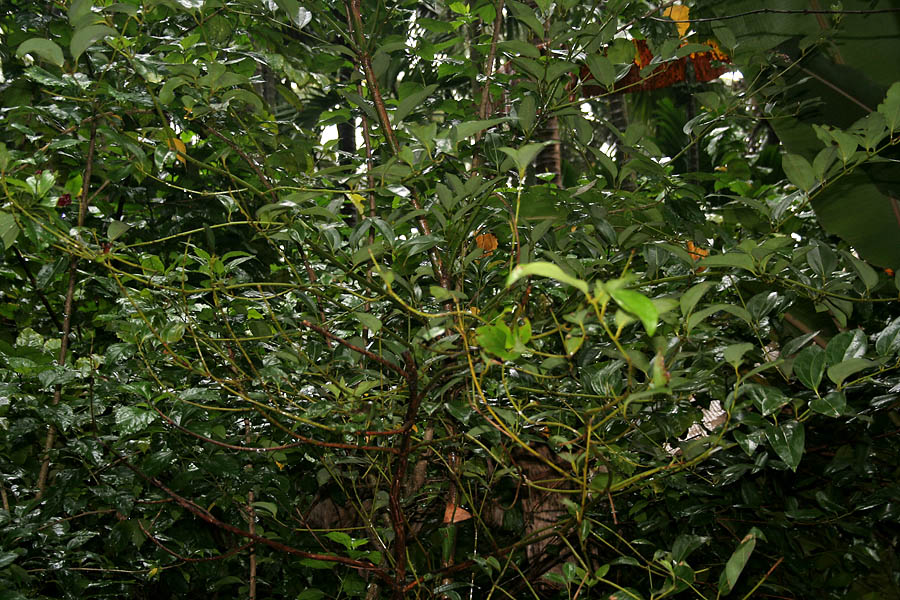
Tree in Goa

== Aroma attributes ==
- Beta-caryophyllene
- Linalool
- Caryophyllene oxide
- Eugenol

== Related species ==
- Cassia
- Cinnamon
- Saigon cinnamon
