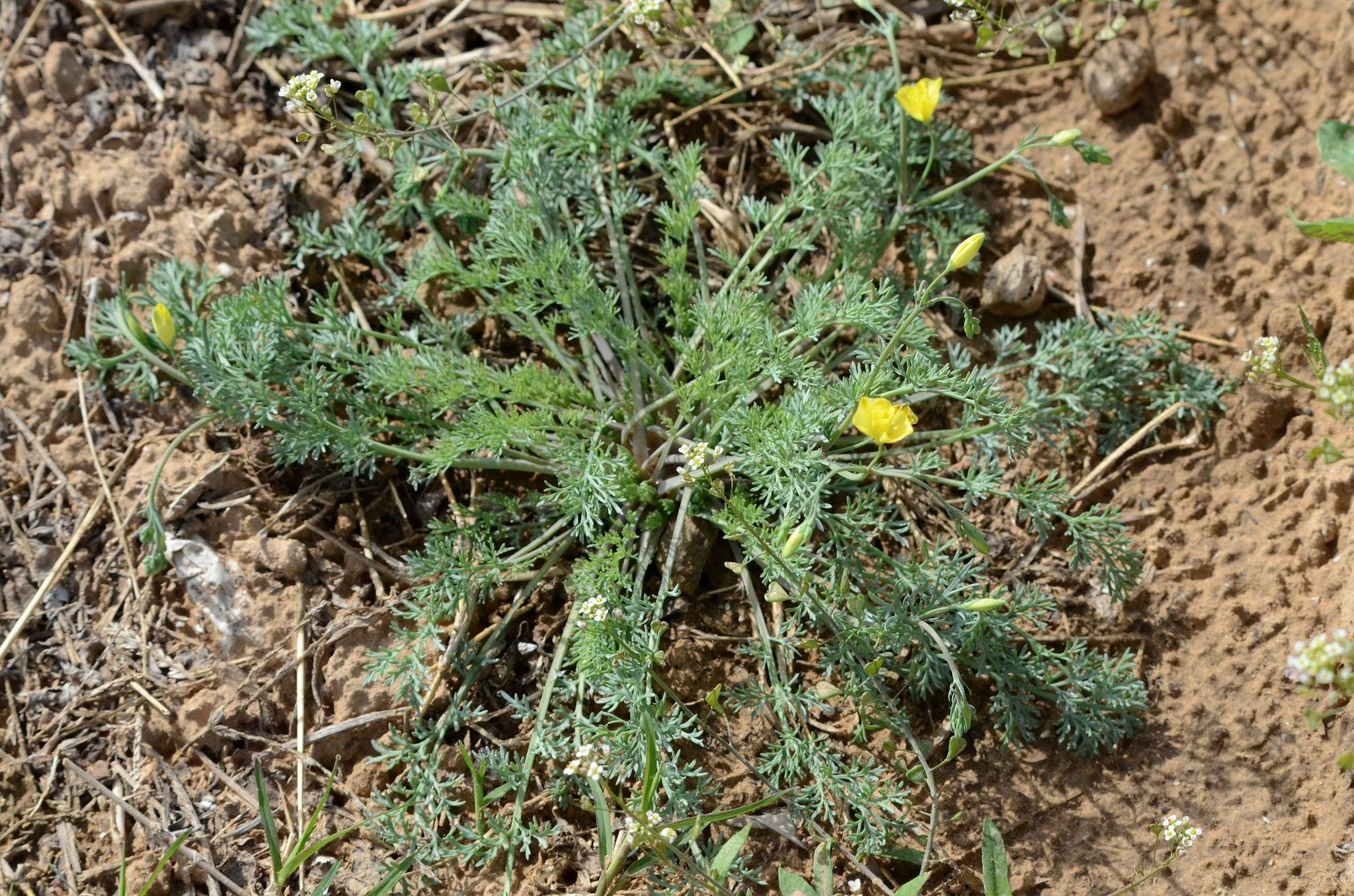

Scientific classification
- Kingdom: Plantae
- Clade: Tracheophytes
- Clade: Angiosperms
- Clade: Eudicots
- Order: Ranunculales
- Family: Papaveraceae
- Genus: Hypecoum
- Section: Hypecoum sect. Chiazospermum
- Species: H. erectum

Binomial name
- Hypecoum erectum L.

Synonyms
- Chiazospermum erectum (L.) Bernh.; Hypecoum millefolium H.Lév. & Vaniot

= Hypecoum erectum =

Species of annual herb

Hypecoum erectum is a species of annual herb in the poppy family native to China, Mongolia, and Russia. In China, the plant is commonly called 角茴香 (Jiǎo huíxiāng).

== Description ==
The species is a winter-blooming annual herb. It has a great number of grey-green leaves, which are connected to the stem by a 1–3 cm long petiole. The leaf blade is roughly lance-shaped, measuring 4–11 cm long and less than 2.5 cm wide. Two or three leaflets branch out from a blade which are linear or bristle-like and 1–3 mm long. There are up to 20 flowering stalks from the central rosette which eventually bear many flowers. The first flower usually grows 5–15 cm from the base of the stalk. The bracts are paired, and gradually get smaller the further up the flowering stalk they are. The sepals are around 2 mm long and oval shaped, remaining on the plant once they develop. The petals are yellow but can sometimes have dark spots or streaks. There are around 30–40 blackish seeds that are rectangular in shape and around 1 mm long.

The plant flowers and fruits from April to October.

=== Phytochemistry ===
The primary chemical constituents of H. erectum are hypecorine, hypecorinine, hyperectine, protopine, coptyine, allocryptopine, isohyperectine, and oxohydrastine. There is a greater concentration of these constituents in the aerial parts of the plant than underground. Several of the chemicals in H. erectum (especially hypecorinine, protopine, and allocryptonine) were shown to have in vitro antimicrobial properties.

== Taxonomy ==
Hypecoum erectum was first formally described by Carl Linnaeus in his 1753 book Species Plantarum. In it, he combined the two previous records of "Hypecoum siliquis erectis teretibus torulosis" and "Hypecoum tenuifolium siliquis erectis teretibus," which named the plant after its smooth and erect pods, into one species that followed his binomial nomenclature. Linnaeus also noted the species was found in "Dauria", referring to Dauriya in China or Transbaikal in Russia.

In 1833, Johann Jakob Bernhardi split the genus Chiazospermum from Hypecoum in his book Linnaea. In a later volume, he followed Augustin Pyramus de Candolle's observations of the differences between plants in Chiazospermum and Hypecoum and moved H. erectum into the former genus because of differences in its flower structure, creating the new combination Chiazospermum erectum. However, the new genus was not widely accepted, and in 1990 it was relegated to subgeneric status beneath Hypecoum. Thus, the original name Hypecoum erectum was restored and the plant became the type species of section Chiazospermum and subgenus Chiazospermum.

Specimens of Hypecoum erectum were misidentified by Hector Léveillé and Eugène Vaniot after their 1905 expedition to China. Léveillé and Vaniot authored the invalid name Hypecoum millefolium in reference to the "thousand leaves" of the plant.

== Distribution and habitat ==
In Russia, the plant is found in Altai, Buryatia, Chita, Irkutsk, Krasnoyarsk, Tuva, and West Siberia. In China, it is found in Inner Mongolia, Xinjiang, and the North-Central and South-Central regions. It can also be found in Mongolia proper. It typically grows at altitudes of 400–1,200 m (1,300–3,900 ft) on slopes, grassy areas, riversides, and sandy gravel.
