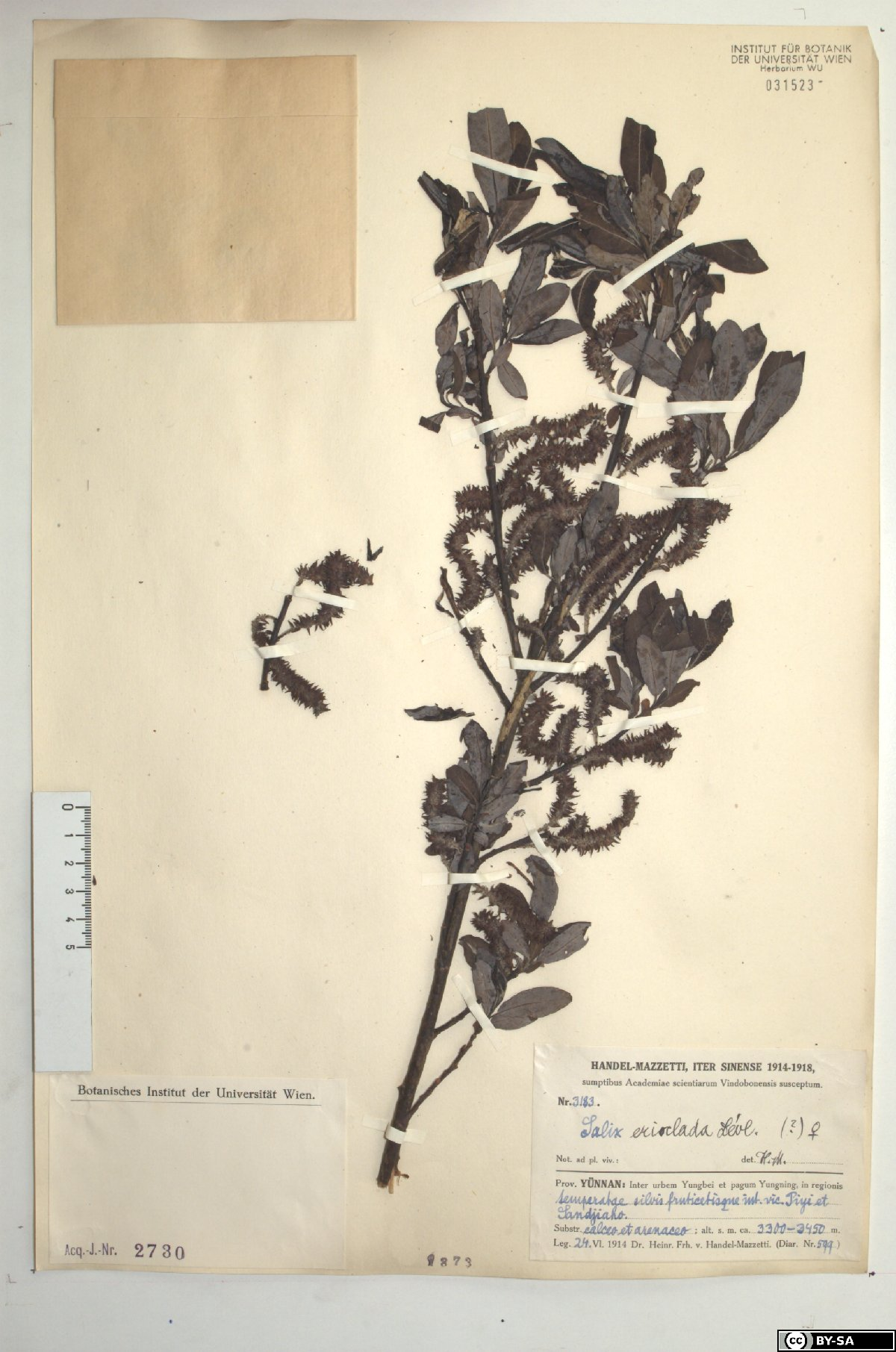

Conservation status
- Least Concern (IUCN 3.1)

Scientific classification
- Kingdom: Plantae
- Clade: Tracheophytes
- Clade: Angiosperms
- Clade: Eudicots
- Clade: Rosids
- Order: Malpighiales
- Family: Salicaceae
- Genus: Salix
- Species: S. erioclada

Binomial name
- Salix erioclada H. Lév. & Vaniot

= Salix erioclada =

Plant in the genus of willows

Salix erioclada is a species from the genus of willows (Salix) and grows as a shrub or small tree. The leaf blades have a length of about 5 centimeters. The natural range of the species is in China.

== Description ==
Salix erioclada grows as a shrub or small tree. Young twigs are reddish chestnut brown or yellow, densely hairy and fluffy and bald. The leaves have a short petiole. The leaf blade is ovate-elliptical to elliptical, about 5 inches long and 1.5 inches wide. The leaf margin is entire, the leaf base narrowly rounded or wedge-shaped, the leaf end pointed. The upper side of the leaf is dull green, the underside is frosted or glaucous, hairy down and balding. Young leaves are rolled up, covered with a silky, downy hair, white felt underneath and the end is blunt or rounded. Seven to twelve lateral pairs of nerves are formed per leaf.

The male inflorescences are from 2.5 and usually 6 centimeters long and 6 to 7 millimeters in diameter, narrow cylindrical catkins. The peduncle is about 1.5 inches long and has two or three small leaves. The inflorescence axis is hairy down. The bracts are yellowish green, obovate, silky shaggy hairy, almost bare underneath and about half as long as the stamens. Male flowers have entire or divided adaxial and abaxial nectar glands. There will be two stamensformed with free-standing stamens with downy hair at the base. The anthers are small, round and yellow. The female catkins are 3 to 6 centimeters long with a diameter of 4 to 6 millimeters. The bracts are yellowish green (dry brown), elliptical, about 2 millimeters long, densely and long silky hairy. Female flowers have an adaxial nectar gland. The ovary is short stalked ovate to narrowly ovate, silky shaggy haired, sitting or. The stylus is split and has about one third the length of the ovary. The scar is bilobed. The fruits are narrowly ovate to ovate-conical, 4 to 6 millimeters long and almost bare capsules. Salix erioclada flowers in April before or with the leaf shoots, the fruits ripen in May.

== Range ==
The natural range is in the Chinese provinces of Hubei, Hunan, Qinghai, Shaanxi, and Sichuan. There the species grows in forest edges on mountain slopes and in swamp areas at altitudes of 600 to 1800 meters.

== Taxonomy ==
Salix erioclada is a kind from the kind of willow (Salix), in the family of the pasture plants (Salicaceae). There, it is the section Eriocladae assigned. It was first described scientifically in 1906 by Hector Léveillé and Eugène Vaniot in repertory specierum Novarum Regni Vegetabilis. Synonyms of the species are not known.
