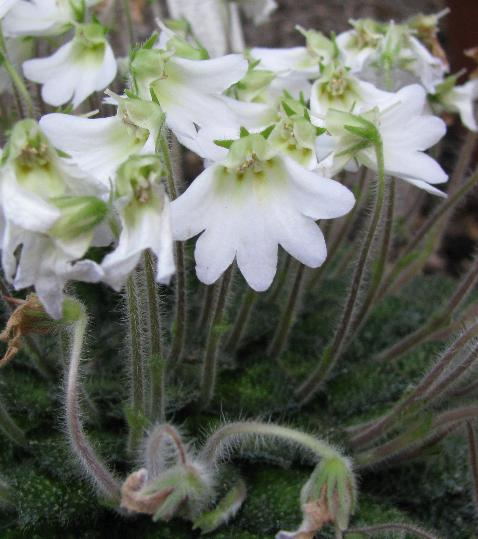
- Petrocosmea rosettifolia

Scientific classification
- Kingdom: Plantae
- Clade: Tracheophytes
- Clade: Angiosperms
- Clade: Eudicots
- Clade: Asterids
- Order: Lamiales
- Family: Gesneriaceae
- Subfamily: Didymocarpoideae
- Genus: Petrocosmea; Oliv. (1887)

Species
- 63; see text

Synonyms
- Vaniotia H.Lév. (1903)

= Petrocosmea =

Genus of flowering plants

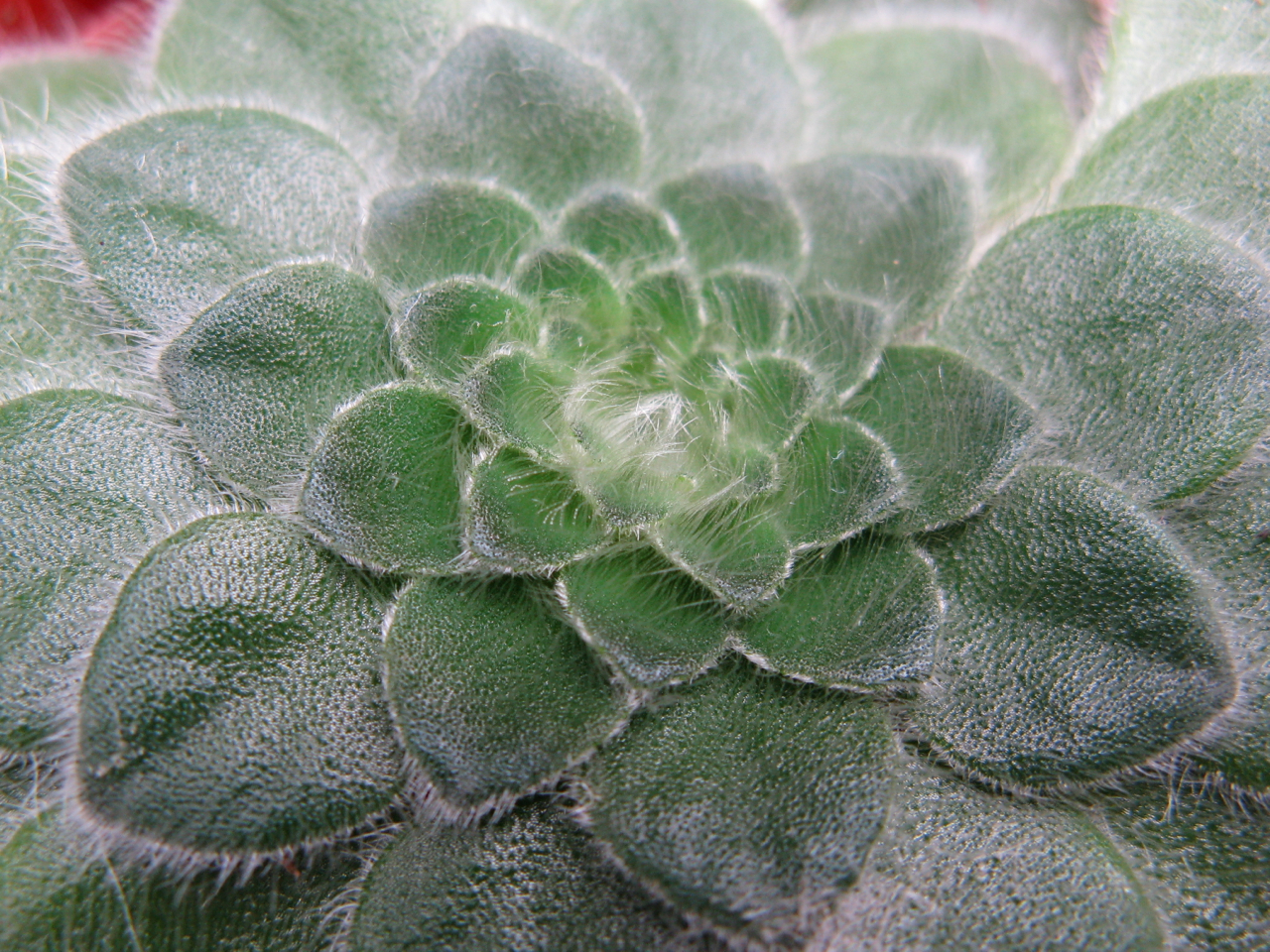
Petrocosmea forrestii, leaf rosette

Petrocosmea is a genus of the family Gesneriaceae, the African violet family. Many of the species within this genus are endemic to high-elevation areas in Western China, although some are native to other parts of Asia. including north-central and southern China, Indochina, and the eastern Himalayas. It is a rosette-forming genus that generally grows on wet mossy rocks or forests.

The genus was discovered in China by Augustine Henry and was first described in 1887 by Daniel Oliver (Prof. of Botany, University College, London).

== Species ==
63 species are accepted.

- Petrocosmea adenophora Z.J.Huang & Z.B.Xin
- Petrocosmea barbata Craib
- Petrocosmea begoniifolia C.Y. Wu ex H.W. Li
- Petrocosmea bicolor D.J.Middleton & Triboun
- Petrocosmea cavaleriei H. Lév.
- Petrocosmea chiwui M.Q.Han, H.Jiang & Yan Liu
- Petrocosmea chrysotricha M.Q.Han, H.Jiang & Yan Liu
- Petrocosmea coerulea C.Y. Wu ex W.T. Wang
- Petrocosmea condorensis Pellegr.
- Petrocosmea confluens W.T. Wang
- Petrocosmea cryptica J.M.H.Shaw
- Petrocosmea dejiangensis Sheng H.Tang & Jian Xu
- Petrocosmea duclouxii Craib
- Petrocosmea duyunensis Sheng H.Tang
- Petrocosmea flaccida Craib
- Petrocosmea formosa B.L.Burtt
- Petrocosmea forrestii Craib
- Petrocosmea funingensis Zhang, Pan, Meng, Li, Xu & Li
- Petrocosmea getuheensis X.X.Bai, Y.L.Zhou & Xing C.Li
- Petrocosmea grandiflora Hemsl.
- Petrocosmea grandifolia W.T. Wang
- Petrocosmea heterophylla B.L.Burtt
- Petrocosmea hexiensis S.Z.Zhang & Z.Y.Liu
- Petrocosmea hsiwenii Lei Cai, J.D.Ya & J.Cai
- Petrocosmea huanjiangensis Yan Liu & W.B.Xu
- Petrocosmea iodioides Hemsl.
- Petrocosmea kerrii Craib (including Petrocosmea wardii W.W. Sm.)
- Petrocosmea kingii (C.B.Clarke) Chatterjee
- Petrocosmea leiandra (W.T.Wang) Z.J.Qiu
- Petrocosmea × longianthera Z.J.Qiu & Yin Z.Wang
- Petrocosmea longipedicellata W.T. Wang
- Petrocosmea magnifica M.Q.Han & Yan Liu
- Petrocosmea mairei H. Lév.
- Petrocosmea martini (H. Lév.) H. Lév.
- Petrocosmea melanophthalma Huan C.Wang, Z.R.He & Li Bing Zhang
- Petrocosmea menglianensis H.W. Li
- Petrocosmea minor Hemsl. (syn. Petrocosmea henryi Craib)
- Petrocosmea nanchuanensis Z.Y.Liu, Z.Y.Li & Z.J.Qiu
- Petrocosmea nervosa Craib
- Petrocosmea oblata Craib (including Petrocosmea latisepala W.T. Wang)
- Petrocosmea panzhouensis Sheng H.Tang & T.Peng
- Petrocosmea parryorum C.E.C.Fisch.
- Petrocosmea pubescens D.J.Middleton & Triboun
- Petrocosmea purpureomaculata M.Q.Han, J.Cai & J.D.Ya
- Petrocosmea qinlingensis W.T. Wang
- Petrocosmea qiruniae M.Q.Han, Li Bing Zhang & Yan Liu
- Petrocosmea rhombifolia Y.H.Tan & H.B.Ding
- Petrocosmea rosettifolia C.Y. Wu ex H.W.Li
- Petrocosmea rotundifolia M.Q.Han, H.Jiang & Yan Liu
- Petrocosmea sericea C.Y.Wu ex H.W.Li
- Petrocosmea shilinensis Y.M.Shui & H.T.Zhao
- Petrocosmea sichuanensis Chun ex W.T.Wang
- Petrocosmea sinensis Oliv.
- Petrocosmea sinousfolia Z.J.Qiu
- Petrocosmea thermopuncta J.M.H.Shaw
- Petrocosmea tsaii Y.H.Tan & Jian W.Li
- Petrocosmea umbelliformis B.L.Burtt
- Petrocosmea villosa D.J.Middleton
- Petrocosmea viridis M.Q.Han & Yan Liu
- Petrocosmea weiyigangii F.Wen
- Petrocosmea wui M.Q.Han, J.Cai & J.D.Ya
- Petrocosmea xanthomaculata G.Q.Gou & X.Yu Wang
- Petrocosmea xingyiensis Y.G.Wei & F.Wen
- Petrocosmea yanshanensis Z.J.Qiu & Yin Z.Wang
