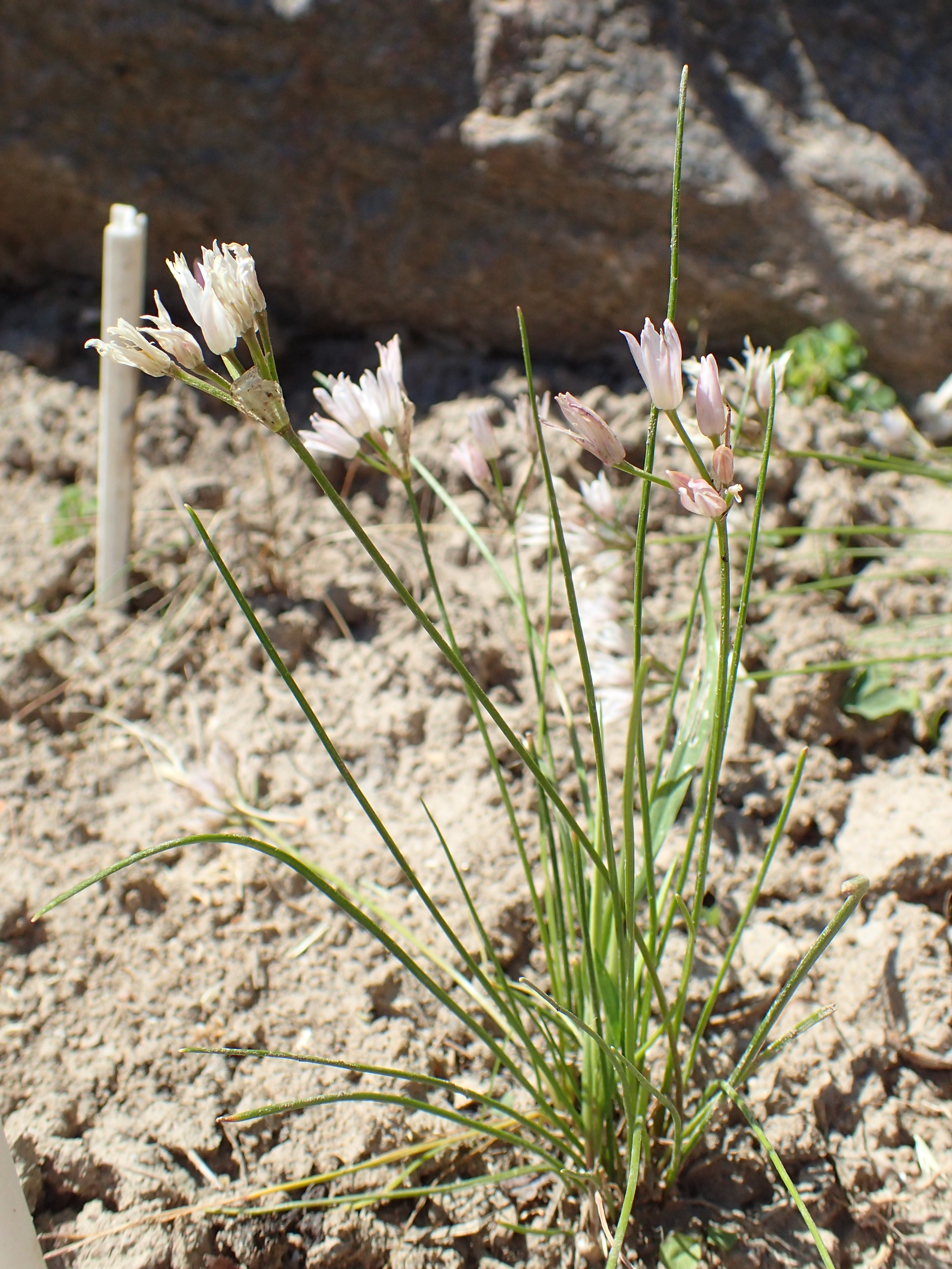
- Allium mairei in the UMCS Botanical Garden in Lublin

Scientific classification
- Kingdom: Plantae
- Clade: Tracheophytes
- Clade: Angiosperms
- Clade: Monocots
- Order: Asparagales
- Family: Amaryllidaceae
- Subfamily: Allioideae
- Genus: Allium
- Subgenus: A. subg. Cyathophora
- Species: A. mairei

Binomial name
- Allium mairei H. Lév.

Synonyms
- Allium amabile Stapf; Allium giraudiasii H.Lév.; Allium pyrrhorrhizum Airy Shaw; Allium pyrrhorrhizum var. leucorrhizum F.T. Wang & T. Tang; Allium yunnanense Diels

= Allium mairei =

Species of plant

Allium mairei is an Asian species of wild onion in the Amaryllis family. It is native to Sichuan, Tibet, Yunnan, Myanmar, and Arunachal Pradesh.

Allium mairei produces clusters of thin bulbs. Scapes are up to 40 cm tall, sometimes 2 from the same plant. Leaves are usually a bit shorter than the scape. Flowers are pale red or reddish-purple. It grows in meadows, forests, and rock crevices.
