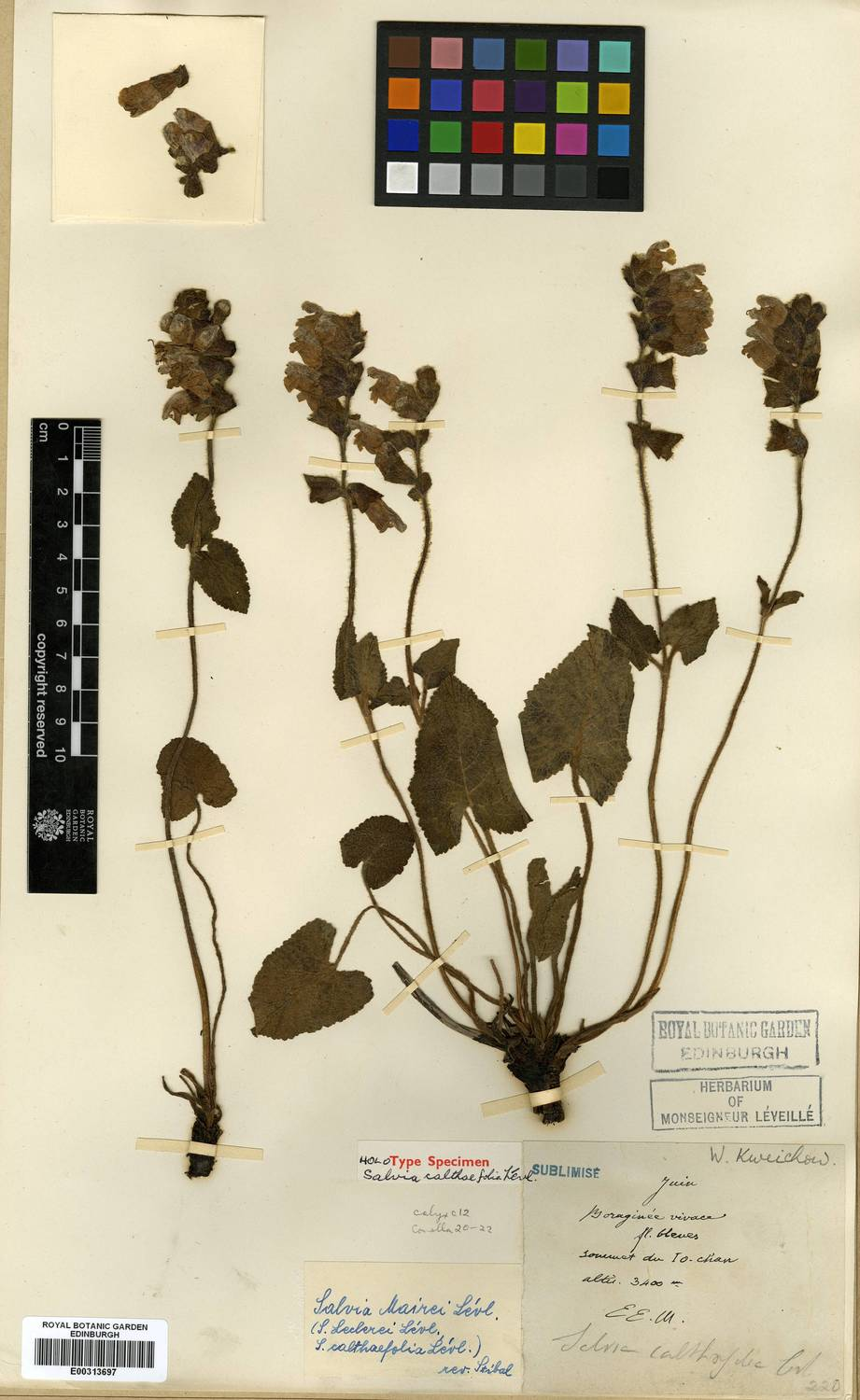

Scientific classification
- Kingdom: Plantae
- Clade: Tracheophytes
- Clade: Angiosperms
- Clade: Eudicots
- Clade: Asterids
- Order: Lamiales
- Family: Lamiaceae
- Genus: Salvia
- Species: S. mairei

Binomial name
- Salvia mairei H.Lév.

= Salvia mairei =

Species of flowering plant

Salvia mairei (Dongchuan sage) is a perennial plant that is native to Yunnan province in China. The plant grows on one to a few stems from 20 to 40 cm (7.9 to 15.7 in) tall. The leaves are cordate-ovate to subhastate-ovate, typically ranging in size from 3.5 to 5 cm (1.4 to 2.0 in) long and 1.8 to 5 cm (0.71 to 1.97 in) wide, though they are sometimes larger. Inflorescences are 4-flowered verticillasters on terminal racemes or panicles that are 8 to 11 cm (3.1 to 4.3 in) long. The corolla is violet or purple, 1.5 to 1.8 cm (0.59 to 0.71 in) long.
