= Begonia pedatifida =

Scientific classification
- Kingdom: Plantae
- Clade: Tracheophytes
- Clade: Angiosperms
- Clade: Eudicots
- Clade: Rosids
- Order: Cucurbitales
- Family: Begoniaceae
- Genus: Begonia
- Species: B. pedatifida

Binomial name
- Begonia pedatifida H.Lév.

Species of plant

Begonia pedatifida is a species of flowering plant in the family Begoniaceae. It is found growing from southern China into Vietnam. A rhizomatous perennial reaching 0.6 m (2 ft) with large basal leaves, it prefers moist, shady situations under broad-leaf forests at elevations from 300 to 1,700 m (1,000 to 5,600 ft). It is available from commercial suppliers.
