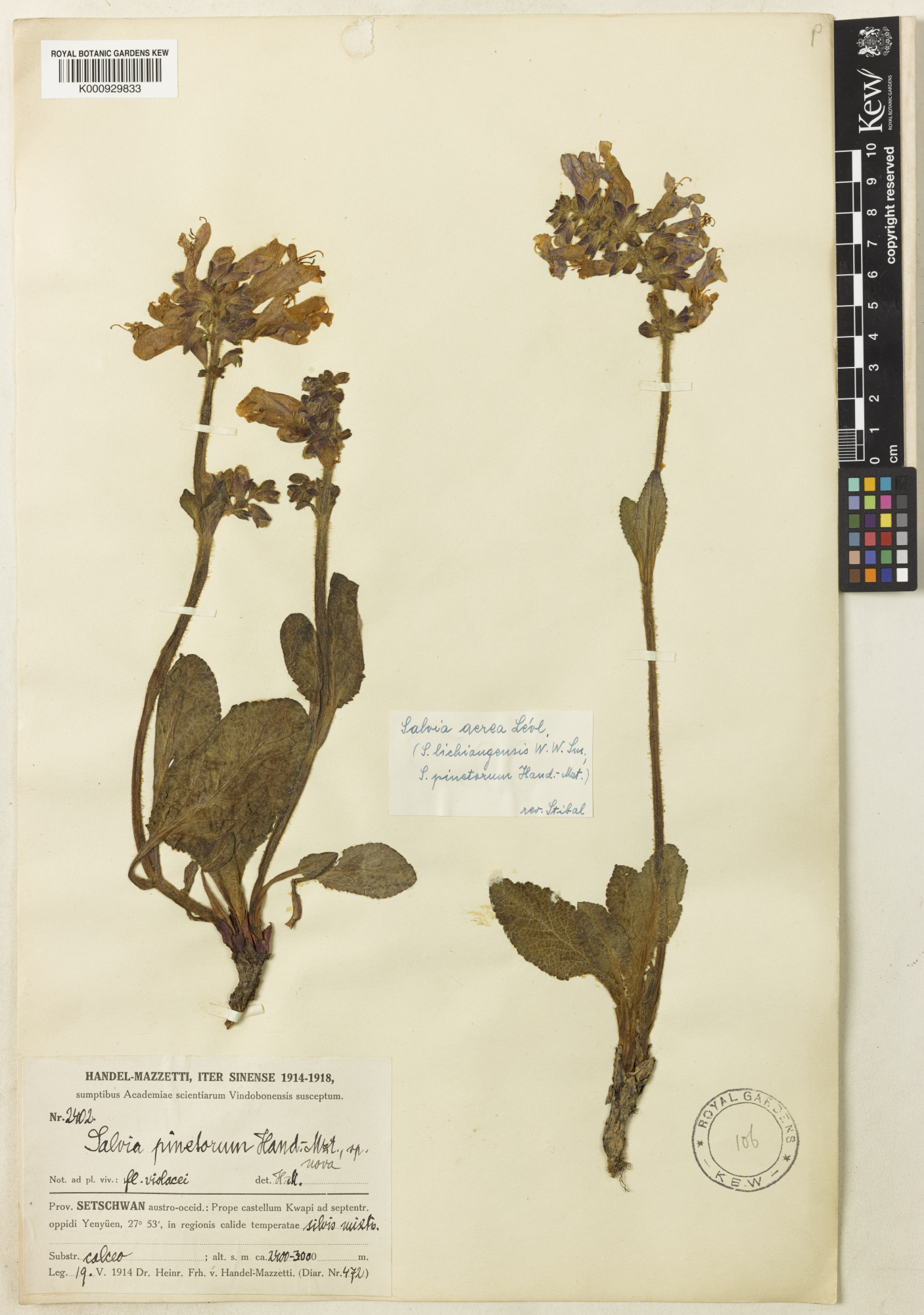

Scientific classification
- Kingdom: Plantae
- Clade: Tracheophytes
- Clade: Angiosperms
- Clade: Eudicots
- Clade: Asterids
- Order: Lamiales
- Family: Lamiaceae
- Genus: Salvia
- Species: S. aerea

Binomial name
- Salvia aerea H.Lév.

= Salvia aerea =

Species of flowering plant

Salvia aerea is a perennial plant that is native to Sichuan, Guizhou, and Yunnan provinces in China, typically growing on hillsides, grasslands, forests, and thickets at 2,500 to 3,300 m (8,200 to 10,800 ft) elevation. It grows 6 to 40 cm (2.4 to 15.7 in) tall, with mostly basal leaves that are typically 2.5 to 8.5 cm (0.98 to 3.35 in) long and 2.5 to 4.5 cm (0.98 to 1.77 in) wide, though they can reach up to 20 cm (7.9 in) by 8 cm (3.1 in).

The inflorescences are racemes up to 15 cm (5.9 in) long, with a 2.6 to 3.5 cm (1.0 to 1.4 in) corolla that comes in a wide variety of colors: orange, purple, white, and dark blue. The plant is used medicinally.
