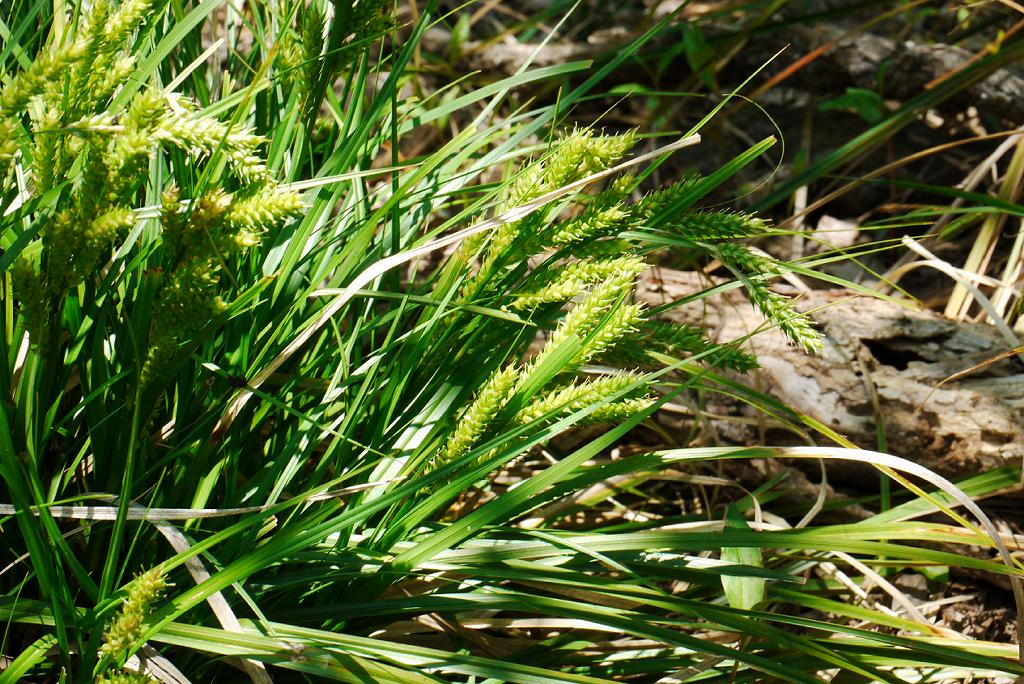
- Habit

Scientific classification
- Kingdom: Plantae
- Clade: Tracheophytes
- Clade: Angiosperms
- Clade: Monocots
- Clade: Commelinids
- Order: Poales
- Family: Cyperaceae
- Genus: Carex
- Species: C. metallica

Binomial name
- Carex metallica H.Lév.

Synonyms
- Carex pachinensis Hayata

= Carex metallica =

Species of plant

Carex metallica, the white-spike sedge, is a species of flowering plant in the family Cyperaceae, native to southeastern China, Taiwan, Korea, and Japan. Its densely tufted culms can reach 50 cm (20 in).
