= Camphora bodinieri =

Conservation status
- Least Concern (IUCN 3.1)

Scientific classification
- Kingdom: Plantae
- Clade: Tracheophytes
- Clade: Angiosperms
- Clade: Magnoliids
- Order: Laurales
- Family: Lauraceae
- Genus: Camphora
- Species: C. bodinieri

Binomial name
- Camphora bodinieri (H.Lév.) Y.Yang, Bing Liu & Zhi Yang

Synonyms
- Cinnamomum bodinieri H.Lév.; Cinnamomum bodinieri var. glabrum C.F.Ji; Cinnamomum glanduliferum var. longipaniculatum Lecomte; Cinnamomum hupehanum Gamble; Cinnamomum inunctum var. fulvipilosum Yen C.Yang

Species of plant

Camphora bodinieri is a species of flowering plant in the family Lauraceae, native to southern China. A tree reaching 16 m (52 ft), it is typically found in situations with more light, such as alongside roads and streams or in open forests and thickets. Its essential oil is high in citral. It is used as a street tree in a number of southern Chinese cities.

The species was first described as Cinnamomum bodinieri by Augustin Abel Hector Léveillé in 1912. In 2022 Yong Yang, Bing Liu, and Zhi Yang placed the species in genus Camphora as Camphora bodinieri.
