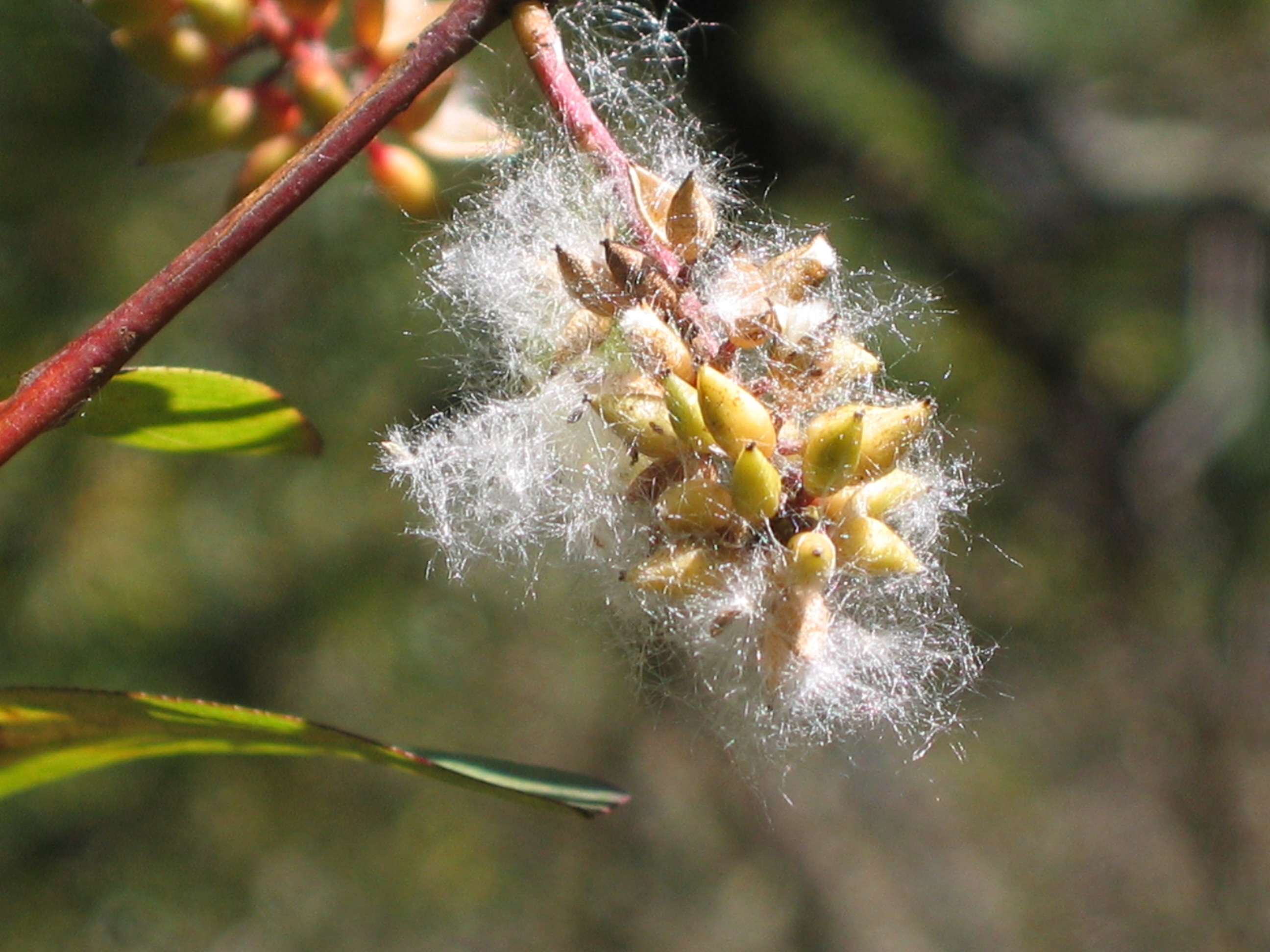

Conservation status
- Least Concern (IUCN 3.1)

Scientific classification
- Kingdom: Plantae
- Clade: Tracheophytes
- Clade: Angiosperms
- Clade: Eudicots
- Clade: Rosids
- Order: Malpighiales
- Family: Salicaceae
- Genus: Salix
- Species: S. cavaleriei

Binomial name
- Salix cavaleriei H.Lév.

= Salix cavaleriei =

Tree in the genus of willows

Salix cavaleriei is a large tree from the genus of willow (Salix) with a gray-brown, furrowed bark. The leaf blades have lengths of 4 to 11 centimetres (1.6 to 4.3 in). The natural range of the species is in China. It is planted for logging and for fastening embankments.

== Description ==
Salix cavaleriei is an 18 metres (60 ft) to rarely 25 metres (80 ft) high tree with a trunk of up to 50 centimetres (20 in) in diameter at chest height. The trunk bark is gray-brown and furrowed. The twigs are reddish brown and thin, young twigs are finely tomentose and later bald. Older branches turn gray-brown. The foliage leaves have triangular-egg-shaped, serrated stipules. The petiole is 6 to 10 millimetres (0.24 to 0.39 in) long, hairy down and has a glandular tip. The leaf blade is broadly lanceolate, elliptical-lanceolate or narrowly elliptical, 10 to 28 centimetres (4 to 11 in) long and 5.1 to 10.2 centimetres (2 to 4 in) wide, pointed to long pointed or rarely pointed, with a finely serrated leaf edge and a wedge-shaped or rounded base. Both leaf sides are initially reddish, later glabrous, the upper side green, the underside greenish.

The male inflorescences are 3 to 4.5 centimetres (1.2 to 1.8 in) long and about 8 millimetres (0.31 in) in diameter catkins. The peduncle is long and forms two or three, rarely four leaves. The bracts are ovate-rounded to triangular, ciliate and hairy down on both sides. Male flowers have two nectar glands and six to eight rarely up to twelve stamens . The female catkins are 5.1 to 8.9 centimetres (2 to 3.5 in) long. The bracts resemble those of the male catkin. Female flowers also have two nectar glands. The ovary is stalked. As fruitegg-shaped, about 6 millimetres (0.24 in) long, glabrous and clearly stalked capsules are formed. Salix cavaleriei flowers when the leaves shoot from March to April, the fruits ripen from April to May.

== Range ==
The natural range is in the Chinese provinces of Guangxi, Guizhou, Sichuan, and Yunnan. It grows along rivers and in damp forest edges at altitudes of 1800 to 2500 meters.

== Taxonomy ==
Salix cavaleriei is a species from the genus of willows (Salix) in the willow family (Salicaceae). There, it is the section Wilsonia assigned. It was described scientifically for the first time in 1909 by Augustin Hector Léveillé. The genus name Salix is Latin and has been from the Romans used for various willow species.

Synonyms of the species are Pleiarina cavaleriei (H.Lév.) N.Chao & GTGong, Salix polyandra H.Lév., Salix pyi H.Lév., Salix yunnanensis H.Lév.

== Use ==
Salix cavaleriei is used to fortify embankments and serves as a supplier of wood.

== Literature ==
- Wu Zheng-yi, Peter H. Raven (Ed.): Flora of China . Volume 4: Cycadaceae through Fagaceae . Science Press / Missouri Botanical Garden Press, Beijing / St. Louis 1999, ISBN 0-915279-70-3, pp. 171, 174.
- Helmut Genaust: Etymologisches Wörterbuch der botanischen Pflanzennamen 3rd, completely revised and expanded edition. Nikol, Hamburg 2005, ISBN 3-937872-16-7, p. 552 (reprint from 1996) (in German).
