= Begonia cavaleriei =

Conservation status
- Vulnerable (IUCN 3.1)

Scientific classification
- Kingdom: Plantae
- Clade: Tracheophytes
- Clade: Angiosperms
- Clade: Eudicots
- Clade: Rosids
- Order: Cucurbitales
- Family: Begoniaceae
- Genus: Begonia
- Species: B. cavaleriei

Binomial name
- Begonia cavaleriei H.Lév.

Species of plant

Begonia cavaleriei, the Changgan Begonia, is a species of plant in the family Begoniaceae. It is endemic to China. It grows on limestone rocks.
