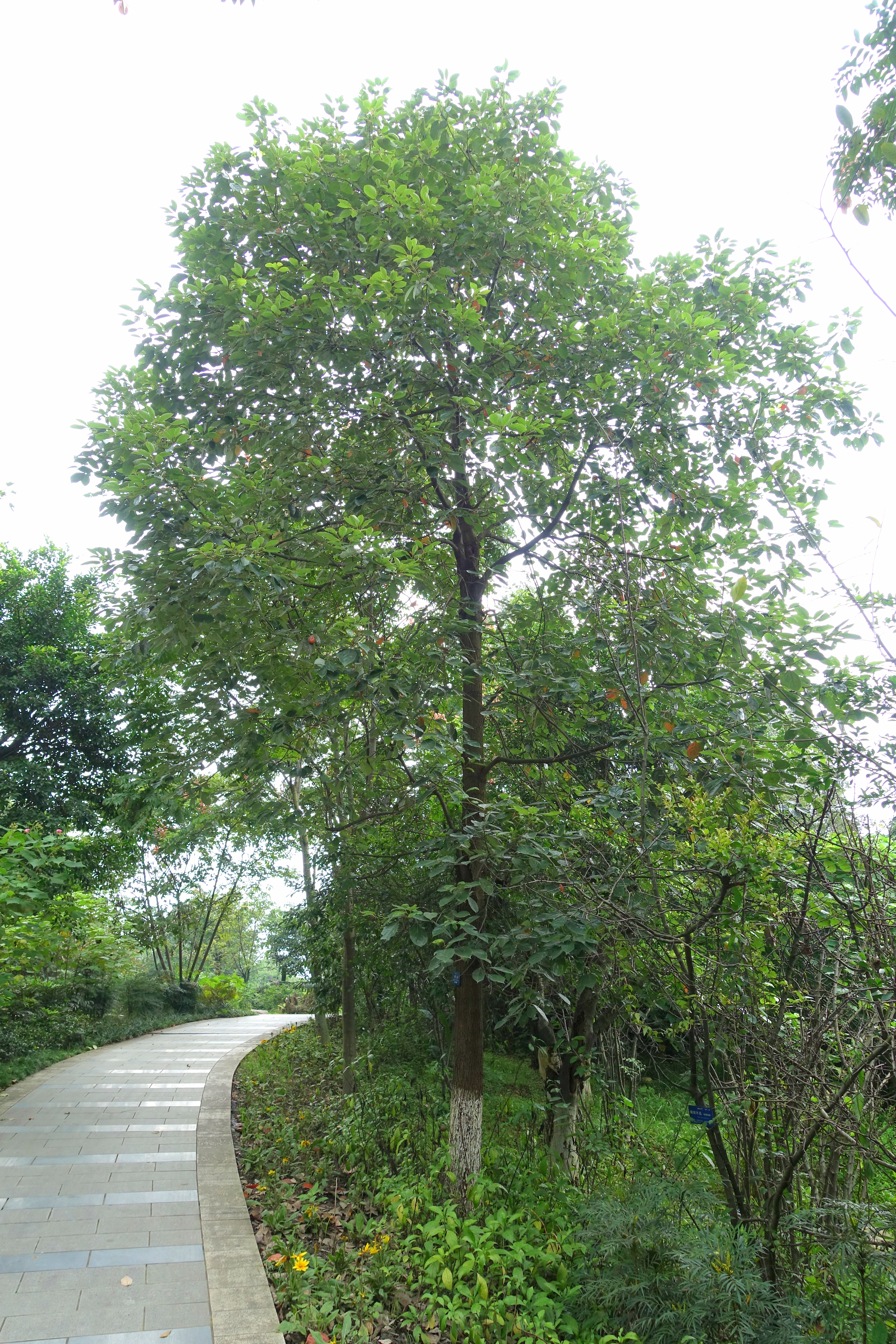
- At Chengdu Botanical Garden
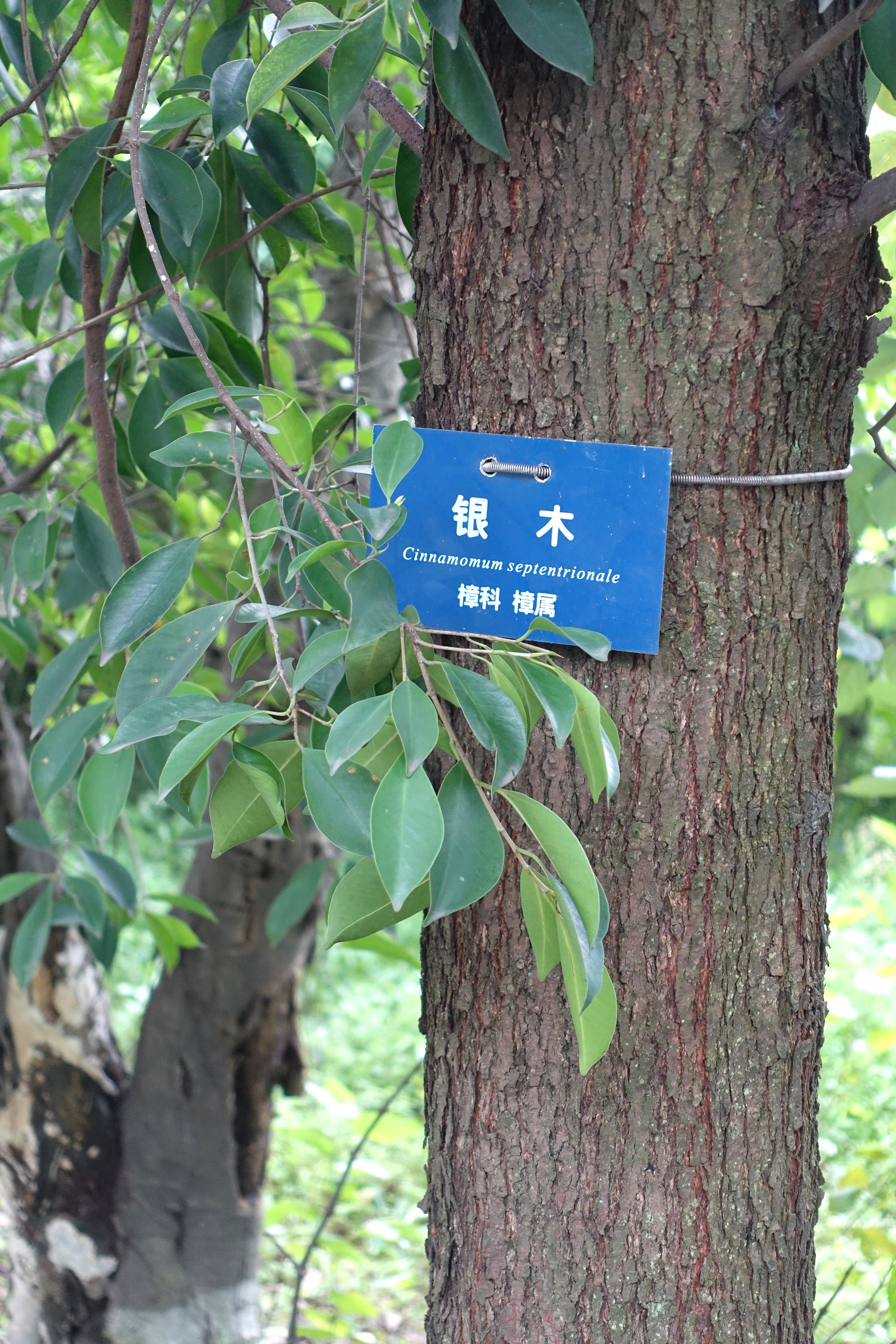
- Trunk

Conservation status
- Least Concern (IUCN 3.1)

Scientific classification
- Kingdom: Plantae
- Clade: Tracheophytes
- Clade: Angiosperms
- Clade: Magnoliids
- Order: Laurales
- Family: Lauraceae
- Genus: Camphora
- Species: C. septentrionalis

Binomial name
- Camphora septentrionalis (Hand.-Mazz.) Y. Yang, Bing Liu & Zhi Yang

Synonyms
- Cinnamomum septentrionale Hand.-Mazz.; Cinnamomum inunctum var. albosericeum Gamble

= Camphora septentrionalis =

Species of flowering plant

Camphora septentrionalis is a species of flowering plant in the family Lauraceae, native to central China. A commercially important timber tree, it is also used as a street tree in a number of Chinese cities.
