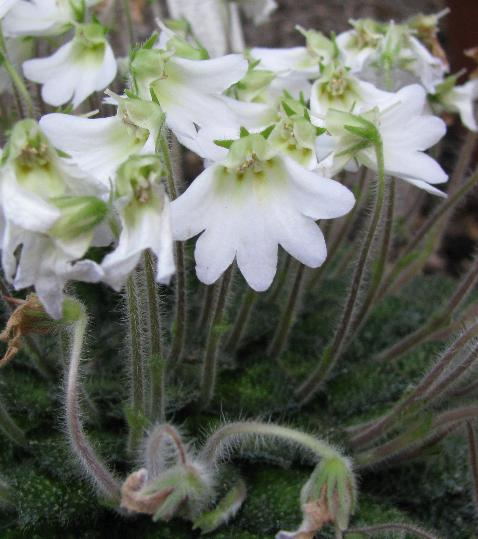

Scientific classification
- Kingdom: Plantae
- Clade: Tracheophytes
- Clade: Angiosperms
- Clade: Eudicots
- Clade: Asterids
- Order: Lamiales
- Family: Gesneriaceae
- Genus: Petrocosmea
- Species: P. rosettifolia

Binomial name
- Petrocosmea rosettifolia C.Y.Wu ex H.W.Li

= Petrocosmea rosettifolia =

Species of flowering plant

Petrocosmea rosettifolia is a species of flowering plant in the family Gesneriaceae. A new species Petrocosmea cryptica J.M.H.Shaw was described in 2011, long known in cultivation but mistakenly identified as P. rosettifolia.

== Description ==
The petioles of this species are puberulent and grow to approximately 4 cm. The leaves are sparsely pubescent, and have a broadly ovate to orbicular or broadly elliptic shape. They grow to about 0.5 to 4.0 cm x 0.4 to 0.3 cm.

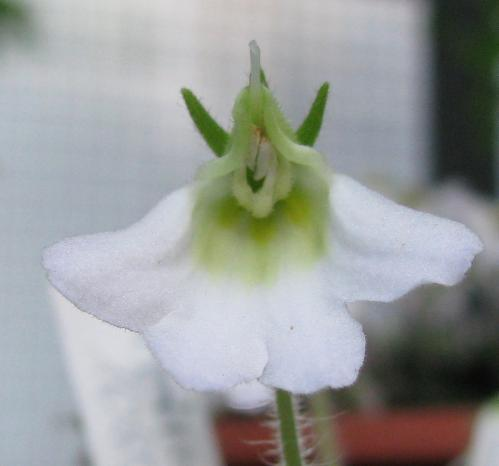
