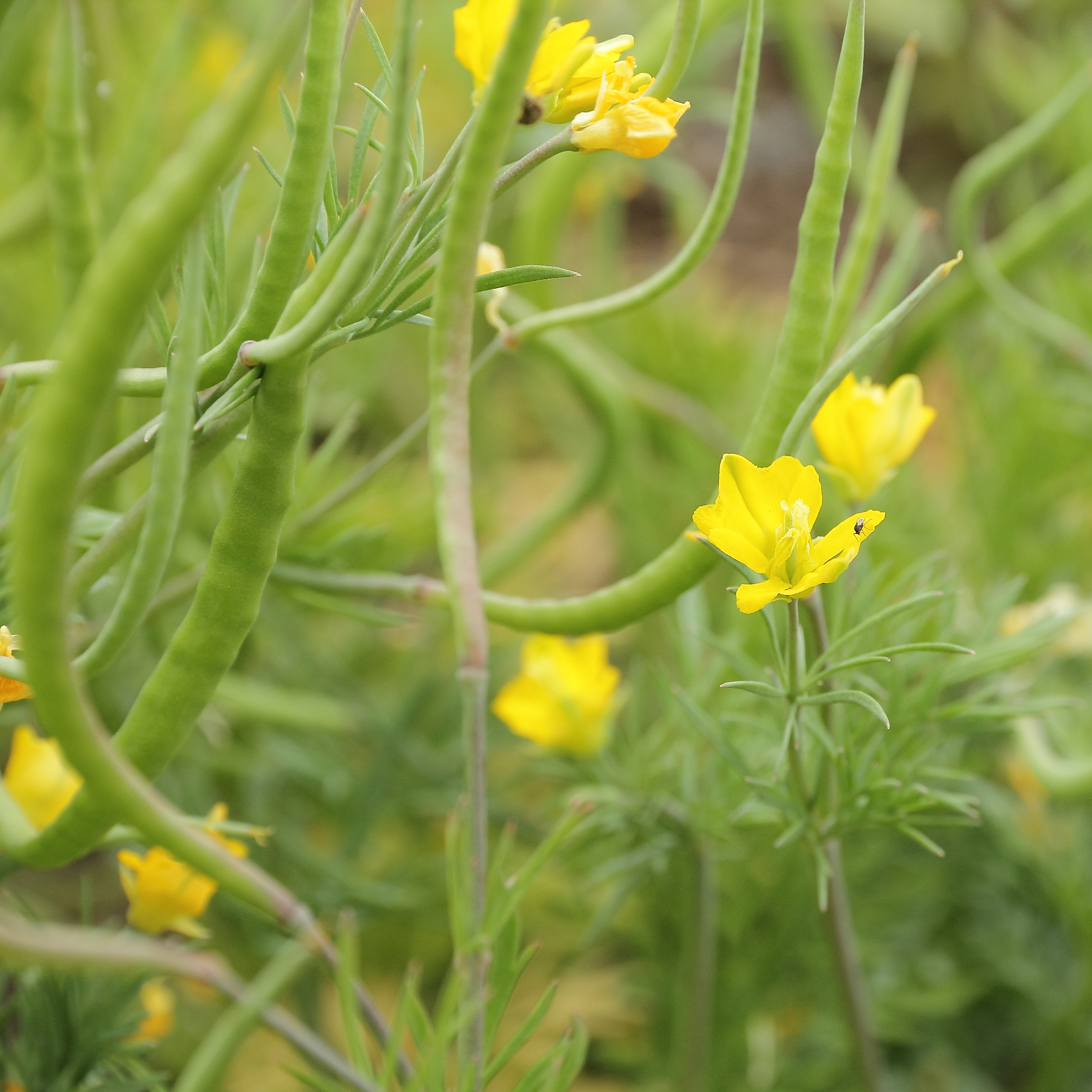

Scientific classification
- Kingdom: Plantae
- Clade: Tracheophytes
- Clade: Angiosperms
- Clade: Eudicots
- Order: Ranunculales
- Family: Papaveraceae
- Genus: Hypecoum
- Species: H. procumbens

Binomial name
- Hypecoum procumbens L.

= Hypecoum procumbens =

Species of plant

Hypecoum procumbens, the sickle-fruited hypecoum, is a species of annual herb in the family Papaveraceae. They have a self-supporting growth form and simple leaves. Individuals can grow to 40 cm tall.

== Sources ==
This article incorporates text from a free content work. Licensed under CC0 (license statement/permission). Text taken from Hypecoum procumbens. Encyclopedia of Life.
