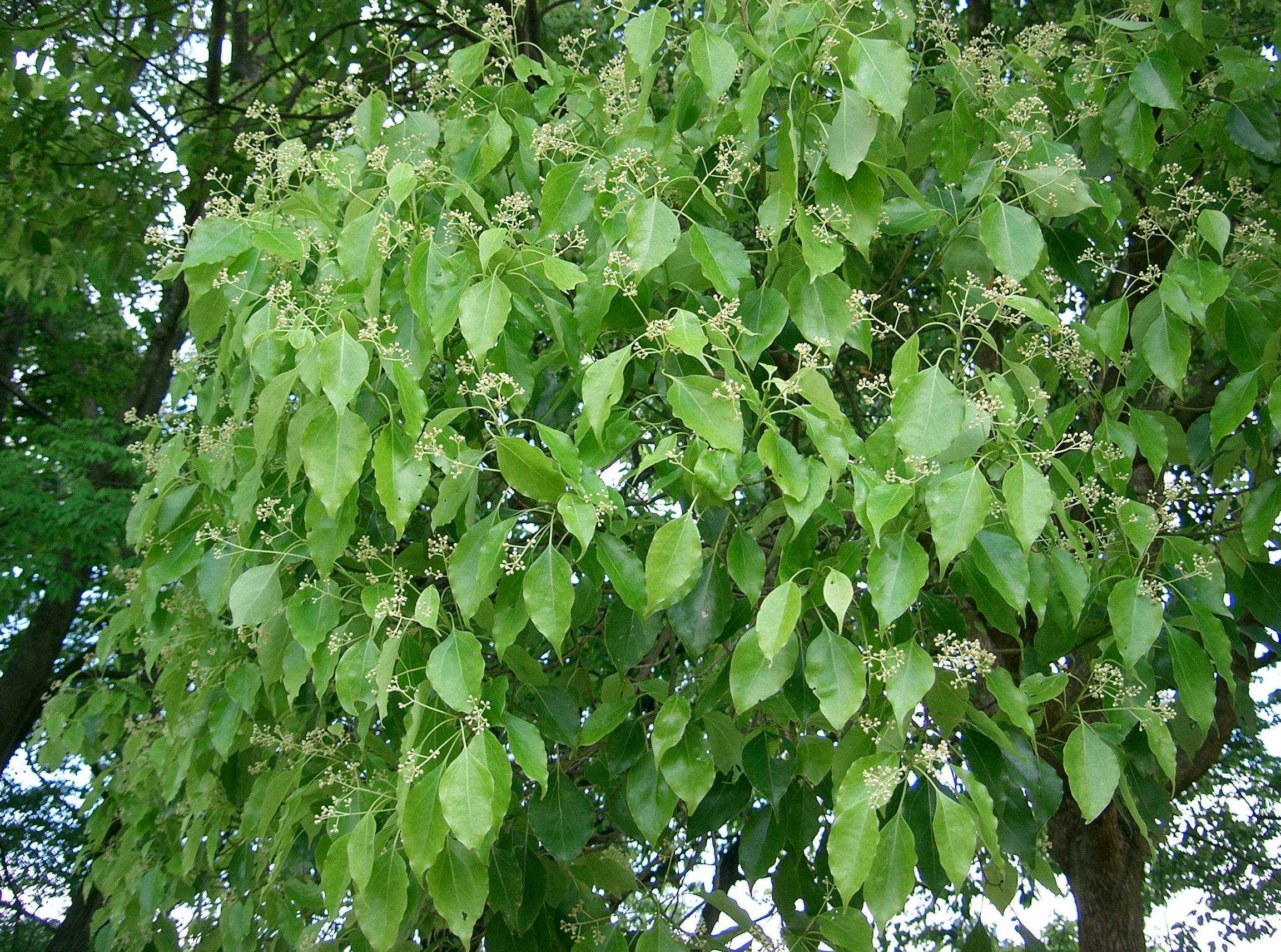
- Camphora officinarum

Scientific classification
- Kingdom: Plantae
- Clade: Embryophytes
- Clade: Tracheophytes
- Clade: Angiosperms
- Clade: Magnoliids
- Order: Laurales
- Family: Lauraceae
- Genus: Camphora; Fabr.

Species
- See text.

Synonyms
- Parthenoxylon Blume

= Camphora (plant) =

Genus of flowering plants

Camphora is a genus of evergreen plants belonging to the laurel family Lauraceae, previously considered a synonym of Cinnamomum. The genus contains approximately 20 species, distributed in tropical and subtropical regions of Asia.

== Description ==
The species of Camphora are evergreen trees or shrubs. Their leaves are alternate and pinnately veined or weakly tripliveined, which differed from the opposite or subopposite and tripliveined leaves of Cinnamomum species. The tepals do not persist when fruiting, unlike in Cinnamomum species, where they are persistent or at least partially persistent. The flowers are produced in paniculate inflorescences with cymes bearing strictly opposite lateral flowers. The flowers are bisexual, with nine fertile stamens, plus three staminodes with conspicuous cordate or sagittate heads in the fourth androecial whorl. The fruit is cupulate.

== Taxonomy and phylogeny ==
The genus Camphora was described in 1759 by the German botanist Philipp Conrad Fabricius. It was listed under synonymy of Cinnamomum s.l. for a long time, with the species classified in the Sect. Camphora of Cinnamomum. A molecular phylogenetic study published in 2022 found that the large genus Cinnamomum was polyphyletic; in the revised classification to create monophyletic genera, genus Camphora was resurrected. It contains the following species:

- Camphora blandfordii (M.Gangop.) Ormerod
- Camphora bodinieri (H.Lév.) Y.Yang, Bing Liu & Zhi Yang ≡ Cinnamomum bodinieri
- Camphora brachythyrsa (J.Li) Y.Yang, Bing Liu & Zhi Yang ≡ Cinnamomum brachythyrsum
- Camphora camphorata (H.Lév.) Ormerod ≡ Machilus camphoratus H.Lév., Cinnamomum caudiferum Kosterm., Cinnamomum foveolatum (Merr.) H.W.Li & J.Li
- Camphora chartophylla (H.W.Li) Y.Yang, Bing Liu & Zhi Yang ≡ Cinnamomum chartophyllum
- Camphora glandulifera (Wall.) Nees ≡ Cinnamomum glanduliferum
- Camphora glaucescens (Nees) Ormerod
- Camphora illicioides (Hayata) K.F.Chung & C.L.Hsieh ≡ Cinnamomum ilicioides
- Camphora kanahirae (Hand.-Mazz.) Y.Yang, Bing Liu & Zhi Yang ≡Cinnamomum kanehirae
- Camphora longepaniculata (Gamble) Y.Yang, Bing Liu & Zhi Yang ≡ Cinnamomum longepaniculatum
- Camphora micrantha (Hayata) Y.Yang, Bing Liu & Zhi Yang ≡ Cinnamomum micranthum
- Camphora migao (H.W.Li) Y.Yang, Bing Liu & Zhi Yang ≡ Cinnamomum migao
- Camphora mollifolia (H.W.Li) Y.Yang, Bing Liu & Zhi Yang ≡ Cinnamomum mollifolium
- Camphora mollis (W.W.Sm.) Ormerod ≡ Camphora tenuipilis (Kosterm.) Y.Yang, Bing Liu & Zhi Yang, Cinnamomum tenuipile Kosterm.
- Camphora officinarum Boerh. ex Fabr. ≡ Cinnamomum camphora – camphor laurel
- Camphora parthenoxylon (Jack) Nees ≡ Cinnamomum parthenoxylon – Selasian wood, Martaban camphor wood, saffrol laurel
- Camphora philippinensis (Merr.) Y.Yang, Bing Liu & Zhi Yang ≡ Cinnamomum philippinense
- Camphora platyphylla (Diels) Y.Yang, Bing Liu & Zhi Yang ≡ Cinnamomum platyphyllum
- Camphora purpurea (H.G.Ye & F.G.Wang) Y.Yang, Bing Liu & Zhi Yang ≡ Cinnamomum purpureum
- Camphora rufotomentosa (K.M.Lan) Y.Yang, Bing Liu & Zhi Yang ≡ Cinnamomum rufomentosum
- Camphora septentrionalis (Hand.-Mazz.) Y.Yang, Bing Liu & Zhi Yang ≡ Cinnamomum septentrionale

The following species were classified in the Sect. Camphora of Cinnamomum s.l., but have now proven to be more closely related to true Cinnamomum:

- Cinnamomum longipetiolatum
- Cinnamomum saxatile

Its relationship with closely related taxa is shown below:

- - - Ocotea group
    - - Camphora
      - Sassafras
  - - Cinnamomum
    - Kuloa
