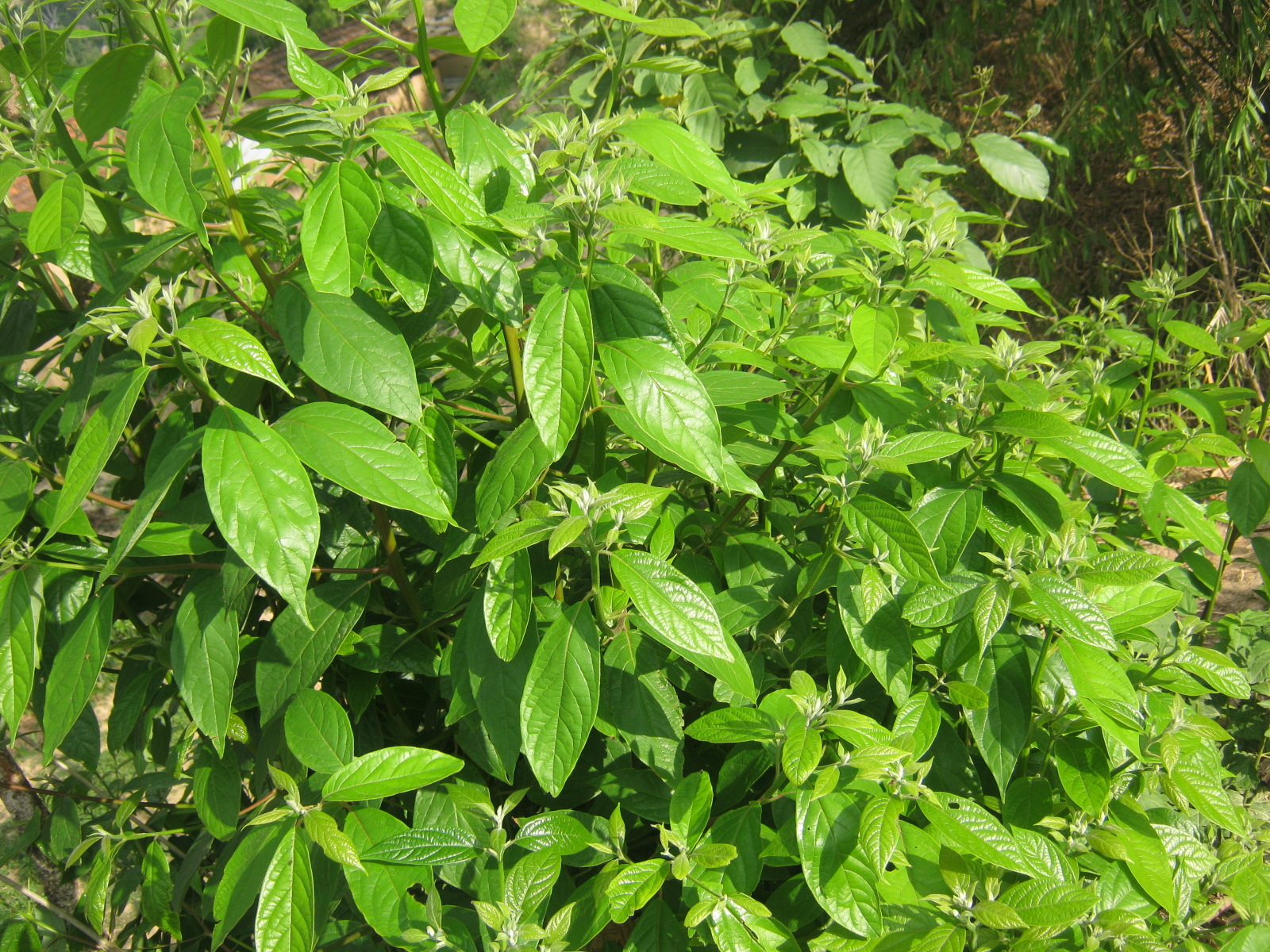
- Camphora glaucescens plant in Panchkhal valley

Conservation status
- Least Concern (IUCN 3.1)

Scientific classification
- Kingdom: Plantae
- Clade: Tracheophytes
- Clade: Angiosperms
- Clade: Magnoliids
- Order: Laurales
- Family: Lauraceae
- Genus: Camphora
- Species: C. glaucescens

Binomial name
- Camphora glaucescens (Nees) Ormerod

Synonyms
- Cecidodaphne glaucescens Nees; Cinnamomum cecidodaphne Meisn.; Cinnamomum glanduliferum var. caniflorum Meisn.; Cinnamomum glaucescens (Nees) Hand.-Mazz.; Cinnamomum glaucescens var. caniflora (Meisn.) M.Gangop.; Laurus glaucescens Buch.-Ham. ex Nees; Tetranthera glaucescens Wall.

= Camphora glaucescens =

Species of flowering plant

Camphora glaucescens (Nepali:सुगन्धकोकिला, Sugandhakokila) is an evergreen tree native to Bangadesh, Bhutan, northeastern India (including Sikkim, Manipur, and the Khasi Hills), and Nepal in the Indian Subcontinent, and to Myanmar, Laos, and Vietnam in Indochina. The pericarp of the fruits can be distilled for an essential oil, sugandha kokila oil, which is used in perfumery and traditional medicine.

This species is diploid and can grow to an elevation of 1,300 m (4,300 ft). Cinnamomum glaucescens is recognized as an aromatic plant, meaning it has an elevated level of essential oil.

== Cultivation ==
Cinnamomum glaucescens has been successfully cultivated, and promotes species conservation. A ranking scale was established, assessing mode of domestication, cultivation and social beliefs from farmer or forest users perspective, to rank the suitability of MAPs for farming. With the highest ranking being five, and lowest zero, sugandha kokila ranked four out of five. This demonstrate that Cinnamomum glaucescens is not only physiologically appropriate for cultivation but also has a high chance to be adopted by farmers, when compared with other MAPs. Furthermore, the GEF Small Grants Programme ran a successful project mobilizing two indigenous Nepalese communities, promoting the knowledge and tools to cultivate sugandha kokila. The project amended the two involved communities’ local forestry operation plan to include the conservation of Cinnamomum glaucescens. The two communities involved planted Cinnamomum glaucescens 13ha of community forests, in addition to 6ha planted on private land. Increasing the market demand of sugandha kokila oil will not only benefit the farmers and producers in Nepal but also encourage the conservation of Cinnamomum glaucescens. As the market grows, the plant will increase in value, encouraging more cultivation of the plant and therefore increase conservation efforts. Also, three women-run forest nurseries established, responsible for growing 30,000 seedlings of sugandha kokila, sapindus, cinnamon, zanthoxylum, lemon and asparagus. Creating women run nurseries empowered women to learn new skills and play an important role in the cultivation of sugandha kokila and other products. Additionally, 86 households were supported in developing suitable infrastructure for the processing of sugandha kokila. This project is an example of how the cultivation of sugandha kokila using a community approach can empower women and conserve this endemic plant.
