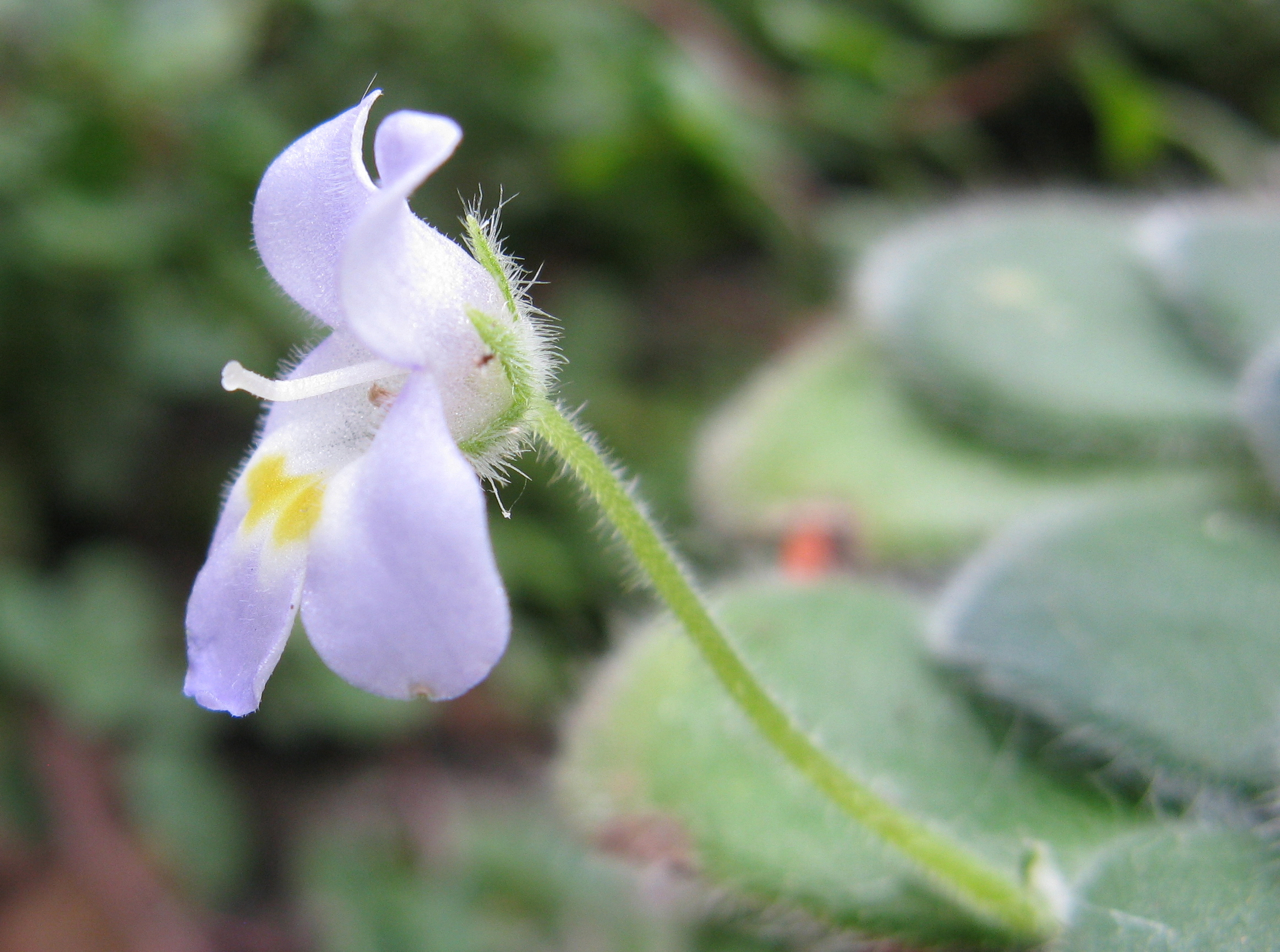

Scientific classification
- Kingdom: Plantae
- Clade: Tracheophytes
- Clade: Angiosperms
- Clade: Eudicots
- Clade: Asterids
- Order: Lamiales
- Family: Gesneriaceae
- Genus: Petrocosmea
- Species: P. forrestii

Binomial name
- Petrocosmea forrestii Craib

= Petrocosmea forrestii =

Species of flowering plant

Petrocosmea forrestii is a species of flowering plant in the family Gesneriaceae native to China, and sometimes cultivated as a houseplant. It grows among rocks in shady places. Like other species in its genus, it does not develop a stem above ground, but spreads by rhizomes. The entire rosette of leaves is less than 15 centimetres (5.9 in) in diameter.
