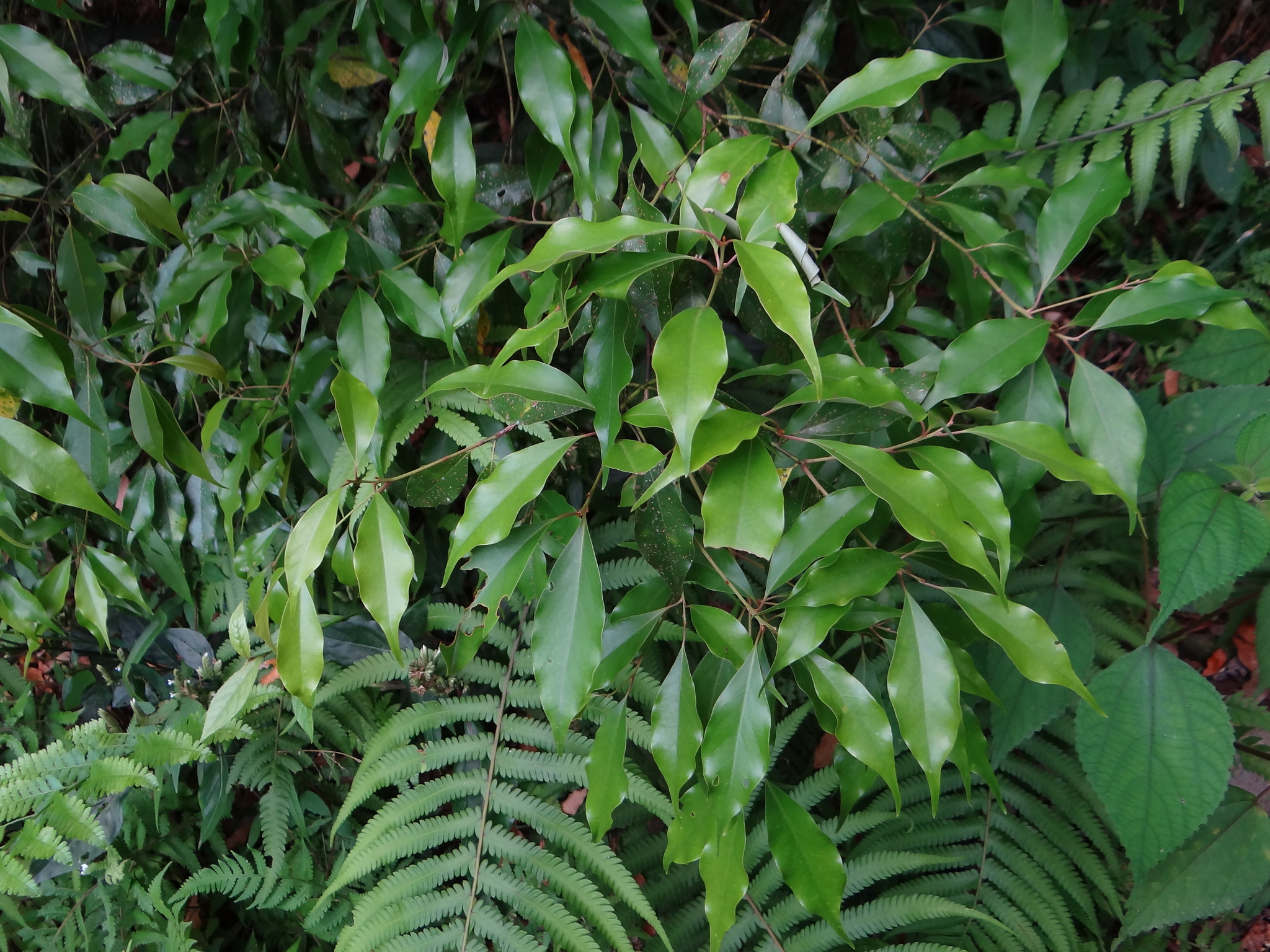

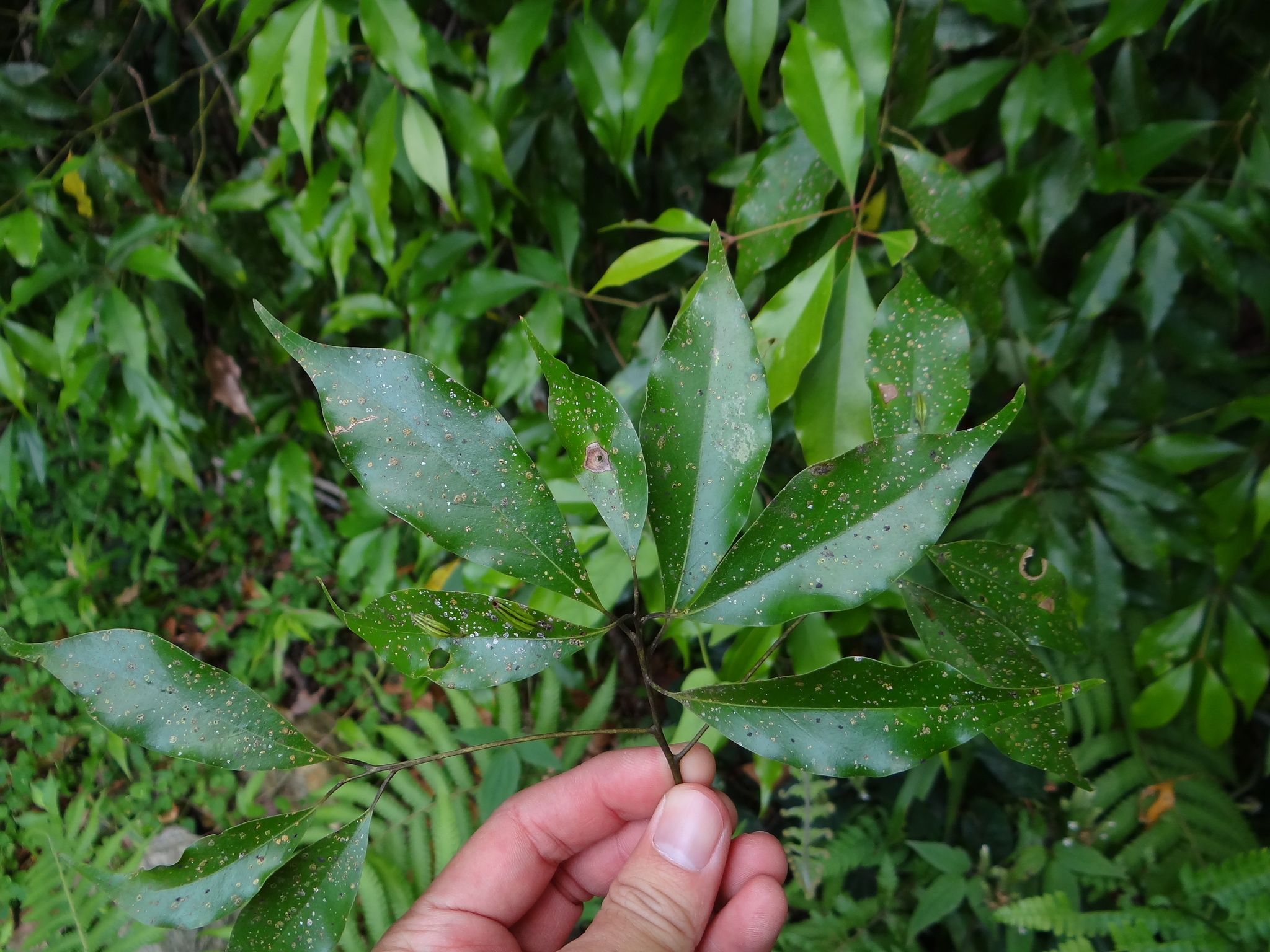

Conservation status
- Least Concern (IUCN 3.1)

Scientific classification
- Kingdom: Plantae
- Clade: Tracheophytes
- Clade: Angiosperms
- Clade: Magnoliids
- Order: Laurales
- Family: Lauraceae
- Genus: Camphora
- Species: C. philippinensis

Binomial name
- Camphora philippinensis (Merr.) Y.Yang, Bing Liu & Zhi Yang

Synonyms
- Cinnamomum acuminatissimum Hayata; Cinnamomum caudatifolium Hayata; Cinnamomum philippinense (Merr.) C.E.Chang; Machilus philippinensis Merr.; Machilus acuminatissimus (Hayata) Kaneh.; Machilus acuminatissimus var. tasulinensis J.C.Liao; Persea acuminatissima (Hayata) Kosterm.; Persea philippinensis (Merr.) Elmer

= Camphora philippinensis =

Species of plant

Camphora philippinensis is a species of flowering plant in the family Lauraceae, native to Taiwan and the Philippines. It was first described by Elmer Drew Merrill in 1906 as Machilus philippinensis. It grows in subtropical and tropical moist lowland forest. The IUCN Red list assesses the species as Least Concern.
