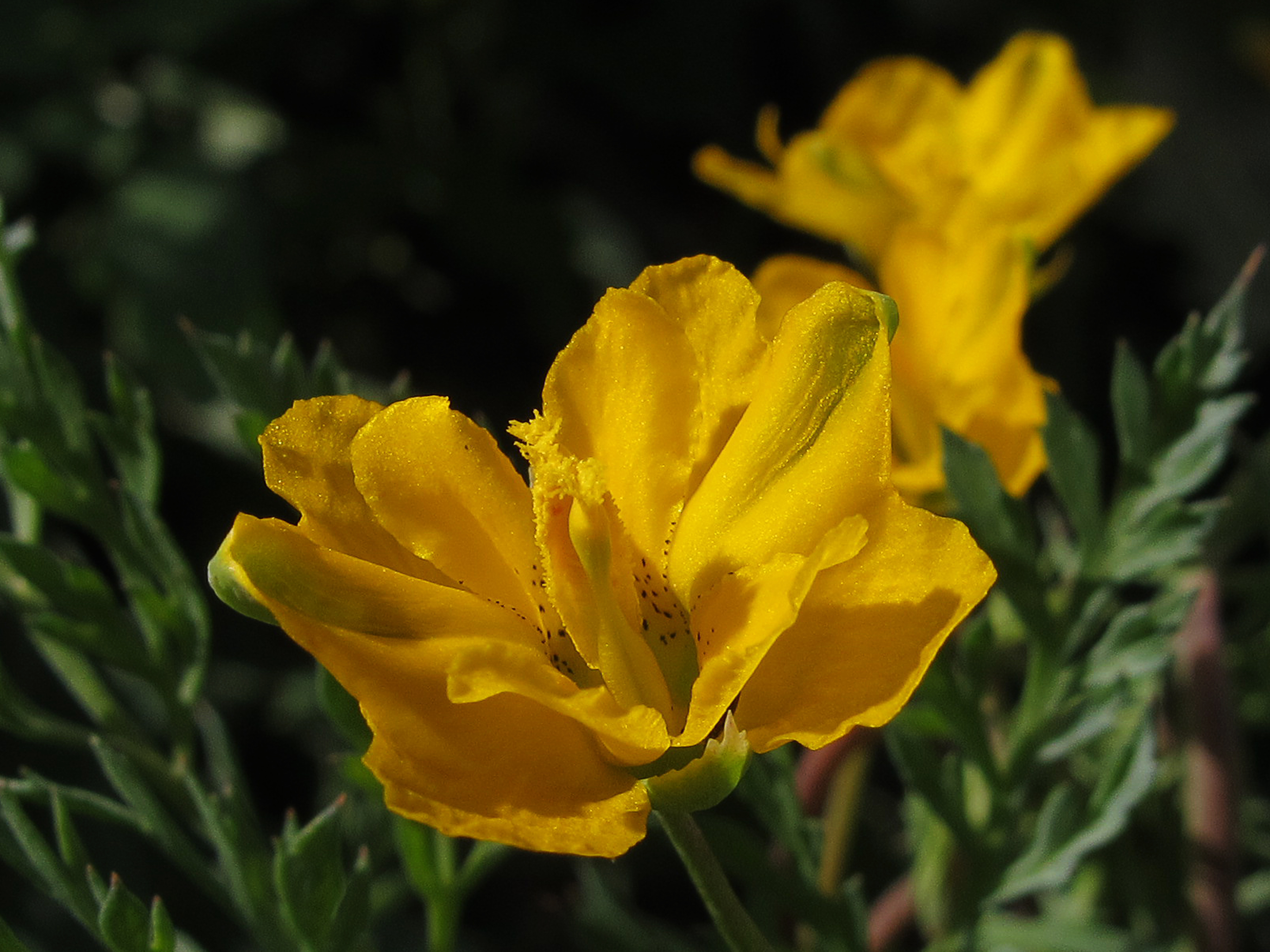

Scientific classification
- Kingdom: Plantae
- Clade: Tracheophytes
- Clade: Angiosperms
- Clade: Eudicots
- Order: Ranunculales
- Family: Papaveraceae
- Genus: Hypecoum
- Section: Hypecoum sect. Pendula
- Species: H. pendulum

Binomial name
- Hypecoum pendulum L.

Synonyms
- Chiazospermum pendulum (L.) Turcz.; Hypecoum caucasicum Ledeb.; Hypecoum procumbens var. pendulum f. laxum Kuntze; Hypecoum tetragonum Bertol.

= Hypecoum pendulum =

Species of poppy

Hypecoum pendulum is a species of flowering plant in the poppy family.

== Description ==
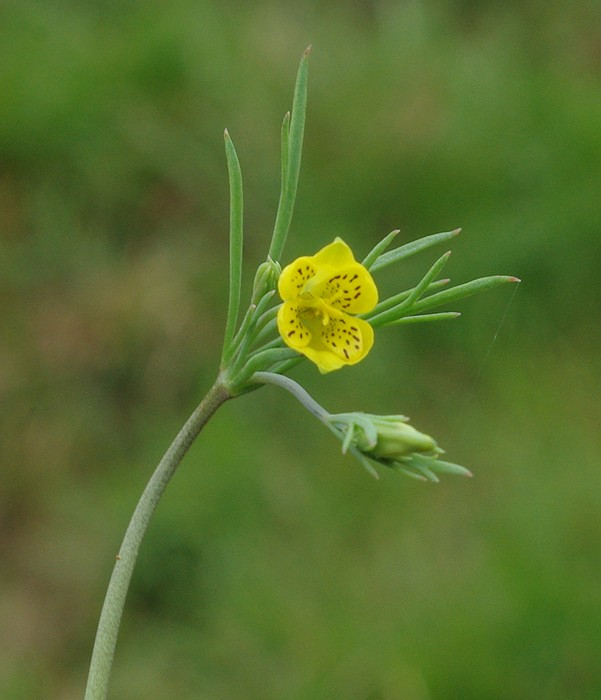

Its seeds are 2 by 2.5 mm in size. They are angular and shaped roughly like a kidney, with a slanting point and stunted base. They are an orange brown or light creamy brown, lacking prickles on the surface or having small wart-like projections.

== Taxonomy ==
Hypecoum pendulum was first formally described by Carl Linnaeus in the first edition of Species Plantarum in 1753. In it, he combined three previous names for the species and noted its habitat in "Galloprovincia", modern-day southern France.

=== Infraspecifics ===
Hypecoum pendulum var. parviflorum used to be considered its own species, H. parviflorum. It was originally described from Lake Balkhash and is found around the Caspian Sea and east to the Himalayas. Porfiry Krylov was the first to demote the species, assigning it the name H. pendulum ssp. parviflorum in 1931. James Cullen demoted the species again to variety in 1966, noting that there was a series of intermediate forms between var. parviflorum and the standard var. pendulum. The only morphological differences are the character of the outer petals and their lobes.
