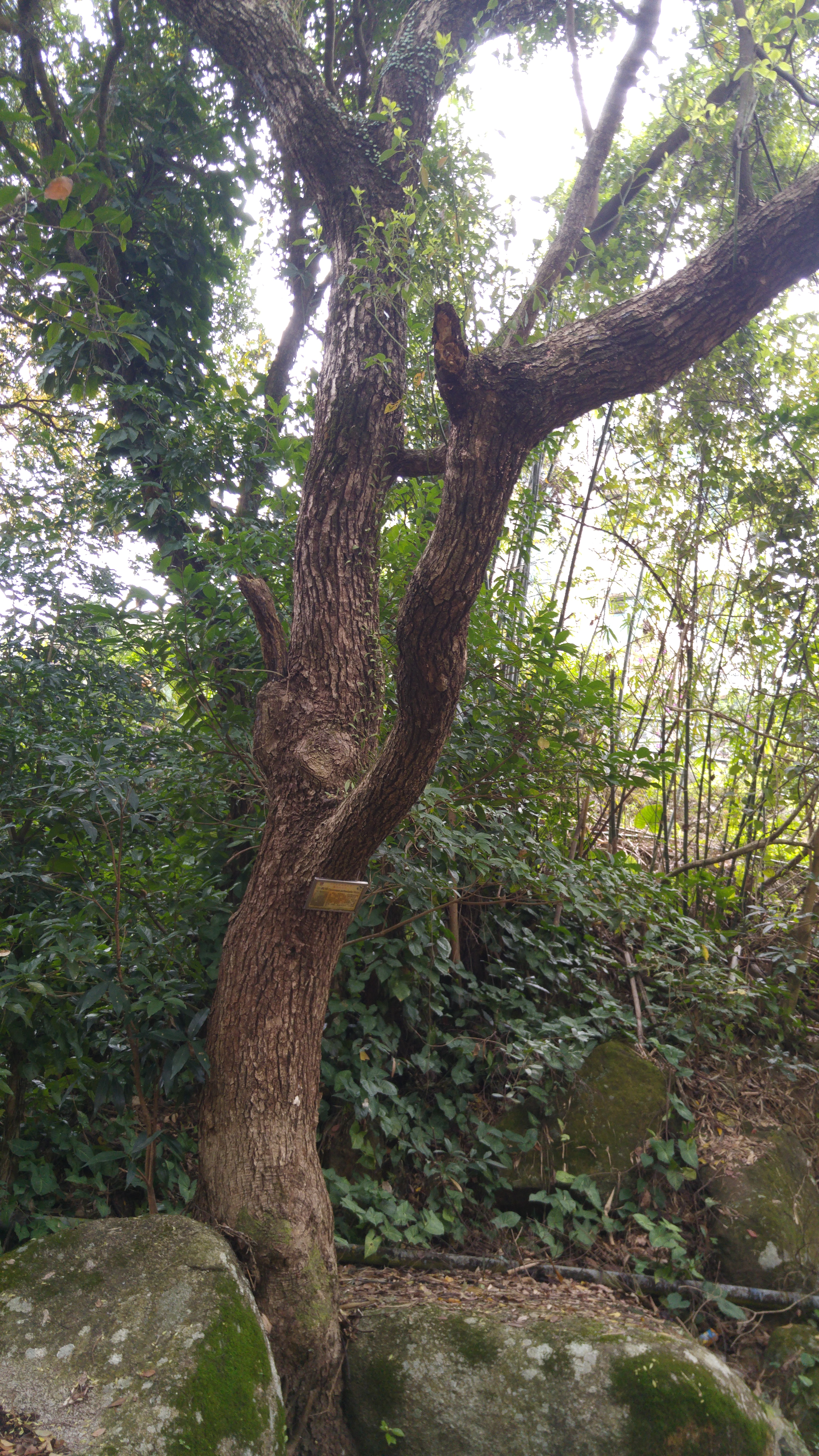
- The trunk of Cinnamomum parthenoxylon, Siu Lek Yuen Green Trail, Sha Tin, NT, Hong Kong

Conservation status
- Least Concern (IUCN 3.1)

Scientific classification
- Kingdom: Plantae
- Clade: Embryophytes
- Clade: Tracheophytes
- Clade: Spermatophytes
- Clade: Angiosperms
- Clade: Magnoliids
- Order: Laurales
- Family: Lauraceae
- Genus: Camphora
- Species: C. parthenoxylon

Binomial name
- Camphora parthenoxylon (Jack) Nees

Synonyms
- Synonymy: Camphora chinensis Nees; Camphora inodora Blume ex Miq.; Camphora inuncta Nees; Cinnamomum parthenoxylon (Jack) Meisn.; Camphora porrecta (Roxb.) Voigt; Camphora pseudosassafras Miq.; Cinnamomum barbatoaxillatum N.Chao; Cinnamomum inodorum (Blume ex Miq.) Meisn.; Cinnamomum inunctum (Nees) Meisn.; Cinnamomum malaccense Meisn.; Cinnamomum neesianum Meisn.; Cinnamomum penninervium Kosterm.; Cinnamomum porrectum Kosterm.; Cinnamomum pseudosassafras Meisn.; Cinnamomum purpureum H.G.Ye & F.G.Wang; Laurus chinensis Nees; Laurus glandulifera Meisn.; Laurus parthenoxylon Jack; Laurus porrecta Roxb.; Laurus pruinosa Reinw. ex Blume; Laurus pseudosassafras Blume; Laurus sassafras Lour.; Litsea pruinosa Nees; Parthenoxylon porrectum (Roxb.) Blume; Parthenoxylon pruinosum Blume; Parthenoxylon pseudosassafras Blume; Persea pseudosassafras Zoll. & Moritzi; Phoebe latifolia Champ. ex Benth.; Sassafras loureiroi Kostel.; Sassafras parthenoxylon (Jack) Nees; Tetranthera camphoracea Wall. ex Meisn.

= Camphora parthenoxylon =

Species of tree

Camphora parthenoxylon is an evergreen tree in the genus Camphora, 10–20 m (33–66 ft) tall. It is native to South and East Asia (Bhutan, Myanmar, Cambodia, China, Hong Kong, India, Indonesia, Laos, Malaysia, Nepal, Philippines, Thailand, and Vietnam).

== Nomenclature ==
Camphora parthenoxylon is known variously as Selasian wood, Saffrol laurel, Martaban camphor wood, Yellow cinnamomum or Yellow camphora-tree in English. It has the outdated heterotypic synonym Laurus porrecta (Roxb.). The species name parthenoxylon derives from parthenos xylon (Greek: παρθενός ξύλον), meaning "virgin wood".

The common name in Chinese is huangzhang (黄樟) and in Spanish alcanforero amarillo, both meaning "yellow camphor". In Vietnamese it is called re hương and in Cambodia, it is thought to be the tree known as mreah prew phnom (Khmer: ម្រះព្រៅភ្នំ).

== Description ==
Camphora parthenoxylon is an evergreen tree that can grows up to 50 metres tall. with a trunk to 60 cm in diameter. The tree has greenish brown bark with deep fissures that peels off in small flakes. The entire tree emits a strong camphora-scent. Its leaves are glossy green ovals 7–10 cm long with a point at the end. Like many plants in the Lauraceae, the leaves give off a pleasant smell when crushed. The flowers appear in clusters, very small, and are greenish yellow in colour. The fruits are drupes that turns black when matured.

=== Life cycle ===
The species flowers from March to May, and fruits from April to October.

== Range and habitat ==
Camphora parthenoxylon is a widely distributed tree native to South and Southeast Asia and parts of Australasia, including southern and southwestern China, Nepal, eastern Himalayas, Assam, Indochina, Hainan, Peninsular Malaysia, Sumatra, Java, Borneo, the Lesser Sunda Islands, Pakistan, and southern Australia. The estimated extent of occurrence (EOO) is very large at 8,025,973 km^{2}, with an area of occupancy (AOO) of 520 km^{2}.

The species grows in primary and secondary lowland and montane tropical and subtropical humid forests, from sea level up to 2,000 metres. It can grow on sand, sandstone, or granite substrates. In Borneo, it occurs in Sarawak, Sabah, and East Kalimantan, where it is found in lowland and montane rainforests, often in secondary vegetation.

== Uses ==
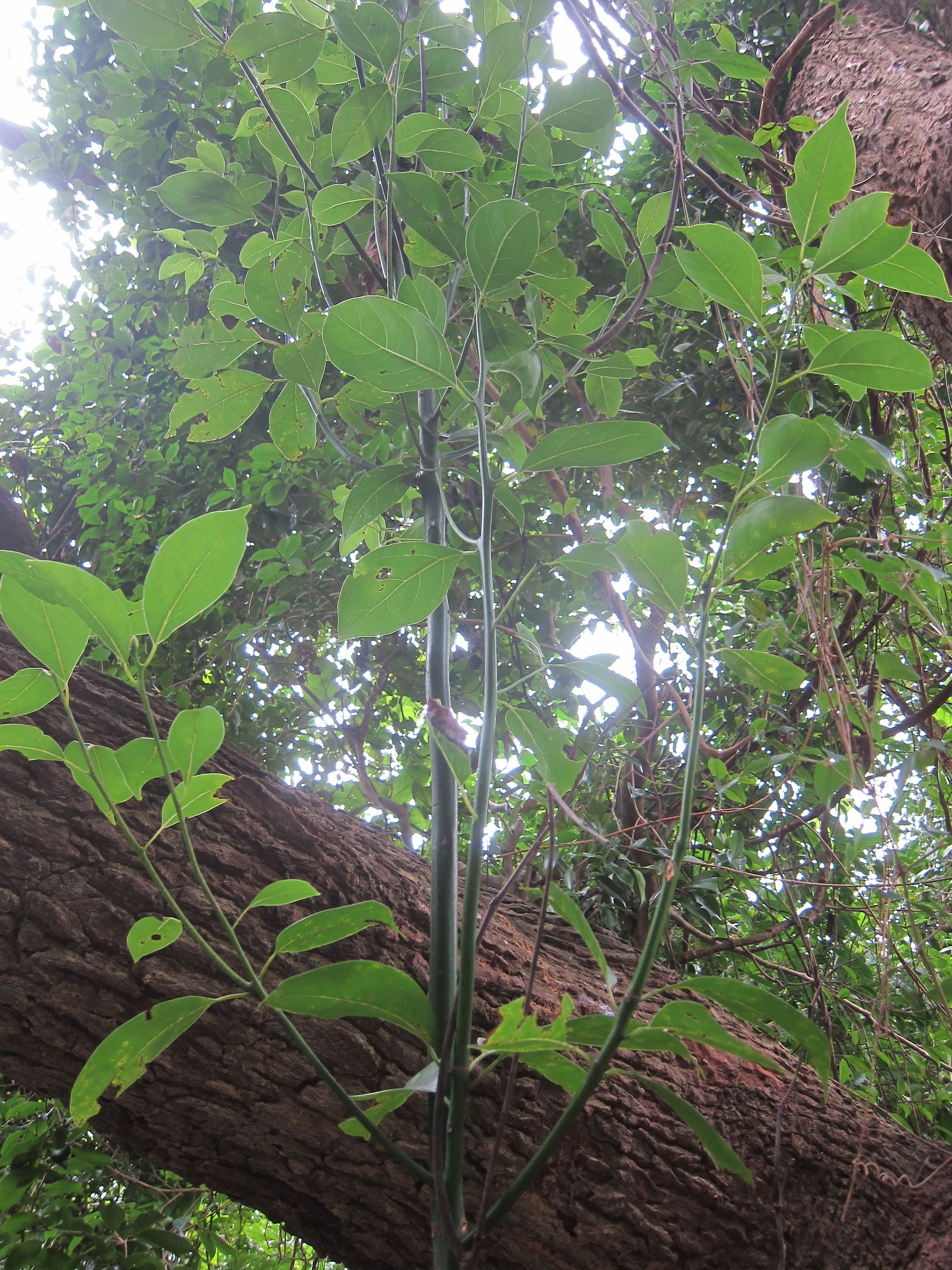
Foliages

The aromatic bark of Camphora parthenoxylon is used for flavoring, like that of many other Cinnamomum species. The wood and fruit emit a strong camphor scent that repels insects, and the essential oils from its wood and leaves, known as "camphora oil", are effective in controlling household pests. The bark extract has also shown medicinal potential; in rats, it was found to reduce postprandial hyperglycemia.

The durable, insect-resistant wood is valued for shipbuilding, furniture, and artwork, while the seeds can be processed into soap. Additionally, its straight trunk and large canopy make it an excellent shade tree for streets and parks. In Indonesia, the flowers hold cultural significance, symbolizing love and the connection between the living and the dead. In Kudus Regency, Java, they were traditionally scattered on tombs by family members.

However, the tree is under significant pressure from harvesting for safrole, a compound used to produce the pesticide synergist piperonyl butoxide, the flavor and fragrance compound piperonal, and the psychoactive drug MDMA. Much of this illicit collection occurs in Cambodia's Cardamom Mountains and Botum Sakor National Park, a situation explored in the 2009 TV documentary Forest of Ecstasy, an episode of Vanguard.

== Conservation ==
In 2004, the Cambodian government classified C. parthenoxylon as a rare species and prohibited any logging of this tree. In addition, the production, import, and export of safrole rich oils has been illegal in Cambodia since 2007.

In Vietnam the tree is considered critically endangered.
