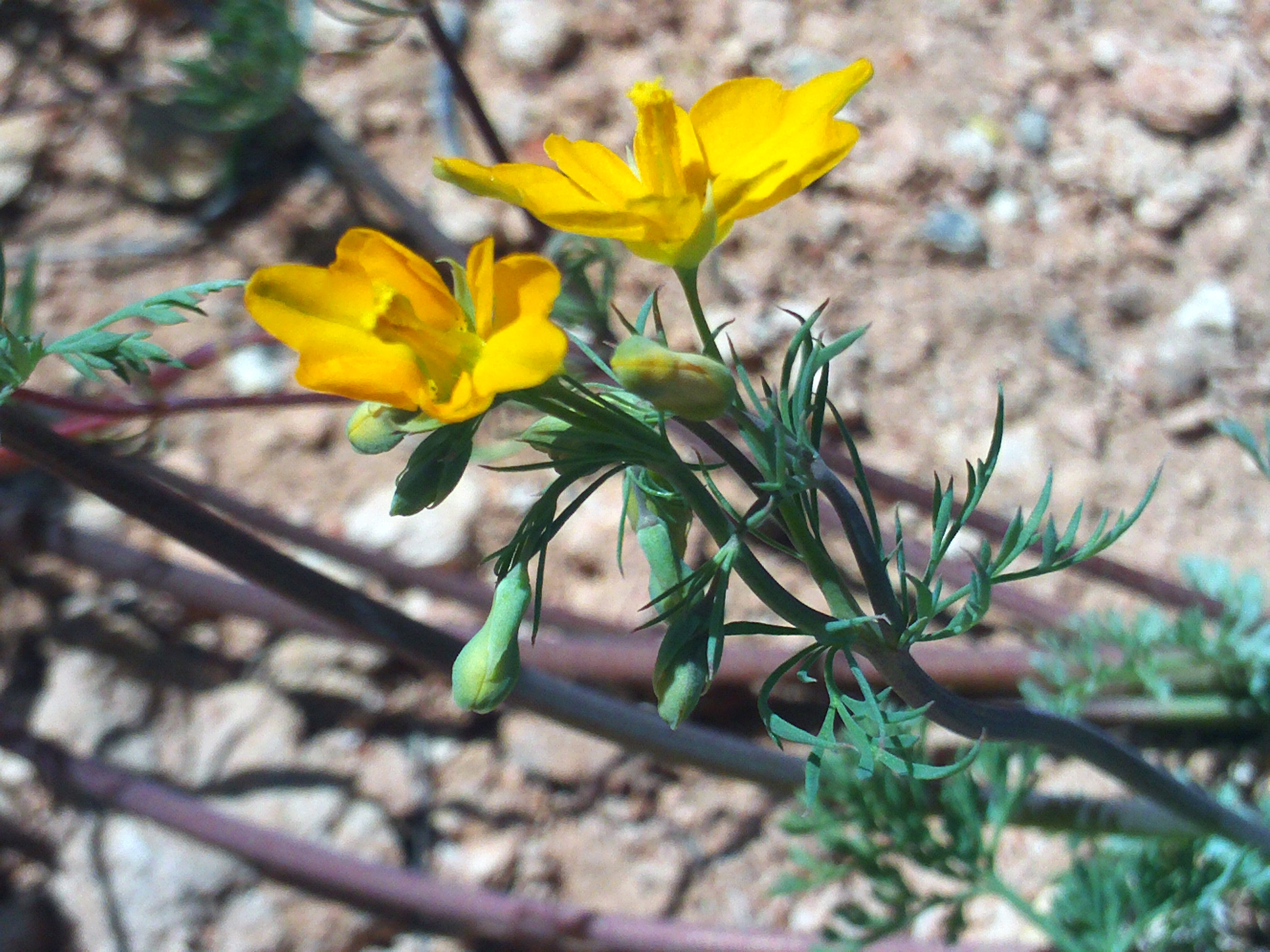
- Hypecoum procumbens

Scientific classification
- Kingdom: Plantae
- Clade: Tracheophytes
- Clade: Angiosperms
- Clade: Eudicots
- Order: Ranunculales
- Family: Papaveraceae
- Subfamily: Fumarioideae
- Genus: Hypecoum; L.

Species
- See text

= Hypecoum =

Genus of flowering plants in the poppy family

Hypecoum is a genus of flowering plants in the family Papaveraceae, found in temperate areas of northern Africa, Europe and Asia. The lectotype is Hypecoum procumbens.

== Species ==
Species currently accepted by The Plant List are as follows:

- Hypecoum aegypitacum (Forssk.) Asch. & Schweinf.
- Hypecoum aequilobum Viv.
- Hypecoum alpinum Z.X. An
- Hypecoum dimidiatum Delile
- Hypecoum erectum L.
- Hypecoum ferrugineomaculatum Z.X. An
- Hypecoum imberbe Sm.
- Hypecoum leptocarpum Hook. f. & Thomson
- Hypecoum littorale Wulfen
- Hypecoum pendulum L.
- Hypecoum procumbens L.
- Hypecoum pseudograndiflorum Petrovič
- Hypecoum torulosum Å.E.Dahl
- Hypecoum trilobum Trautv.
- Hypecoum zhukanum Lidén
