= Sugandha kokila oil =

Sugandha kokila oil is an essential oil derived from the berries of the evergreen plant Cinnamomum glaucescens, part of the family Lauraceae, which is native to Nepal and grows wild in the districts of Dang, Rolpa, and Sallyan in the Rapti Zone.

Using steam distillation, the dried berries of Cinnamomum glaucescens produce sugandha kokila oil, which is yellow in color and has a camphor-like spicy aroma. This product can be used as a fragrance in soaps, detergents, cosmetics, perfumes and industrial fragrances. Sugandha kokila oil is also used in indigenous medicine as a demulcent and stimulant. The Nepal Trade Integration Strategy 2010, identified Medicinal and Aromatic Plants (MAPs) as one of Nepal’s top twenty goods and services with export potential.

== Wild harvesting ==
Citizens of Nepal have been collecting wild herbs and berries from the natural environment for centuries, where both women and men traditionally carry out the harvesting practice. Today, the harvesting of MAPs is regulated by The Department of Forests, under the Ministry of Forests and Soil Conservation. While wild aromatic and medicinal plants are the property of the government, any citizen is free to harvest them after applying to the department of forests and paying government royalty fees. However, non-timber forest products, such as Cinnamomum glaucescens, are over harvested, and if the current rate of collection occurs, may disappear from Nepalese forests.

== Production ==
The majority of MAPs grown in Nepal, are exported to India to be processed. However, as Cinnamomum glaucescens is considered an at-risk species due to over-harvesting for monetary gains, this species can only be exported after processing occurs within Nepal. Therefore, sugandha kokila is processed within the country, using distillation units operated by local people. MAPs have been processed in Nepal since 1981 with the government establishment of Herbs Production and Processing Co. Ltd., which today supports 600 families that are involved in the cultivation and processing of MAPs. Currently, there are an estimated 112 distillation units operating across Nepal, the majority of which are located in the Terai regions. Distilling the product in Nepal will result in a unique product and provide steady revenue for the rural, low-income population.

== Distillation process ==
Sugandha kokila oil is a product of steam distillation from the dried berries of Cinnamomum glaucescens. Steam distillation reduces wasted material and lowers productions costs. This process enables the sugandha kokila oil to be distilled at a temperature significantly lower than its boiling point. The steam breaks through the plant material and releases the essential oils, along with the steam, after which they rise upward into a connecting pipe leading them to the condenser. In the condenser the steam and essential oils are cooled and liquefied. Due to differences in density, the essential oil will float on the surface of the water and be siphoned off. The essential oil is then filtered to remove any impurities. Finally, the quality of the oil needs to be verified and is stored in container made of glass, stainless steel, aluminum, epoxy coated drums or food grade high-density polyethylene containers.

== Products ==
Similar to most essential oils, sugandha kokila oil, is a diverse product due to the array of uses for manufactures. Sugandha kokila oil has a spicy scent and is therefore used in beauty products and toiletries, including soaps, detergents, cosmetics, massage oils, lotions, hair treatments, and perfumes.

== See also ==
- Yarrow oil
