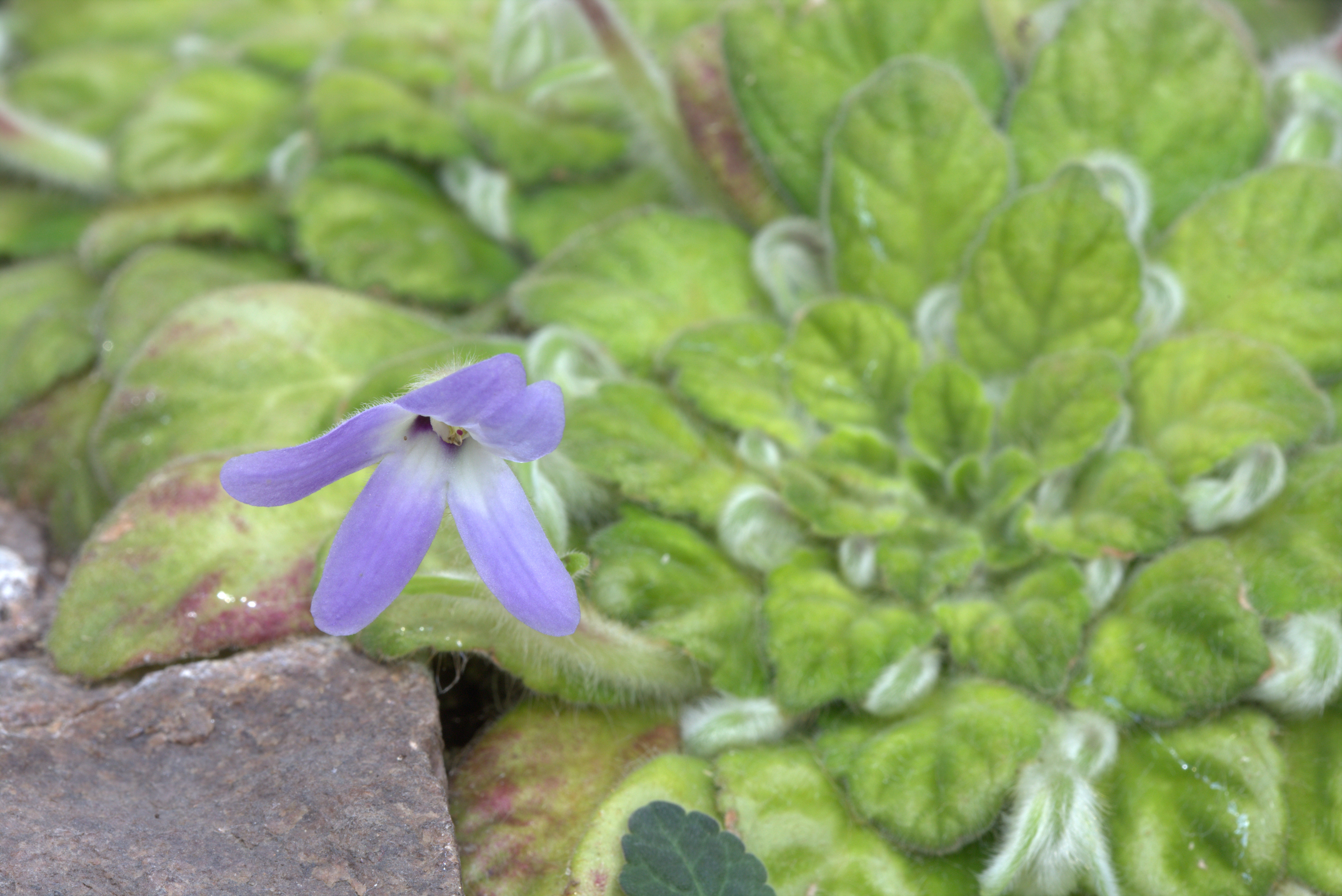

Scientific classification
- Kingdom: Plantae
- Clade: Embryophytes
- Clade: Tracheophytes
- Clade: Spermatophytes
- Clade: Angiosperms
- Clade: Eudicots
- Clade: Asterids
- Order: Lamiales
- Family: Gesneriaceae
- Genus: Petrocosmea
- Species: P. kerrii

Binomial name
- Petrocosmea kerrii Craib 1918

Synonyms
- Damrongia kerrii (Craib) Pellegr.; Petrocosmea wardii W.W. Sm.

= Petrocosmea kerrii =

Species of flowering plant

Petrocosmea kerrii is a species of flowering plant in the family Gesneriaceae, sometimes cultivated as a houseplant. In the past, it has been erroneously placed in the genus Damrongia. It was first described by William Grant Craib in 1918.

It is divided into two subspecies:

- P. k. var. crinita W. T. Wang
- P. k. var. kerrii
