= Petrocosmea iodioides =

Scientific classification
- Kingdom: Plantae
- Clade: Embryophytes
- Clade: Tracheophytes
- Clade: Spermatophytes
- Clade: Angiosperms
- Clade: Eudicots
- Clade: Asterids
- Order: Lamiales
- Family: Gesneriaceae
- Genus: Petrocosmea
- Species: P. iodioides

Binomial name
- Petrocosmea iodioides Hemsl.

Species of flowering plant

Petrocosmea iodioides, called the violet petrocosmea, is a species of flowering plant in the family Gesneriaceae, native to southeast and south-central China. It has gained the Royal Horticultural Society's Award of Garden Merit.
