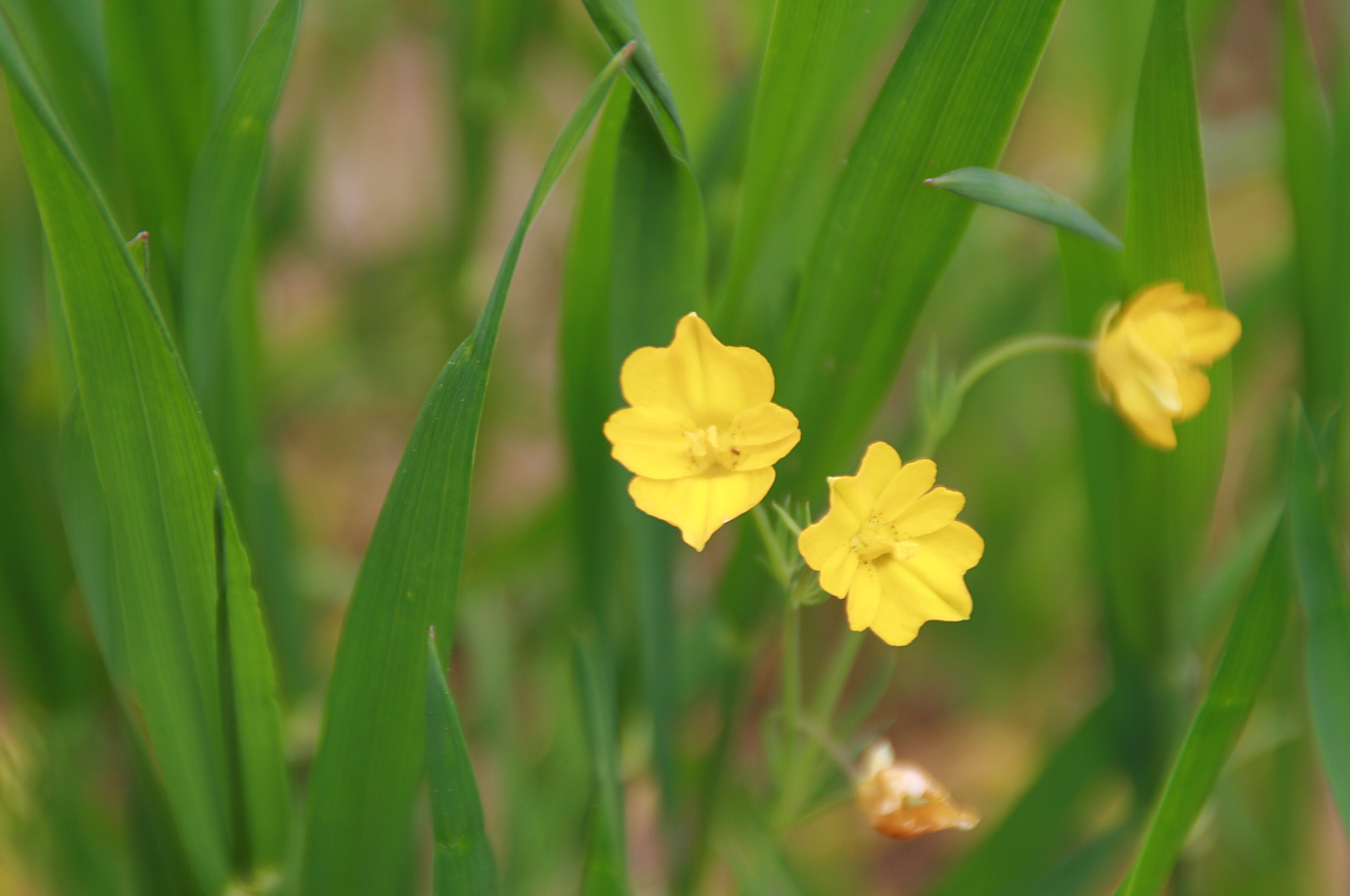

Scientific classification
- Kingdom: Plantae
- Clade: Tracheophytes
- Clade: Angiosperms
- Clade: Eudicots
- Order: Ranunculales
- Family: Papaveraceae
- Genus: Hypecoum
- Species: H. imberbe

Binomial name
- Hypecoum imberbe Sm.

Synonyms
- Hypecoum grandiflorum

= Hypecoum imberbe =

Species of plant

Hypecoum imberbe, the sicklefruit hypecoum, is a species of annual herb in the family Papaveraceae. Flowers are visited by Lycaena phlaeas (small copper).

== Sources ==
This article incorporates text from a free content work. Licensed under CC0 (license statement/permission). Text taken from Hypecoum imberbe. Encyclopedia of Life.
