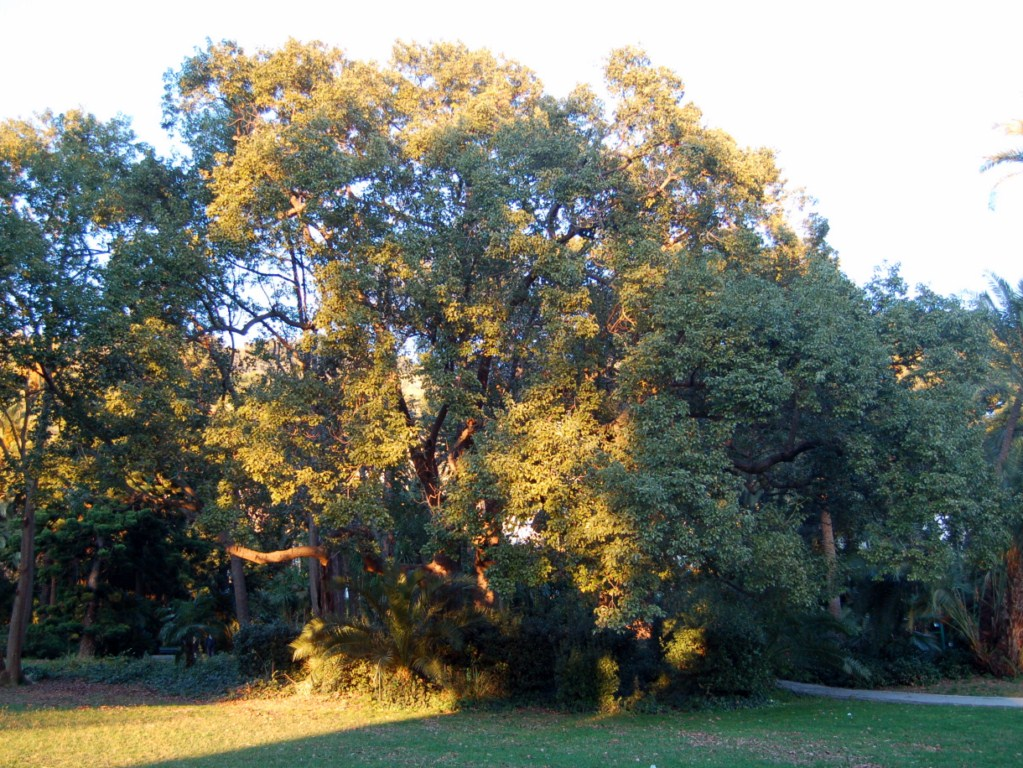

Conservation status
- Least Concern (IUCN 3.1)

Scientific classification
- Kingdom: Plantae
- Clade: Tracheophytes
- Clade: Angiosperms
- Clade: Magnoliids
- Order: Laurales
- Family: Lauraceae
- Genus: Camphora
- Species: C. glandulifera

Binomial name
- Camphora glandulifera (Wall.) Nees

Synonyms
- Cinnamomum glanduliferum (Wallich) Meisn.; Cinnamomum cavaleriei H.Lév.; Laurus glandulifera Wall.; Machilus dominii H. Lév.; Machilus mekongensis Diels

= Camphora glandulifera =

Species of tree

Camphora glandulifera, common name false camphor tree or Nepal camphor tree, is a tree in the genus Cinnamomum of the family Lauraceae.

== Description ==
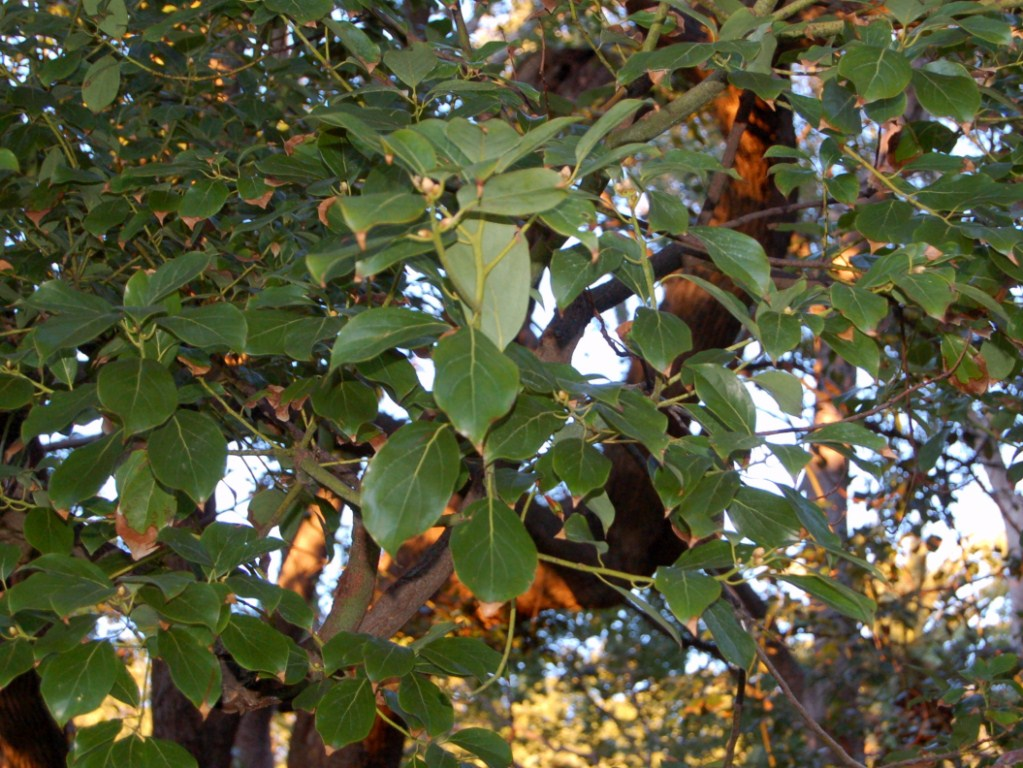
Foliage of Cinnamomum glanduliferum

Cinnamomum glanduliferum is an evergreen tree reaching a height around 5–20 m (16–66 ft). Leaves are shiny, dark green, alternate, petiolated, elliptic to ovate or lanceolate, 6–15 cm (2.4–5.9 in) long and 4–6.5 cm (1.6–2.6 in) wide. Flowers are yellowish and small, about 3 mm (0.12 in) wide. Fruits are black, globose, up to 1 cm (0.39 in) in diameter. Flowering period extends from March through May and the fruits ripen from July to September. The leaves have a characteristic smell and contain camphor and essential oils.

== Distribution ==
This plant is native to China, Bhutan, India, Malaysia, Myanmar, and Nepal.

== Habitat ==
In China, C. glanduliferum grows in broad-leaved forests of mountainous regions, at an elevation around 1,500–2,500 m (4,900–8,200 ft) above sea level, sometimes higher.
