= Eugène Vaniot =

French botanist (1846–1913)

Eugène Vaniot (Gentilly, Val-de-Marne, 12 September 1845 – Le Mans, 6 February 1913) was a French priest and botanist.

With Hector Léveillé, he described more than two thousand species of plants. He was a member of the Academy of Botanical Geography.
