= Augustin Abel Hector Léveillé =

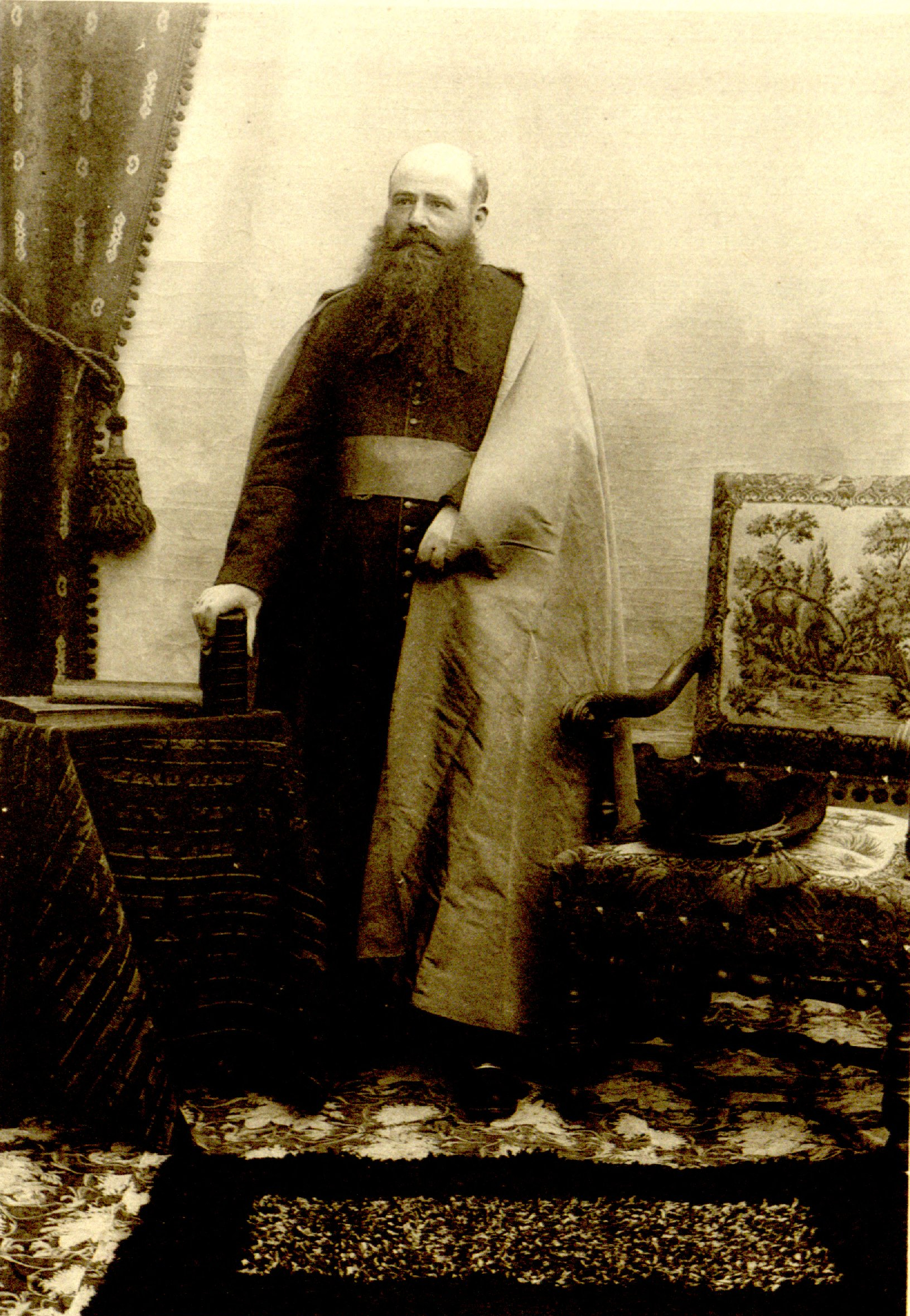
Augustin Abel Hector Léveillé (1864-1918)

Augustin Abel Hector Léveillé (13 March 1864, in Le Mans – 25 November 1918) was a French botanist and clergyman.

He attended medical school prior to entering into the priesthood. In 1887 he traveled to India as a missionary, being appointed as a professor of natural history at the College of Pondicherry. In 1891 he returned to France for health reasons, settling in his hometown of Le Mans.

Following a meeting with botanist Adrien René Franchet in 1900, he agreed to perform studies on the many thousands of plant specimens sent by collectors from the Far East. From these shipments Léveillé is credited with describing around 2000 new species, with many of the plants being co-described along with Father Eugène Vaniot (1846–1913).

In 1892 he founded the magazine Le Monde des Plantes, serving as its director until his death. During the same year he founded the Académie internationale de géographie botanique (International Academy of Botanical Geography). His herbarium was acquired by Scottish botanist George Forrest, a collector in Yunnan.

Numerous species are named in his honor, as well as the genus Leveillea (family Asteraceae), described by Eugène Vaniot in 1903.

== Published works ==
- Les Carex du Japon, (with Eugène Vaniot), 1901 - Carex of Japan.
- Les Rhododendrons de la Chine, 1903 - Rhododendrons of China.
- Tableau analytique de la flore française, 1906 - Analytic tableau of French flora.
- Les Épilobes du Japon, 1907 - Epilobium from Japan.
- Iconographie du genre epilobium, 1910 (with Gonzalve de Cordoue) - Iconography of the genus Epilobium.¨
- Flore du Kouy Tcheou, 1915 - Flora of Guizhou
- Dictionnaire inventoriel de la flore française, 1916 - Inventorial dictionary of French flora.
- Catalogue illustré et alphabetique des plantes du Seu Tchouen /par Hector Léveillé, 1918 - Illustrated and alphabetized catalog of plants from Seu Tchouen.
