= Húng lìu =

Spice mixture found in Vietnamese cuisine

Húng lìu, named after basil (Vietnamese: húng tây), is a spice mixture of four or five spices found in Vietnamese cuisine.

== Ingredients ==
Húng lìu typically consists of four ingredients ground into a fine powder:

- Chinese cinnamon (as opposed to Saigon cinnamon)
- Star anise
- Thảo quả (Amomum tsao-ko)
- Clove

Some recipes call for five ingredients, with the addition of basil seeds.

Less common ingredients may include:

- Fennel
- Ngọc khấu (Myristica fragrans)
- Black pepper
- Zest of Citrus deliciosa Tenore (quýt trần bì or quýt Hương Cần, a willowleaf Mandarin orange)
- Ngò gai seeds (Eryngium foetidum)

== Usage ==
In northern Vietnam, húng lìu is typically used on roasted foods, such as roasted pig and crunchy coated peanuts (lạc rang húng lìu). Húng lìu and five-spice powder have similar ingredients and can be used interchangeably on meat dishes. Húng lìu differs from the more well-known Cantonese blend in the portions of each ingredient, thus producing a distinct taste.

In the late 1920s, various phở vendors experimented with húng lìu as part of a short-lived "phở cải lương" trend.
