= Bắc Trà My district =

Coordinates: 15°20′04″N 108°12′35″E

Bắc Trà My district Huyện Bắc Trà My
- District
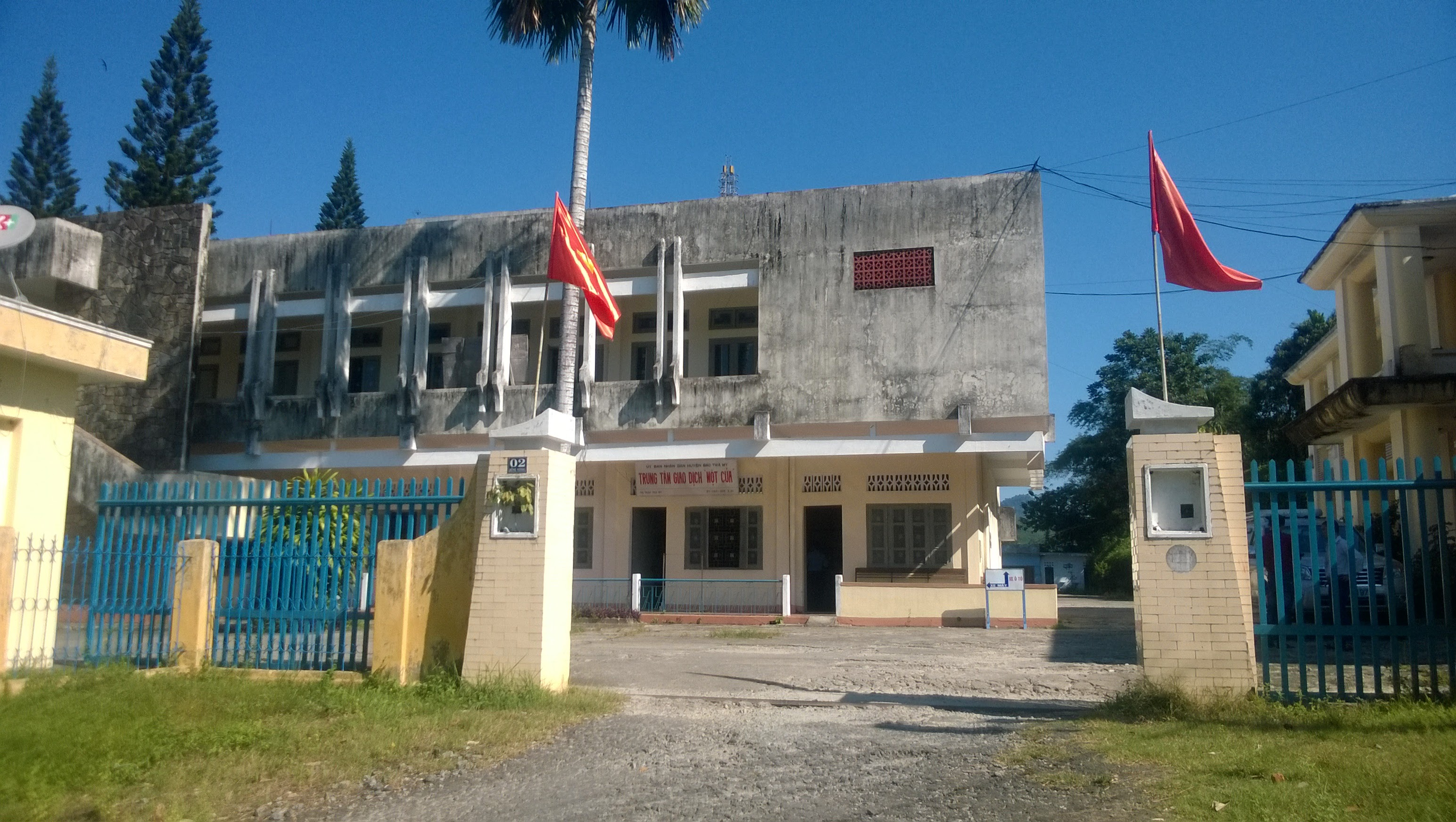
- People's Committee of Bắc Trà My district, Quang Nam

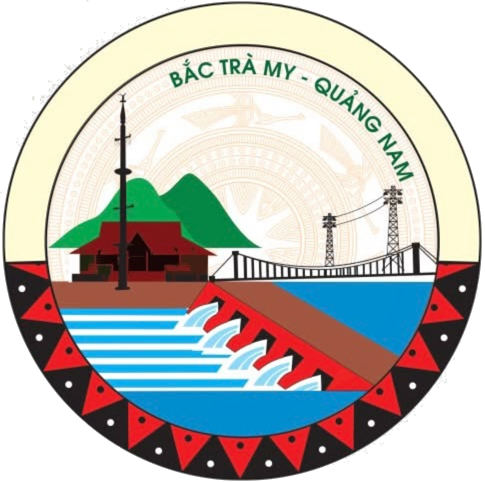
- Seal
- Interactive map of Bắc Trà My district
- Country: Vietnam
- Region: South Central Coast
- Province: Quảng Nam
- Capital: Trà My

Area
  - Total: 318 sq mi (823 km^{2})

Population (2003)
  - Total: 42,170
- Time zone: UTC+7 (Indochina Time)

Bắc Trà My is a district (huyện) of Quảng Nam province in the South Central Coast region of Vietnam. The district is known for its production of Saigon Cinnamon. As of 2003 the district had a population of 21,139. The district covers an area of 823 km^{2}. The district capital lies at Trà My.

== Climate ==
Climate data for Trà My, Bắc Trà My District
Month	Jan	Feb	Mar	Apr	May	Jun	Jul	Aug	Sep	Oct	Nov	Dec	Year
Record high °C (°F)	34.1 (93.4)	36.1 (97.0)	37.9 (100.2)	40.6 (105.1)	40.3 (104.5)	38.9 (102.0)	39.3 (102.7)	39.8 (103.6)	36.7 (98.1)	34.1 (93.4)	33.7 (92.7)	32.0 (89.6)	40.6 (105.1)
Mean daily maximum °C (°F)	24.7 (76.5)	27.0 (80.6)	30.0 (86.0)	32.9 (91.2)	33.8 (92.8)	33.9 (93.0)	33.7 (92.7)	33.5 (92.3)	31.6 (88.9)	28.8 (83.8)	26.2 (79.2)	23.9 (75.0)	30.0 (86.0)
Daily mean °C (°F)	20.7 (69.3)	22.1 (71.8)	24.1 (75.4)	26.1 (79.0)	26.9 (80.4)	27.2 (81.0)	27.0 (80.6)	26.9 (80.4)	25.9 (78.6)	24.4 (75.9)	22.8 (73.0)	20.8 (69.4)	24.5 (76.1)
Mean daily minimum °C (°F)	18.4 (65.1)	19.2 (66.6)	20.6 (69.1)	22.3 (72.1)	23.2 (73.8)	23.5 (74.3)	23.2 (73.8)	23.3 (73.9)	23.0 (73.4)	22.1 (71.8)	20.9 (69.6)	19.0 (66.2)	21.6 (70.9)
Record low °C (°F)	11.8 (53.2)	12.9 (55.2)	12.9 (55.2)	16.9 (62.4)	17.3 (63.1)	19.3 (66.7)	19.6 (67.3)	20.2 (68.4)	19.0 (66.2)	15.1 (59.2)	12.0 (53.6)	10.4 (50.7)	10.4 (50.7)
Average precipitation mm (inches)	151.3 (5.96)	74.7 (2.94)	86.0 (3.39)	102.2 (4.02)	276.3 (10.88)	216.3 (8.52)	176.8 (6.96)	217.5 (8.56)	417.6 (16.44)	937.0 (36.89)	1,030.8 (40.58)	497.8 (19.60)	4,184.1 (164.73)
Average rainy days	15.5	9.4	8.4	10.5	18.1	15.4	15.4	15.6	19.6	22.0	22.4	22.1	194.3
Average relative humidity (%)	90.0	88.1	85.5	84.1	84.5	84.4	84.5	84.8	87.7	90.4	92.0	92.4	87.5
Mean monthly sunshine hours	98.1	132.9	179.4	194.1	211.5	199.5	202.1	194.7	156.0	117.5	80.0	59.0	1,827.5
Source: Vietnam Institute for Building Science and Technology
