= Five-spice powder =

Spice mixture used in Chinese cuisine

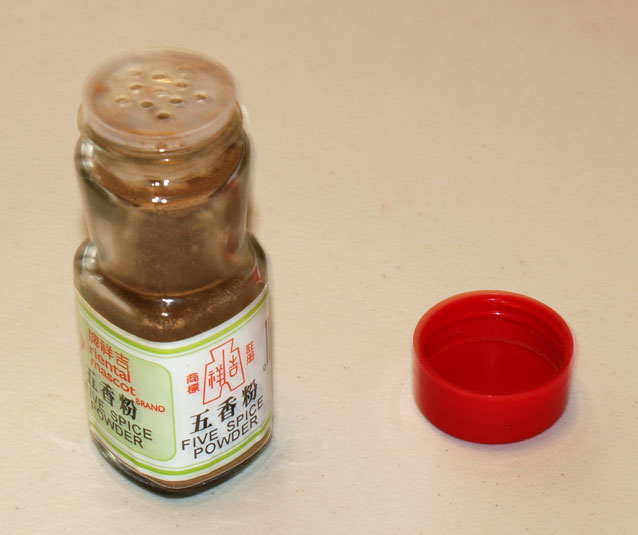
- Five-spice powder

Chinese name
- Chinese: 五香粉
- Literal meaning: "five-spice powder"
Transcriptions
Standard Mandarin
- Hanyu Pinyin: wǔxiāng fěn
- IPA: [ù.ɕjáŋ fə̀n]
Yue: Cantonese
- Yale Romanization: ńgh hēung fán
- Jyutping: ng5 hoeng1 fan2
- IPA: [ŋ hœŋ˥ fɐn˧˥]
Southern Min
- Hokkien POJ: ngó͘-hiong-hún

Vietnamese name
- Vietnamese: ngũ vị hương
- Chữ Hán: 五味香

Khmer name
- Khmer: ម្សៅគ្រឿងទេសប្រាំ

Five-spice powder (Chinese: 五香粉; pinyin: wǔxiāng fěn) is a spice mixture of five or more spices—commonly star anise, cloves, Chinese cinnamon, Sichuan pepper, and fennel seeds—used predominantly in almost all branches of Chinese cuisine. The five flavors of the spices reflect the five traditional Chinese elements (wood, fire, earth, metal, and water) and flavors (sweet, bitter, sour, salty, and savory). The addition of eight other spices creates thirteen-spice powder (十三香), which is used less commonly.

== List of ingredients ==
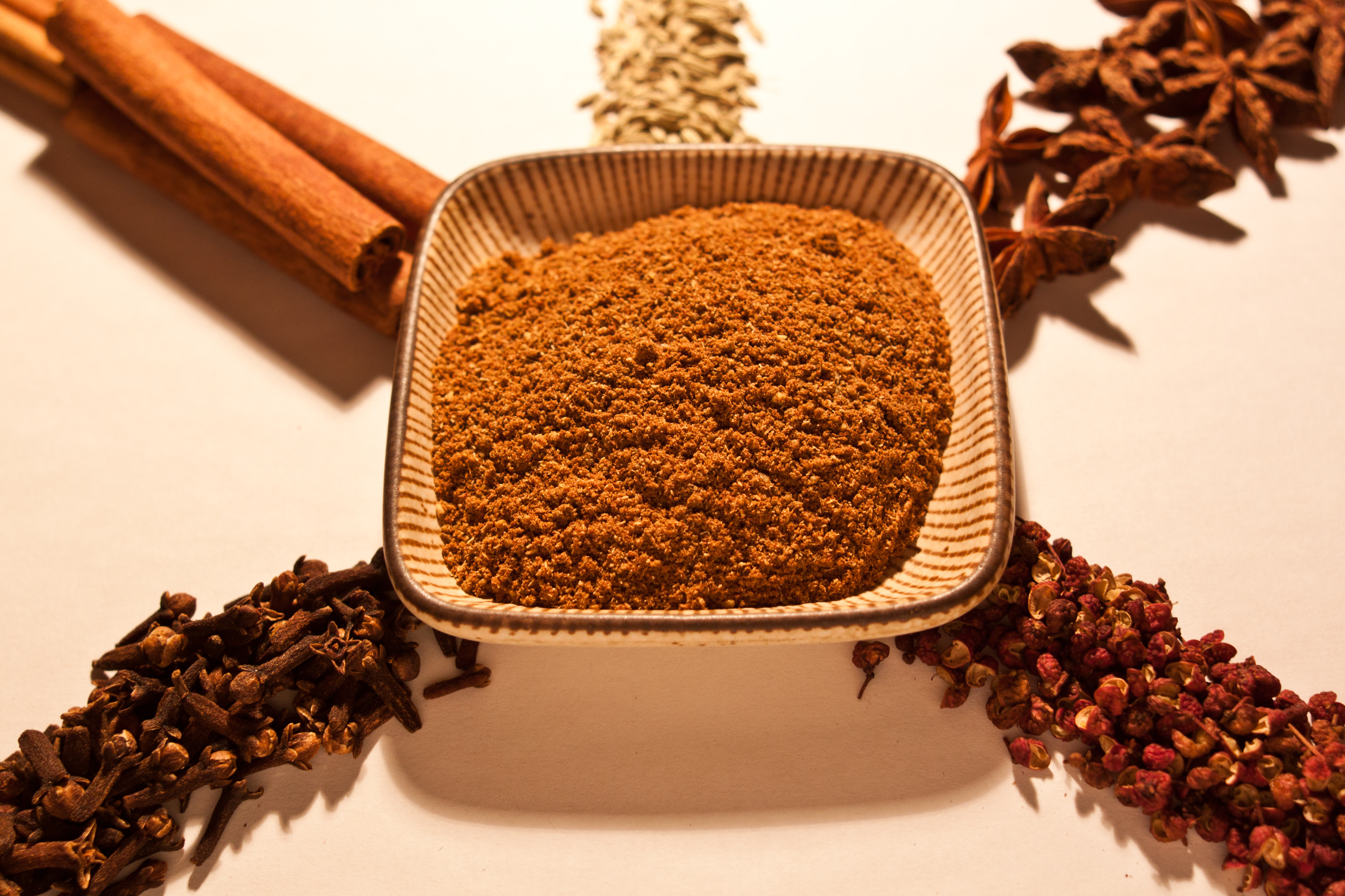
A common mix for ground five-spice powder (center) is (clockwise from top left) cinnamon, fennel seeds, star anise, Sichuan peppercorns and cloves.

While there are many variants, a common mix is:

- Star anise (bājiǎo 八角)
- Fennel seeds (xiǎohuíxiāng 小茴香)
- Cloves (dīngxiāng 丁香)
- Chinese cinnamon (ròuguì 肉桂)
- Sichuan pepper (huājiāo 花椒)

Other recipes may contain anise seed, ginger root, nutmeg, turmeric, Amomum villosum pods (shārén 砂仁), Amomum cardamomum pods (báidòukòu 白豆蔻), licorice, Mandarin orange peel or galangal.

In Southern China, Cinnamomum loureiroi and Mandarin orange peel are commonly used as substitutes for Cinnamomum cassia and cloves respectively. These ingredients collectively produce southern five-spice powder's distinctive, slightly different flavor profile.

== Use ==
Five-spice powder is used as a spice rub for chicken, duck, goose, pork, and seafood, in red cooking recipes, or added to the breading for fried foods. Five-spice powder is used in recipes for Cantonese roasted duck, as well as beef stew. Canned spiced pork cubes are very popular as well. Five-spice powder is used as a marinade for Vietnamese broiled chicken. The five-spice powder mixture has followed the Chinese diaspora and has been incorporated into other national cuisines throughout Asia.

A seasoned salt can be easily made by dry-roasting common salt with five-spice powder under low heat in a dry pan until the spice and salt are well mixed.

Five-spice powder can also add complexity and savoriness to sweets and savory dishes alike.

It has a traditional use as an antiseptic and a cure for indigestion. In one study, the potential antioxidant capacities of Chinese five-spice powder (consisting of Sichuan pepper, fennel seed, cinnamon, star anise, and clove) with varying proportion of individual spice ingredients was investigated through four standard methods. The results suggest that clove is the major contributor to the high antioxidant capacities of the five-spice powder, whereas the other four ingredients contribute only to the flavor.

== See also ==
- Curry powder
- Húng lìu
- List of culinary herbs and spices
- Mala (seasoning)
- Ngo hiang
- Panch phoron
- Shichimi
