= Phở Hùng =

Pair of Vietnamese restaurants in Portland, Oregon, U.S.

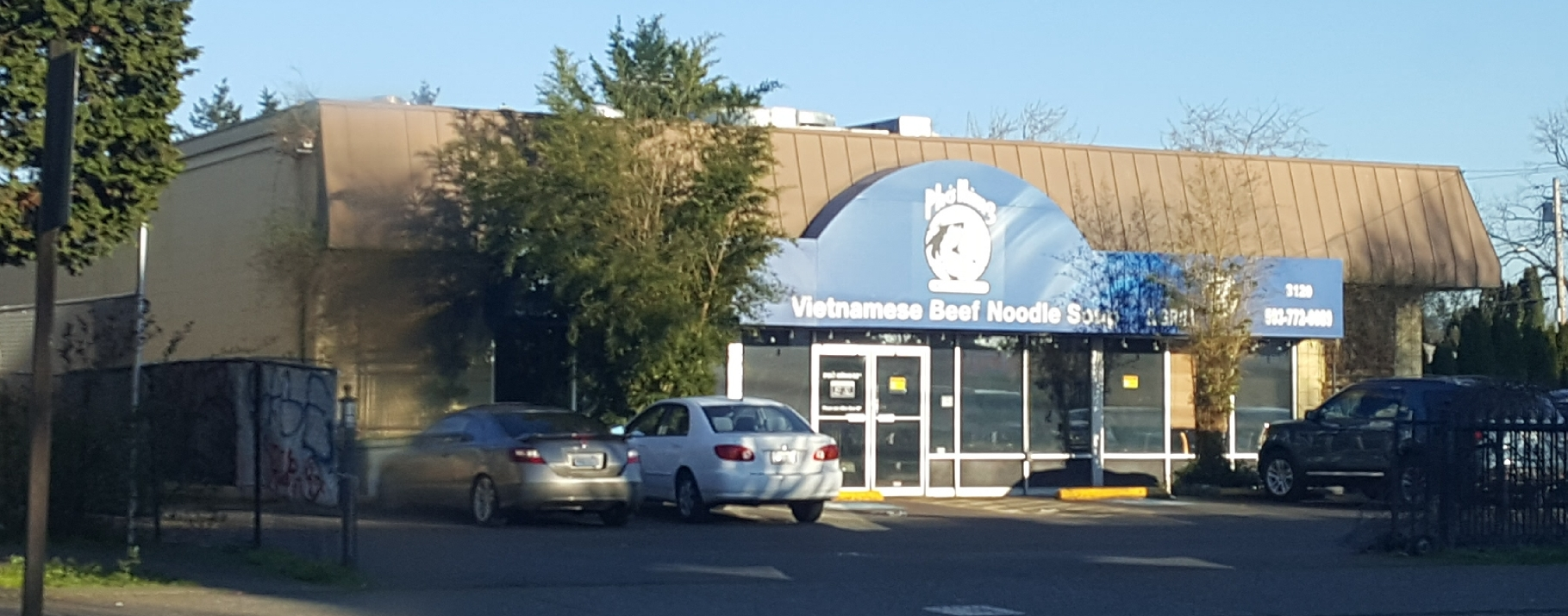
- Exterior of the restaurant on 82nd Avenue in 2022
- Interactive map of Phở Hùng

Restaurant information
- Food type: Vietnamese
- Location: 3120 SE 82nd Ave, Portland, Multnomah, Oregon, 97266, United States
- Coordinates: 45.4977°N 122.6140°W

Phở Hùng is a pair of Vietnamese restaurants in Portland, Oregon, United States. The two establishments are operated by different owners but share a name, logo, and menu primarily focused on pho. Both are located in southeast Portland; the older restaurant has operated on Powell Boulevard since 1990, and the other, sometimes called Phở Hùng 82, is on 82nd Avenue. Previously, a Phở Hùng restaurant operated on Fremont Street in northeast Portland.

== Description ==
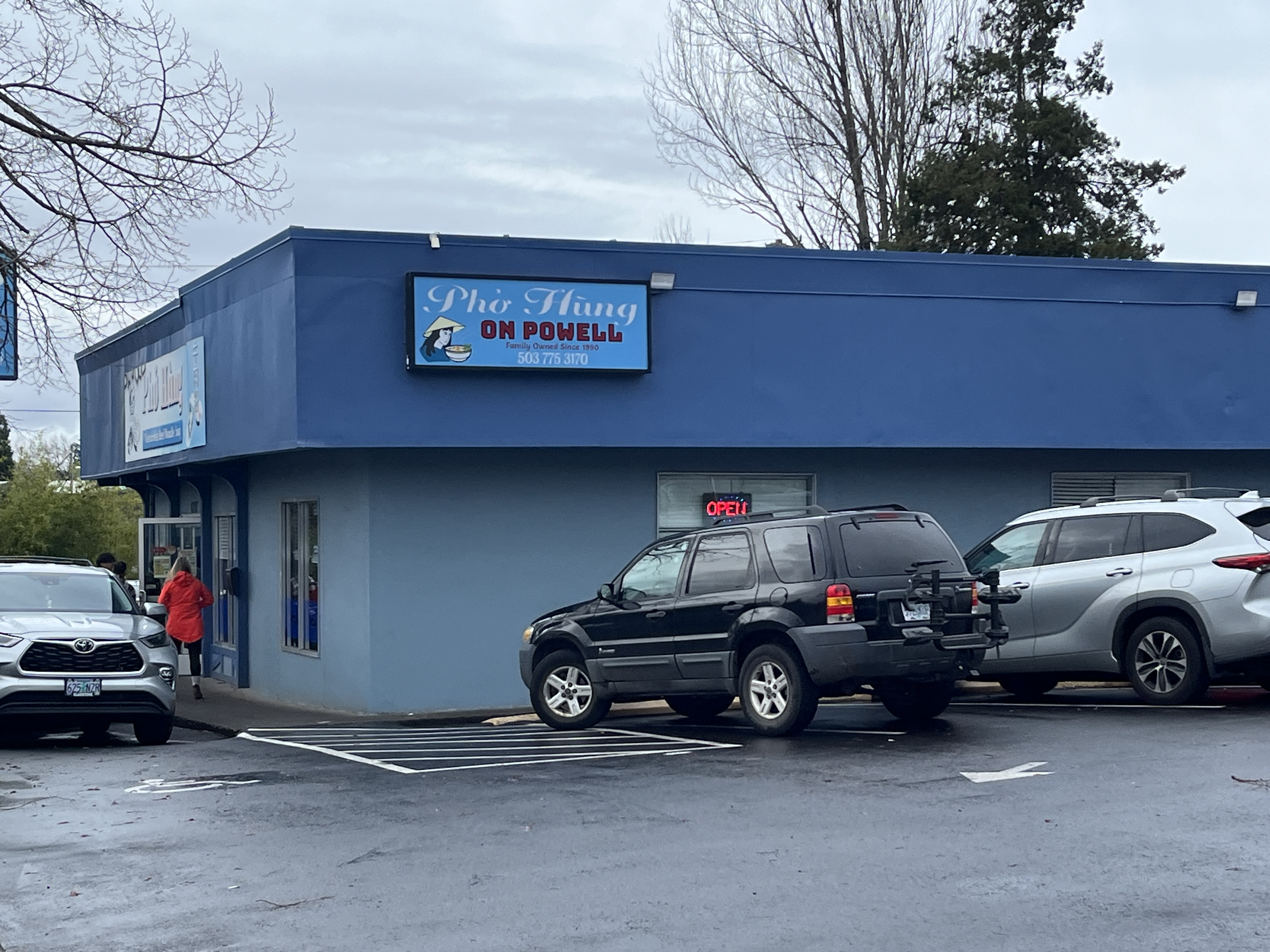
Exterior of the Powell Boulevard location in 2024

Phở Hùng is a pair of Vietnamese restaurants in southeast Portland. The two establishments share a name, logo, and menu, but operate under different ownership. The older restaurant is on Powell Boulevard, just north of the Richmond neighborhood's southern boundary with Creston-Kenilworth. The other restaurant, sometimes called Phở Hùng 82, is on 82nd Avenue, in the Powellhurst-Gilbert neighborhood. Phở Hùng 82 has paper lanterns, televisions, and large windows looking out to bamboo.

The menu has categories such as "Adventurer's Choice" and "For Beginners". It includes dac biet ("Special Super Bowl"), which is pho with steak, brisket, soft tendon, honeycomb tripe, and meatballs in a broth with scallions. The restaurants have also served chicken pho ga, egg rolls, a vegetarian pho with broccoli and fried tofu, and the beef noodle soup bún bò Huế. Pho is served with a side of Thai basil, bean sprouts, jalapeños, and lime. Available condiments include black pepper, chili oil, chili paste, crushed red pepper, fish sauce, hoisin, and Sriracha. Che ba mau is described as a "parfaitlike" drink with mung and red beans, coconut milk, and "ogar strip" (or jellies). Other drink options include avocado shakes, bubble tea, and Vietnamese coffee.

== History ==
The original restaurant has operated on Powell Boulevard since 1990. An outpost operated on Fremont Street in northeast Portland, starting in 1995. The building later housed the Vietnamese restaurant Phở Gabo.

== Reception ==
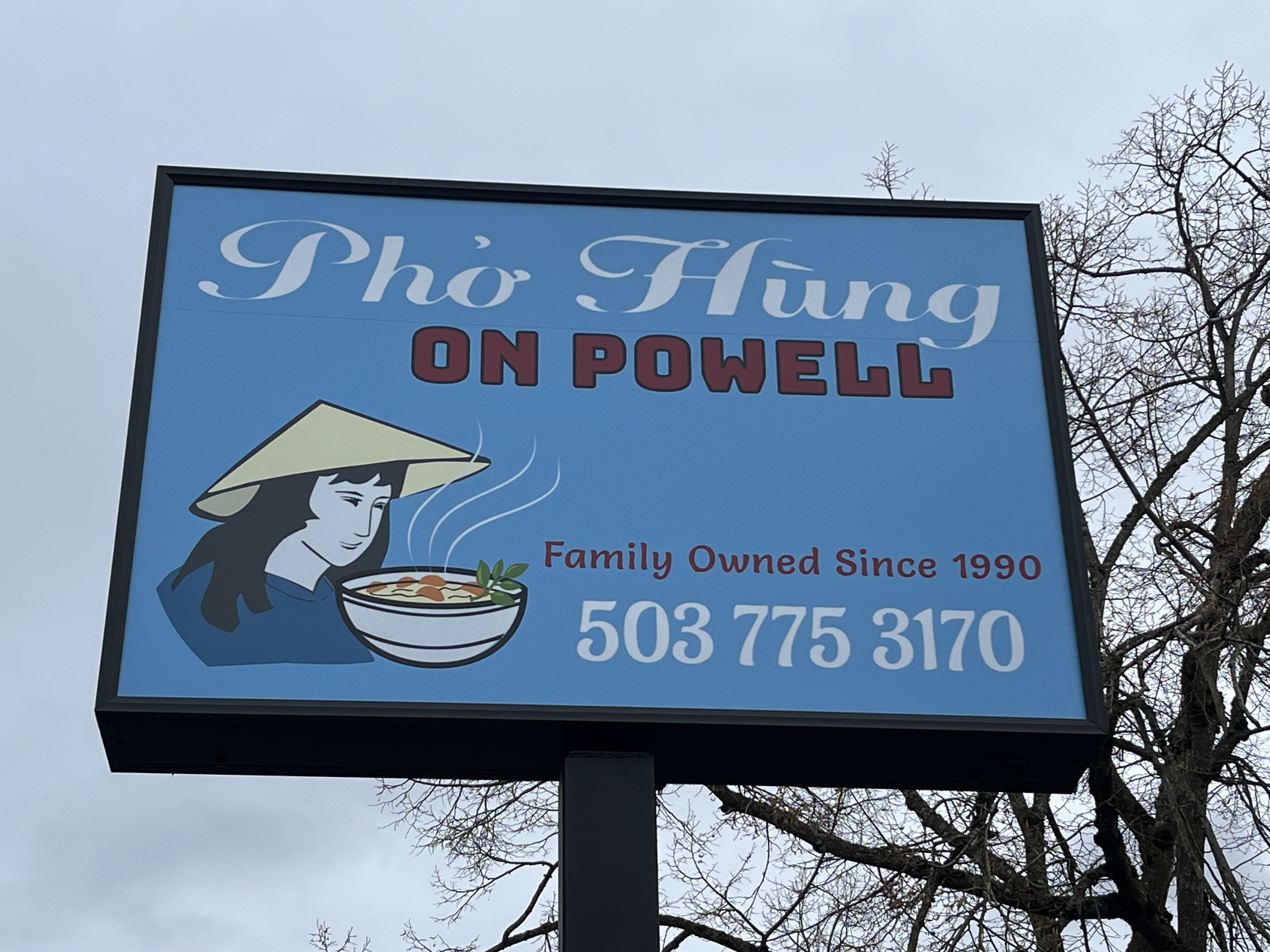
Sign for the Powell Boulevard location, 2024

In 2006, writers for the Portland Mercury said Phở Hùng was "arguably the best all-around place for pho" in the city. Lance Chess and Marjorie Skinner said the restaurant "carries on tradition, with hefty portions for cheap" and is among the "more authentic" eateries, "a trait carried out in the entire menu".

In 2017, Michael Russell of The Oregonian said of Phở Hùng had friendly service but needed "sprucing up". He called the broth "fine", with "not quite enough depth of flavor". He said the noodles were "nicely cooked, but lacking flavor", and the toppings were sparse. Russell said of Phở Hùng 82: "The pho is a standout, with a balanced broth that brings the savory beef more than any individual spice, plus the most fattiest fatty brisket we've found so far." He called the broth "well balanced", the beef balls and tripe "good", the noodles "not particularly special", and the ambiance "pleasant and lively".

Nathan Williams included the Powell Street location in Eater Portland's 2023 overview of recommended restaurants in Creston-Kenilworth. Phở Hùng was a runner-up in the Best Vietnamese Restaurant category of Willamette Week's annual 'Best of Portland' readers' poll in 2024. It was a finalist in the same category in 2025. The restaurant is one of politician Khanh Pham's favorites.

== See also ==
- List of Vietnamese restaurants
