= Phở Gabo =

Chain of Vietnamese restaurants in the U.S. state of Oregon

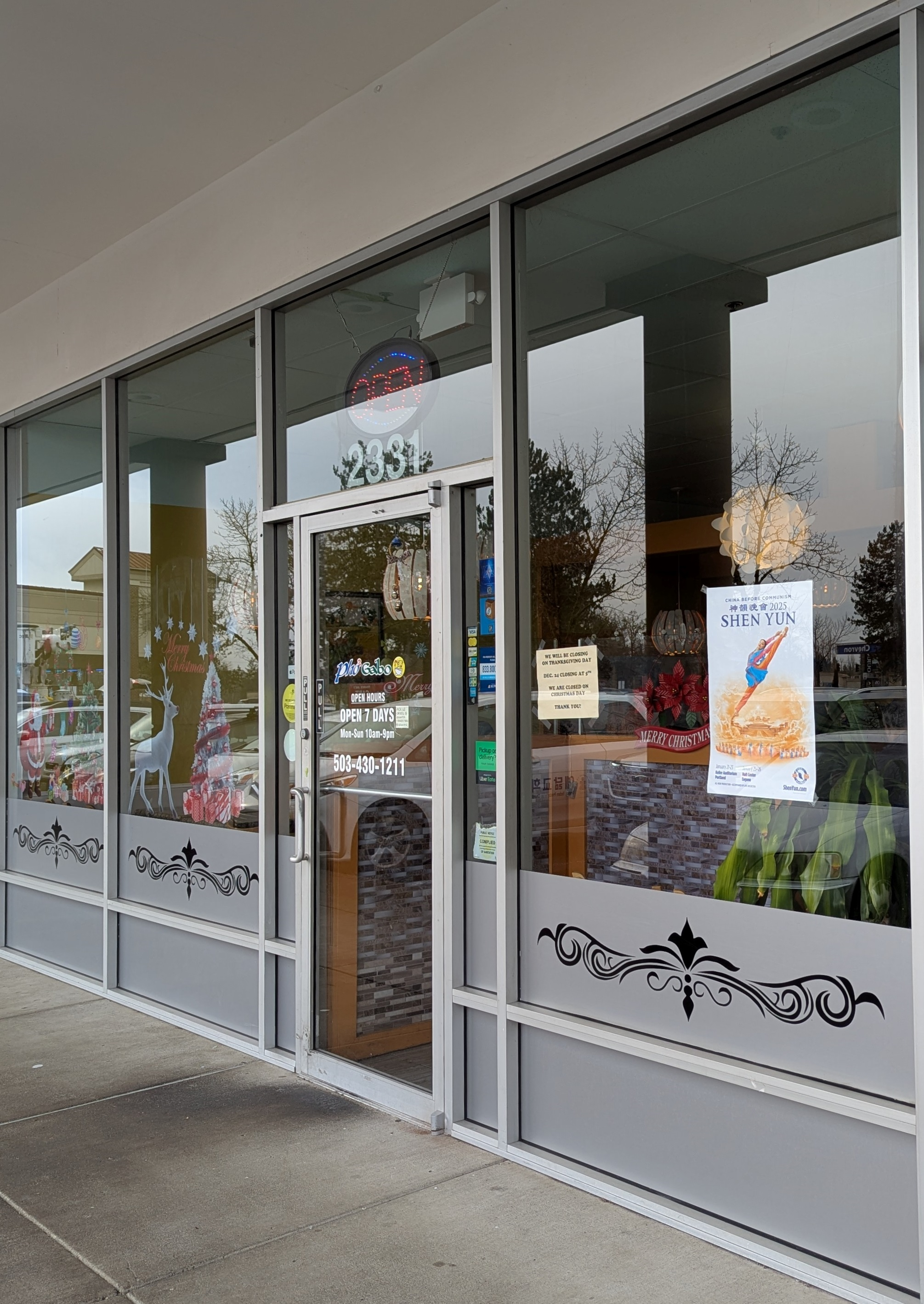
- Phở Gabo in Hillsboro, Oregon, 2024
- Interactive map of Phở Gabo

Restaurant information
- Owner: Eddie Dong
- Food type: Vietnamese
- Location: Hillsboro; Happy Valley, Oregon, United States
- Coordinates: 45.5372°N 122.8696°W
- Website: phogabo.com

Phở Gabo is a small chain of Vietnamese restaurants in the Portland metropolitan area, in the U.S. state of Oregon. The business is owned by Eddie Dong and has operated in Hillsboro since 2015 and Happy Valley since 2022. Previously, a third location operated in northeast Portland's Roseway neighborhood from 2018 to 2024. It closed due to a series of odor complaints by an anonymous neighbor, resulting in multiple visits from inspectors, fines, and later a change to the city's odor code.

The Portland location's closure received pushback by some community groups and politicians, including the Asian Pacific American Network of Oregon and the Oregon Restaurant and Lodging Association. City commissioner Carmen Rubio directed the Bureau of Development Services to suspend the inspection of odor complaints about restaurants, a decision praised by Vietnamese American state legislators Daniel Nguyen, Hoa Nguyen, Hai Pham, Khanh Pham, and Thuy Tran. In April 2024, Dong announced plans to sue the city for discriminatory code enforcement.

== Description ==
The Vietnamese restaurant chain Phở Gabo has operated three locations in the Portland metropolitan area. The business has locations in Happy Valley and Hillsboro, and previously operated at the intersection of 73rd Avenue and Fremont Street in northeast Portland's Roseway neighborhood. The menu includes beef noodle soup.

== History ==
Phở Gabo is owned by Eddie Dong. The Hillsboro, Portland, and Happy Valley locations opened in 2015, 2018, and 2022, respectively. The Portland location operated in the space previously occupied by Phở Hùng, starting in 1995.

=== Portland closure ===
In September 2022, Dong received a notice that the Portland restaurant "was in violation of the zoning code that prohibits odors impacting a nearby residential neighborhood", according to Willamette Week. The restaurant had not received any complaints during its first five years operating, and replaced an Asian restaurant that had operated for approximately three decades. In February 2024, following an eighteen-month-long series of odor complaints filed by an anonymous neighbor to the city's Bureau of Development Services, the location was closed temporarily. A note affixed to the door said, "Due to the city's and the neighborhood's complaints about the smell of the food that we grill and the foods that we serve customers we are temporarily closing this location." Complaints had resulted in a dozen visits from inspectors as well as fines. The location had been broken into nine times over seven years, and the front door had a sign that read, "Please do not break windows/doors. No money inside. Thank you!"

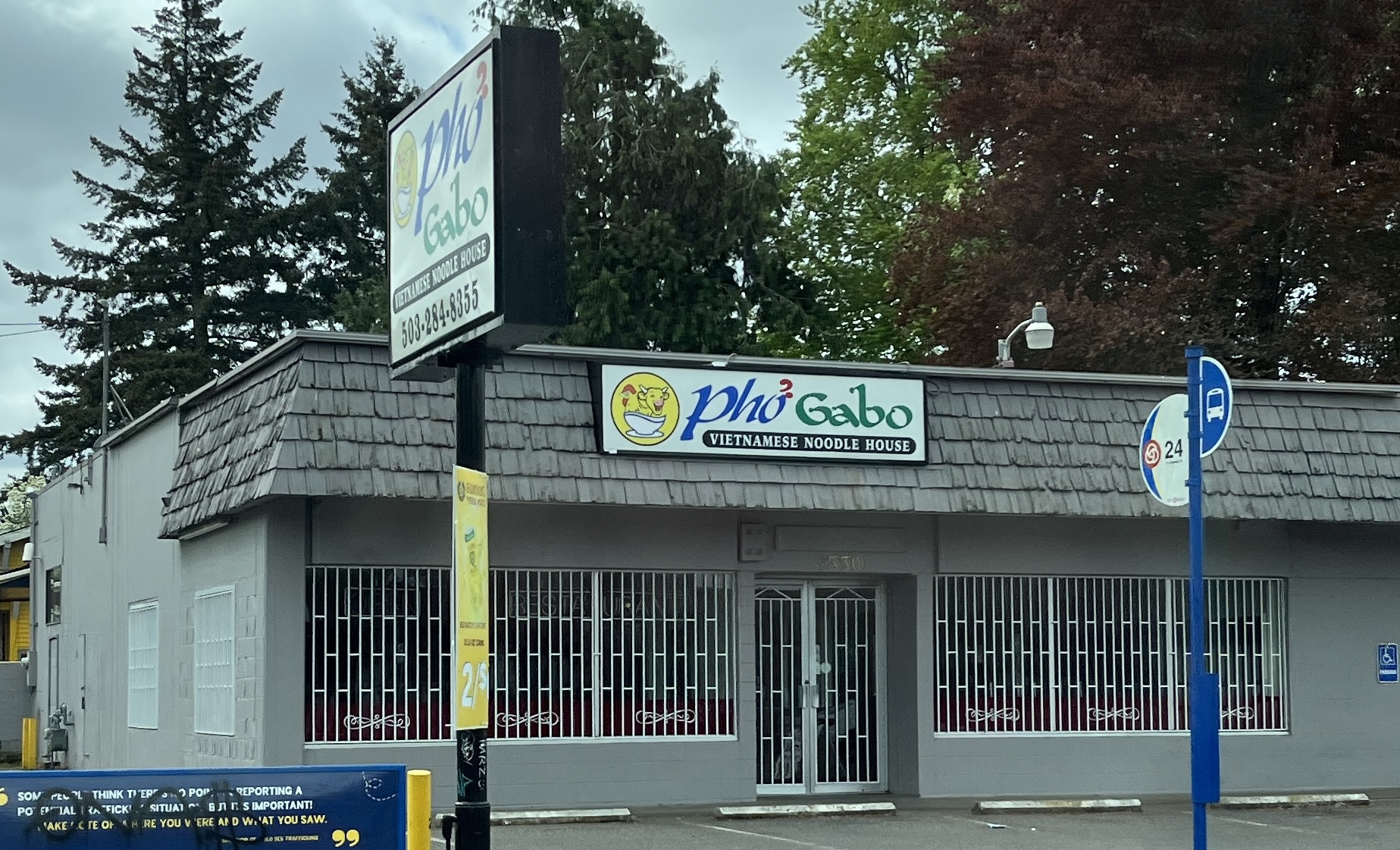
Exterior of the building that housed the restaurant's Portland location, 2025

The Portland location's closure prompted some pushback from the community. The Asian Pacific American Network of Oregon took issue with the closure and said the zoning code "disproportionately impacts the BIPOC-owned businesses that bring vibrancy and cultural diversity to our neighborhoods". The Oregon Restaurant and Lodging Association requested that the city review its "subjective, unfair 'smell' code immediately and cease targeting small restaurants and their owners, many of whom are people from various racial and ethnic backgrounds". Dong reportedly received "messages of support from Vietnamese community organizations and ... heard about City Hall's interest". City commissioner Carmen Rubio directed the bureau to suspend the inspection of odor complaints about restaurants. Additionally, five Vietnamese American state legislators—Daniel Nguyen, Hoa Nguyen, Hai Pham, Khanh Pham, and Thuy Tran—issued a statement about the closure and praising Rubio's decision.

In April 2024, Dong announced plans to sue the city for "economic and noneconomic damages related to the City’s subjective, selective and disproportionate enforcement of city codes", and "discriminatory enforcement of city odor codes". The claim also said Dong "has suffered…reputational harm, fear, humiliation, embarrassment, emotional distress, and loss of his community". The building that housed the Portland restaurant is slated to be sold. The city changed its odor code in November 2024. Dong filed a lawsuit seeking up to $2.4 million in December.

== Reception ==
In 2022, Willamette Week said Phở Gabo was "certainly worth a stop for noodleheads". Michael Russell included the business in The Oregonian's list of the 21 "most painful" restaurant and bar closures of 2024.

== See also ==
- List of restaurant chains in the United States
- List of Vietnamese restaurants
