= Chao long =

Filipino noodle soup dish

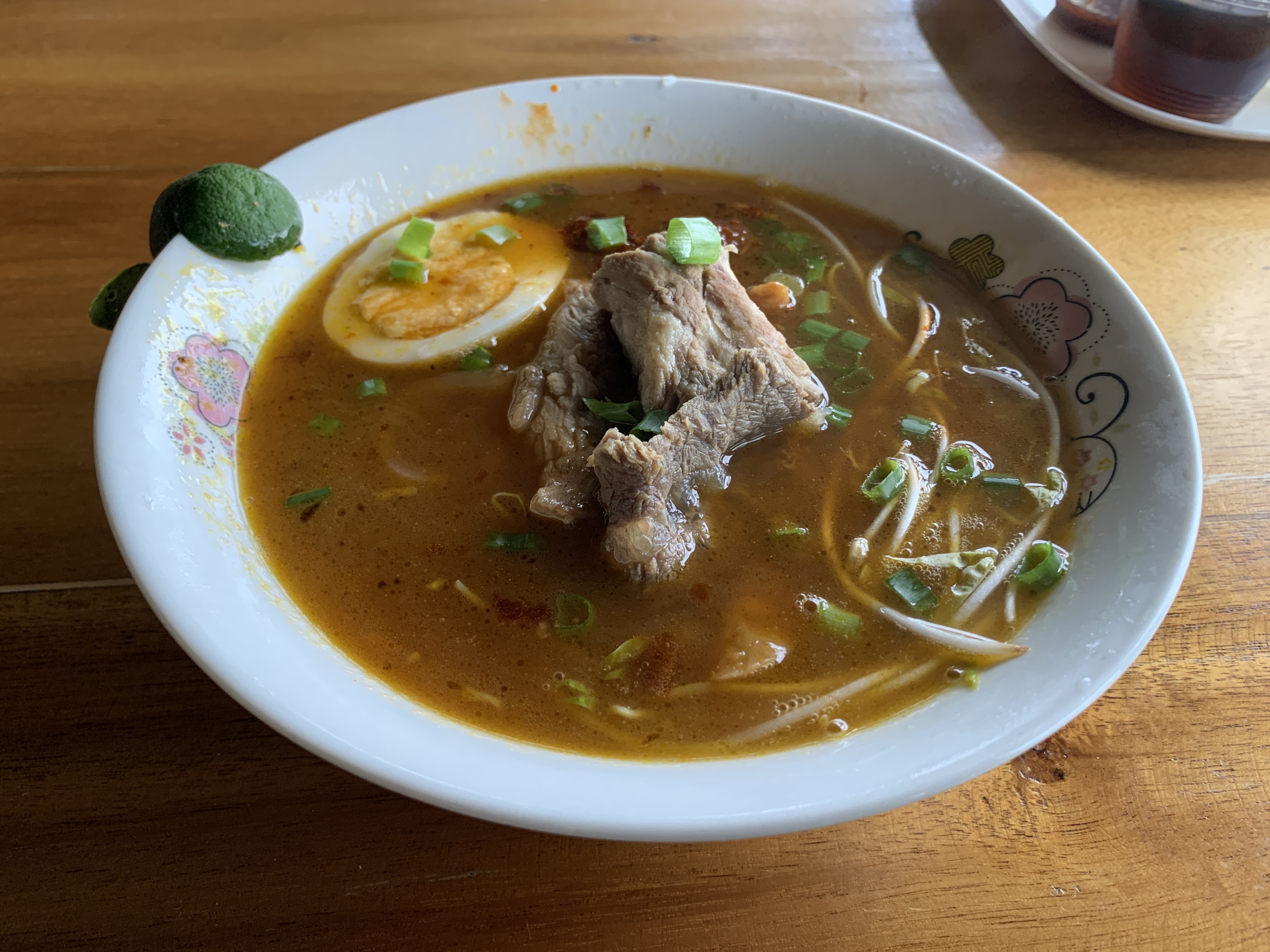
- Alternative names: Filipino chao long
- Course: Main dish
- Place of origin: Philippines
- Region or state: Puerto Princesa, Palawan
- Created by: Vietnamese refugees
- Serving temperature: Hot
- Main ingredients: Rice noodles, beef broth, braised beef, banana ketchup, bean sprouts, calamansi

Chao long is a Filipino noodle soup dish originating in Puerto Princesa, Palawan, Philippines. It is a localized adaptation of Vietnamese noodle soups introduced by Vietnamese refugees in the late 1970s. Over time, the dish evolved into a distinct regional specialty, differing in flavor, ingredients, and preparation from its Vietnamese counterparts.

== History ==
Chao long in the Philippines traces its origins to the arrival of Vietnamese refugees following the end of the Vietnam War in 1975. In 1979, the Philippine government established a Vietnamese refugee camp in Puerto Princesa, Palawan, which housed thousands of displaced people. Along with their customs and traditions, the refugees introduced elements of Vietnamese cuisine to the local population.

The term chao long originally referred to cháo lòng, a Vietnamese rice porridge dish containing pork offal and congealed blood. Vietnamese-owned eateries serving this porridge and other foods became known locally as chalongan (places where chao long was served). Over time, the name came to be associated with a noodle soup dish derived from Vietnamese pho, which gradually adapted to Filipino tastes and ingredients.

== Description ==
Filipino chao long is a beef-based noodle soup served with rice noodles, braised beef, and a richly flavored broth. Unlike traditional Vietnamese pho, the Filipino version is known for its slightly sweet, savory profile and darker, reddish broth. The dish is typically garnished with bean sprouts, chopped onions, and fresh herbs, and is served with calamansi on the side rather than lime.

== Preparation ==
Preparation methods vary by household and restaurant, but generally involve simmering beef bones to create a rich broth. Braised beef is cooked separately and later added to the soup. Banana ketchup and tomato paste are incorporated into the broth, giving it a distinctive Filipino flavor profile. Cooked rice noodles are placed in a bowl and topped with beef and hot broth, then finished with fresh garnishes.

== See also ==
- Pho
