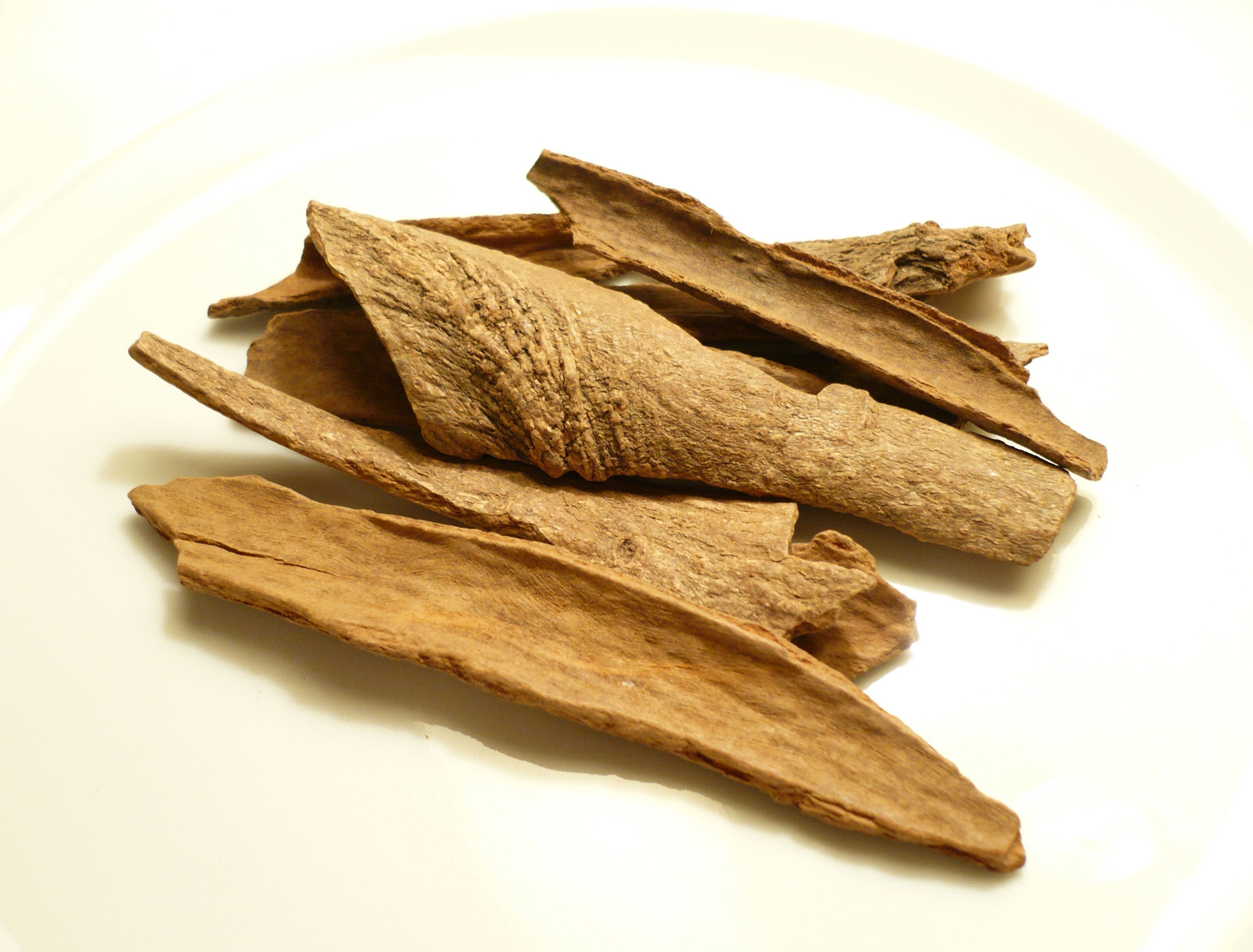

Conservation status
- Endangered (IUCN 3.1)

Scientific classification
- Kingdom: Plantae
- Clade: Tracheophytes
- Clade: Angiosperms
- Clade: Magnoliids
- Order: Laurales
- Family: Lauraceae
- Genus: Cinnamomum
- Species: C. loureiroi

Binomial name
- Cinnamomum loureiroi Nees

Synonyms
- Cinnamomum obtusifolium var. loureiroi (Nees) Perrier & Eberh.; Laurus cinnamomum Lour., nom. illeg. homonym. post.

= Saigon cinnamon =

Species of flowering plant

Saigon cinnamon (Cinnamomum loureiroi, also known as Vietnamese cinnamon or Vietnamese cassia and quế Trà My, quế Thanh, quế Quỳ (Quỳ Châu, Quỳ Hợp) or quế Trà Bồng in Vietnam) is an evergreen tree indigenous to mainland Southeast Asia. Saigon cinnamon is more closely related to cassia (C. cassia) than to Ceylon cinnamon (C. verum), though in the same genus as both. Saigon cinnamon has 1–5% essential oil content and 25% cinnamaldehyde in essential oil. Consequently, among the species, Saigon cinnamon commands a relatively high price.

The scientific name was originally spelled as Cinnamomum loureirii, but because the species is named after the botanist João de Loureiro, this is to be treated under the ICN as an orthographic error for the correctly derived spelling of loureiroi.

Saigon cinnamon contains one of the highest concentrations of coumarin among the commercially important cinnamon species. A review of analytical studies reported that an authenticated sample of Cinnamomum loureiroi contained 6.97 g/kg (0.697% by weight) of coumarin, although commercial samples vary considerably. Coumarin is moderately toxic to the liver and kidneys, and minor neurological dysfunction was found in children exposed to coumarin during pregnancy.

== Production and uses ==
Saigon cinnamon is produced primarily in Vietnam, both for domestic use and export. The Vietnam War disrupted production, but since the beginning of the 21st century, Vietnam has resumed export of the spice, including to the United States, where it was unavailable for nearly 20 years. Although it is called Saigon cinnamon, it is not produced in the area around the southern city of Ho Chi Minh City (formerly Saigon), but instead in the Central Highlands regions of the country, particularly the Quảng Ngãi Province of central Vietnam.

Saigon cinnamon is used primarily for its aromatic bark, which has a taste quite similar to that of C. cassia, but with a more pronounced and complex aroma.

In Vietnamese cuisine, Saigon cinnamon bark is an important ingredient in the broth used to make phở, a popular noodle soup dish.

== Gallery ==
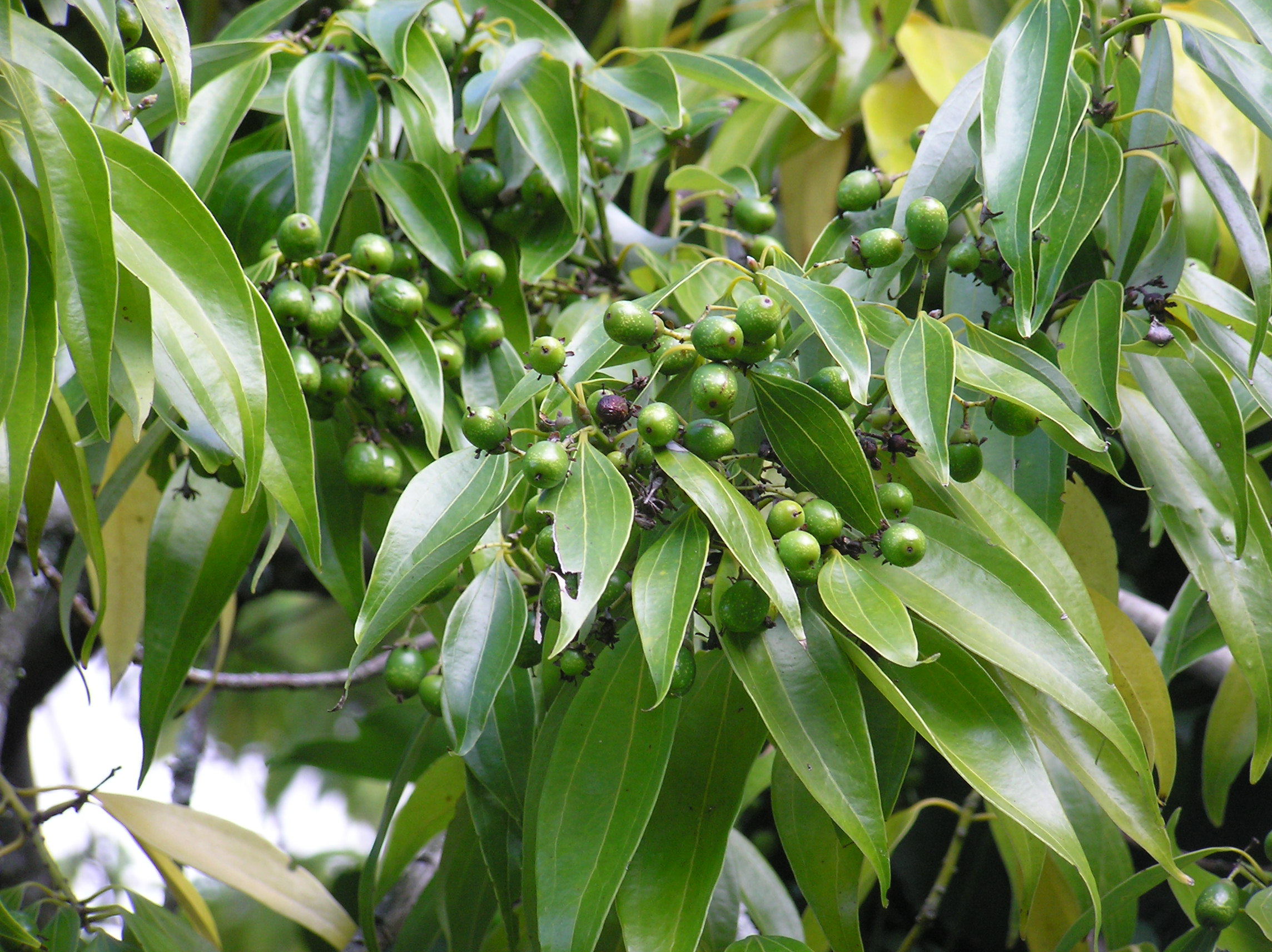

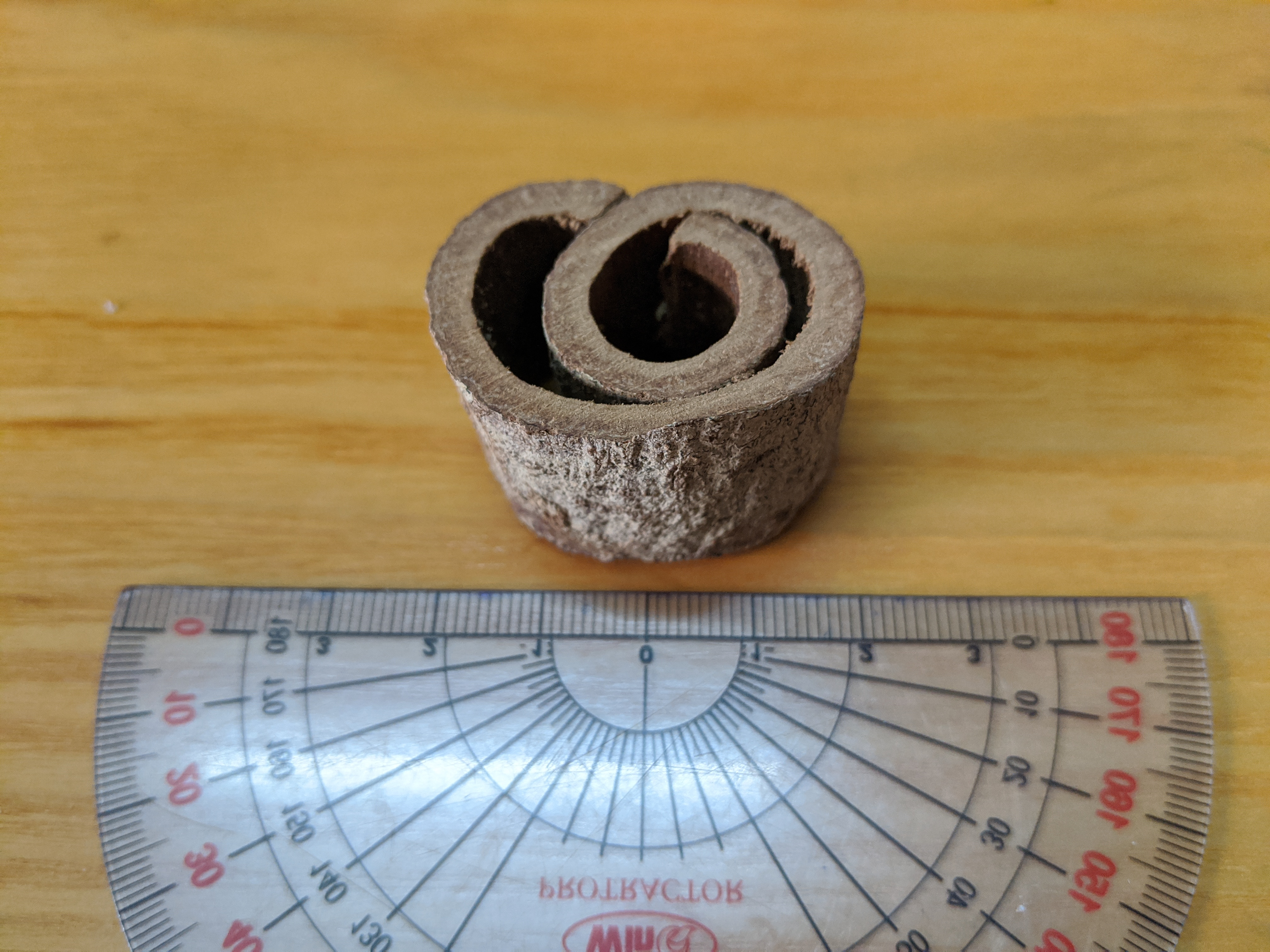
Vietnam cinnamon bark collected in Bắc Trà My, Quảng Nam, Vietnam

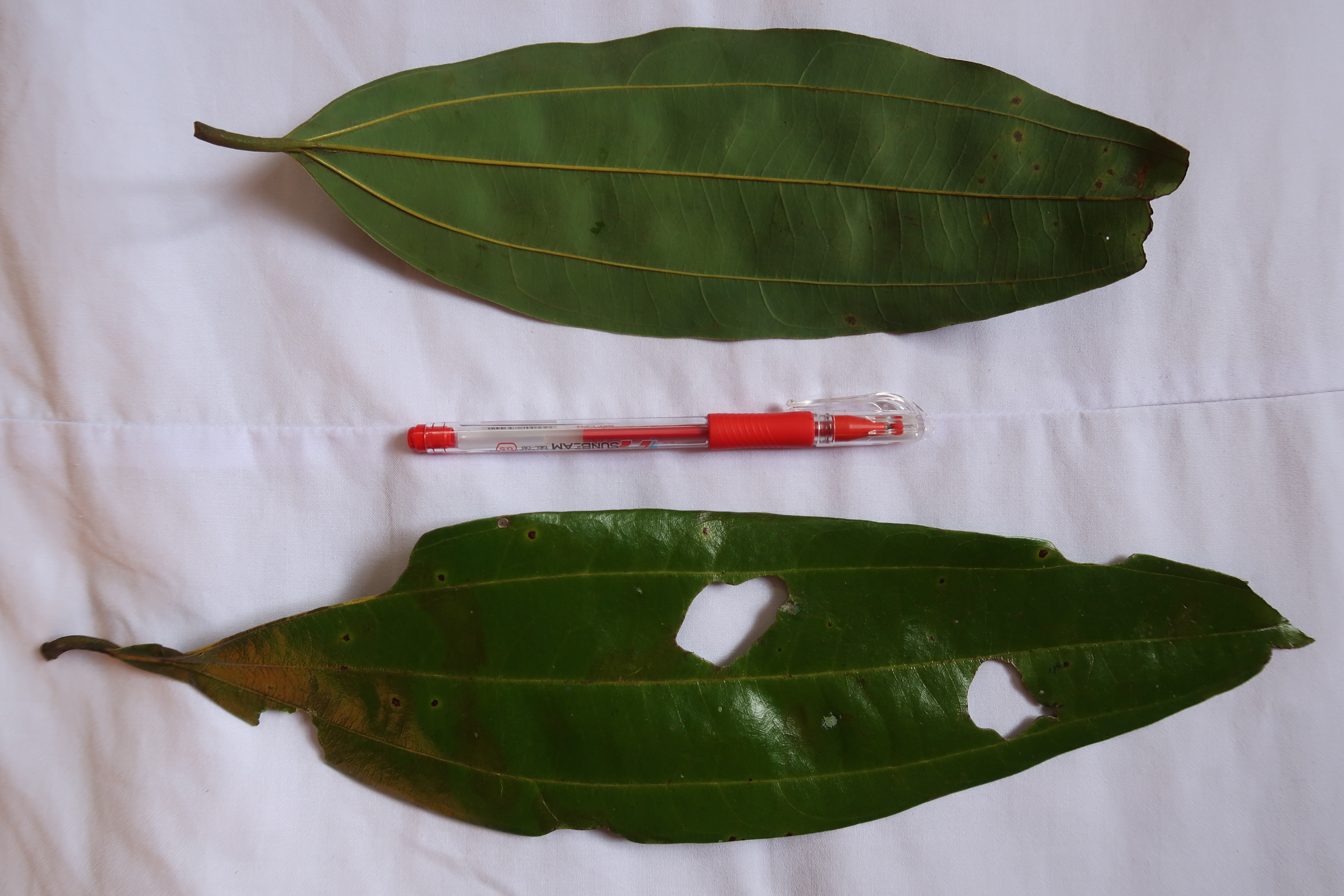
Vietnam cinnamon leaves collected in Bắc Trà My, Quảng Nam, Vietnam

== See also ==
- Cinnamon
- Cinnamomum
- Cinnamomum cassia
- Cinnamomum tamala
