= Cháo lòng =

Vietnamese rice porridge with pork offal

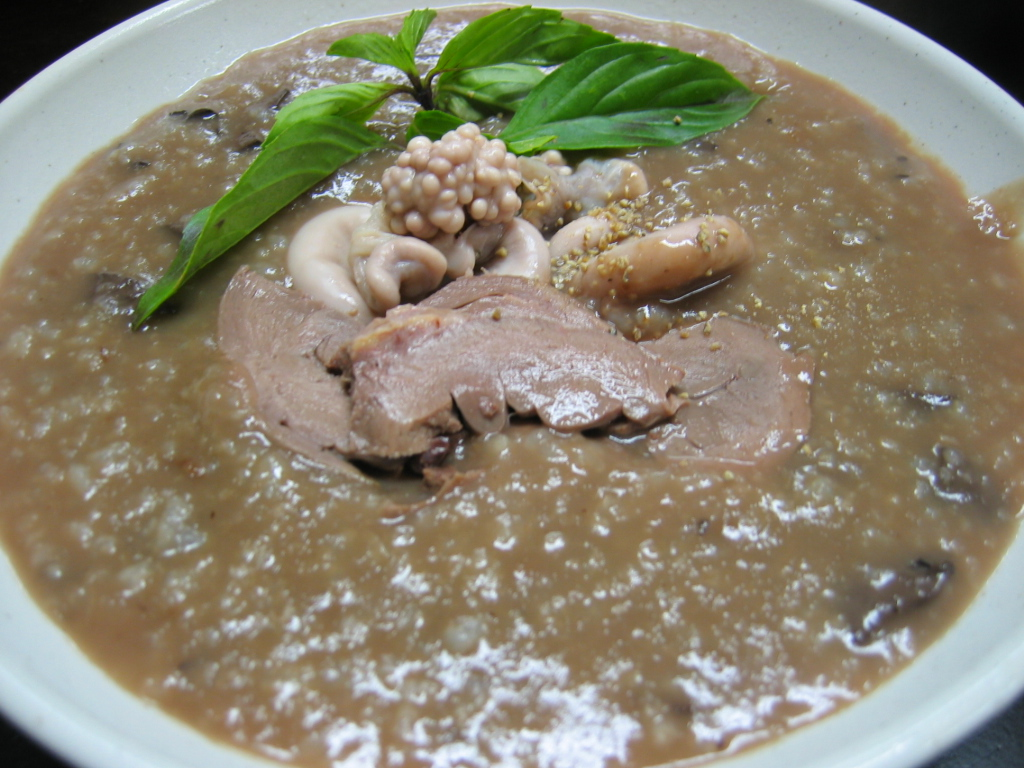
- Cháo lòng
- Type: Rice porridge
- Course: Breakfast, late-night meal
- Place of origin: Vietnam
- Region or state: Nationwide
- Serving temperature: Hot
- Main ingredients: Rice, pork offal, pork broth
- Variations: Regional preparations; served with dồi tiết

Cháo lòng is a traditional Vietnamese dish consisting of rice porridge (cháo) served with assorted pork offal (lòng). It is commonly eaten for breakfast or later in the day. It is widely available throughout Vietnam, particularly at street food stalls and casual eateries. It is considered nourishing and affordable.

== Description ==
Cháo lòng is prepared by simmering rice in pork-based broth until it reaches a smooth, porridge-like consistency. The dish is served with various boiled or lightly seasoned pork organs, which may include intestines, stomach, liver, heart, kidneys, and lungs. Pork uterus is often included as well.

The porridge itself is typically mildly seasoned, allowing diners to adjust flavor using condiments such as fish sauce, black pepper, chili, lime, scallions, and fried shallots. A common accompaniment is dồi tiết, a Vietnamese blood sausage made from pork blood, minced offal, and herbs.

== Ingredients ==
Common ingredients include:

- Rice (often broken or medium-grain rice)
- Pork bones for broth
- Pork offal (intestines, liver, heart, stomach)
- Pork blood sausage (dồi tiết)
- Ginger and shallots
- Fresh herbs such as scallions and cilantro
- Fish sauce, pepper, chili, and lime

Ingredient selection varies by region and household tradition.

== Preparation ==
Preparation generally involves thoroughly cleaning pork offal using salt, vinegar, or citrus to remove odors. The offal is parboiled and cooked separately to maintain texture, while rice is simmered slowly in pork broth for several hours. The cooked organs are sliced and served atop or alongside the porridge, which is finished with herbs and condiments before serving.

== Regional variations ==
Cháo lòng is consumed throughout Vietnam, with regional variations:

- In northern Vietnam, the porridge is thicker often eaten with fried dough.
- Central Vietnamese preparations may be bolder and heavily seasoned.
- Southern Vietnamese versions the porridge is thinner and lighter and eaten with additional herbs.

== See also ==
- Chao long
- Vietnamese cuisine
