= Trà My =

Trà My Xã Trà My
- Commune
- Location in Vietnam
- Coordinates: 15°20′22″N 108°13′19″E
- Country: Vietnam
- Province: Đà Nẵng

Area
  - Total: 7.86 sq mi (20.35 km^{2})

Population (2007)
  - Total: 7,628
  - Density: 970/sq mi (375/km^{2})
- Time zone: UTC+07:00

Trà My is a commune (xã) of Đà Nẵng, Vietnam.
