= List of endemic and threatened plants of India =

This is a list of plants from India that are considered rare, threatened, endangered, or extinct by the IUCN or the Botanical Survey of India. Some of the regions mentioned here may refer to old and outdated states or regional boundaries and may need to be interpreted with caution.

The BSI status symbols used are extinct (Ex), extinct/endangered (Ex/E), endangered (E), vulnerable (V), rare (R) and indeterminate (I). Two letter state identification codes are used (see ISO 3166-2:IN) and WG stands for Western Ghats. The IUCN status is indicated where available.

== Charophyta ==
Species	Family	BSI status	IUCN status	Region	Notes
Chara nuda	Characeae		Data deficient		
Chara setosa	Characeae		Data deficient		
Nitella annamalaiensis	Characeae		Data deficient		

== Jungermanniopsida ==
Species	Family	BSI status	IUCN status	Region	Notes
Diplocolea sikkimensis	Solenostomataceae		Endangered	Eastern Himalayas	
Sewardiella tuberifera	Petalophyllaceae		Vulnerable		

== Marchantiopsida ==
Species	Family	BSI status	IUCN status	Region	Notes
Aitchisoniella himalayensis	Exormothecaceae		Endangered		
Sauteria spongiosa	Cleveaceae		Lower risk/least concern		
Stephensoniella brevipedunculata	Exormothecaceae		Endangered		

== Bryopsida ==
Species	Family	BSI status	IUCN status	Region	Notes
Mitrobryum koelzii	Dicranaceae		Endangered	UP	
Pinnatella limbata	Neckeraceae		Critically endangered	KA	

== Takakiopsida ==
Species	Family	BSI status	IUCN status	Region	Notes
Takakia ceratophylla	Takakiaceae		Vulnerable		

== Lycopodiopsida ==
Species	Family	BSI status	IUCN status	Region	Notes
Isoetes bilaspurensis	Isoetaceae	R		Madhya Pradesh	
Isoetes dixitii	Isoetaceae	Ex		Panchghani	
Isoetes sampathkumarnii	Isoetaceae	Ex		KA	
Isoetes divyadarshanii	Isoetaceae		Data deficient		
Isoetes panchganiensis	Isoetaceae		Endangered		
Isoetes udupiensis	Isoetaceae		Data deficient		
Selaginella adunca	Selaginellaceae	E		HP, UP	
Selaginella cataractarum	Selaginellaceae	E		KL, TN	

== Polypodiopsida ==
Species	Family	BSI status	IUCN status	Region	Notes
Coniogramme indica	Adiantaceae	R		MN, ML	
Cyathea albosetacea	Cyatheaceae	V		Nicobar	
Cyathea nilgirensis	Cyatheaceae	E		KL, TN	
Lindsaea malabarica	Lindsaeaceae	R	Near threatened		
Lindsaea tenera	Lindsaeaceae	R			
Dryopteris gamblei	Dryopteridaceae	V		ML, UP, WB	
Lastreopsis wattii	Dryopteridaceae	Ex		MN	
Polystichum wattii	Dryopteridaceae	Ex/E		MN	
Dicranopteris linearis var. sebastiana	Gleicheniaceae	V		TN	
Elaphoglossum stigmatolepis	Dryopteridaceae	V		Nilgiris, Palnis	
Christensenia assamica	Marattiaceae	V		AR, AS	
Dendroglossa minutula	Polypodiaceae	E		Khasi Hills	
Drynaria meeboldii	Polypodiaceae	V		MN	
Holcosorus bisulcatus	Polypodiaceae	E		AR	
Oreogrammitis austroindica	Polypodiaceae		Data deficient		
Christella clarkei	Thelypteridaceae	V		Sikkim	
Christella kaumaunica	Thelypteridaceae	V		UP	
Coryphopteris didymochlaenoides	Thelypteridaceae	R		ML	
Cyclogramma squamaestipes	Thelypteridaceae	R		Sikkim	
Metathelypteris decipiens	Thelypteridaceae	R		ML, Darjeeling	
Oreopteris elwesii	Thelypteridaceae	R		Sikkim	
Pseudocyclosorus gamblei	Thelypteridaceae	E		Nilgiris, Palnis	
Pseudocyclosorus griseus	Thelypteridaceae	E		TN	
Stenogramma himalaica	Thelypteridaceae	V		NW Himalayas	
Athyrium atratum	Athyriaceae	E		MN	
Athyrium duthei	Athyriaceae	R		Sikkim	
Woodsia andersonii	Woodsiaceae	Ex/E		Kumaon	

== Cycadopsida ==
Species	Family	BSI status	IUCN status	Region	Notes
Cycas beddomei	Cycadaceae	E	Endangered	AP	
Cycas annaikalensis	Cycadaceae		Critically endangered	KL	
Cycas circinalis	Cycadaceae		Endangered	KL	
Cycas pectinata	Cycadaceae		Vulnerable		
Cycas sphaerica	Cycadaceae		Data deficient		
Cycas zeylanica	Cycadaceae		Vulnerable		

== Pinopsida ==
Species	Family	BSI status	IUCN status	Region	Notes
Cephalotaxus mannii	Taxaceae	V	Vulnerable	Mishmi, Khasi, Jaintia, Naga Hills	
Cephalotaxus oliveri	Taxaceae	V			
Abies spectabilis	Pinaceae		Near threatened		
Cupressus cashmeriana	Cupressaceae		Near threatened		
Juniperus recurva var. coxii	Cupressaceae		Near threatened		
Larix griffithii var. speciosa	Pinaceae		Near threatened		
Picea brachytyla	Pinaceae		Vulnerable		
Taxus contorta	Taxaceae		Endangered	JK, LA	
Taxus wallichiana	Taxaceae		Endangered	JK, LA, UK	
Picea brachytyla var. complanata	Pinaceae	V	Vulnerable	AR	
Picea spinulosa	Pinaceae	R	Least concern	Sikkim	
Pinus gerardiana	Pinaceae	R	Near threatened	JK	
Amentotaxus assamica	Taxaceae	V	Endangered	AR	

== Gnetopsida ==
Species	Family	BSI status	IUCN status	Region	Notes
Ephedra khurikensis	Ephedraceae		Data deficient		
Gnetum contractum	Gnetaceae		Vulnerable		

== Magnoliopsida ==
Species	Family	BSI status	IUCN status	Region	Notes
Andrographis beddomei	Acanthaceae	I		AP	
Andrographis stellata	Acanthaceae	I		Nilgiris	
Barleria gibsonioides	Acanthaceae	R		Panchgani	
Barleria prionitis var. diacantha	Acanthaceae	I		RJ	
Dicliptera abuensis	Acanthaceae	E		RJ (Mt. Abu)	
Dicliptera beddomei	Acanthaceae	I		Nallamalai	
Dicliptera ghatica	Acanthaceae	I		Maharashtra	
Didyplosandra andersonii	Acanthaceae	I		TN	
Hygrophila pinnatifida	Acanthaceae	I	Least concern	KA	
Hypoestes andamanensis	Acanthaceae	I		Andamans	
Hypoestes lanata	Acanthaceae	R		WG	
Justicia beddomei	Acanthaceae	E		TN	Only from the Gingee forests, Naraikadu R.F. and Panagudi forests in Tamil Nadu and ex-situ cultivation.
Justicia salsoloides	Acanthaceae	I		KA	
Lepidagathis barberi	Acanthaceae	R		S. India	
Lepidagathis diffusa	Acanthaceae	I		India	
Mackenziea caudata	Acanthaceae	R		Coorg, Wayanad, KA	
Neuracanthus neesianus	Acanthaceae	Ex/E		TN	
Nilgirianthus campanulatus	Acanthaceae	I		Coorg, KA	
Nilgirianthus papillosus	Acanthaceae	I		Nilgiris	
Phlebophyllum canaricum	Acanthaceae	I		KA	
Phlebophyllum jeyporensis	Acanthaceae	E		AP, Bastar	
Phlebophyllum lanatum	Acanthaceae	I		Nilgiris	
Rungia linifolia	Acanthaceae	I		KA	
Santapaua madurensis	Acanthaceae	E		TN	
Stenosiphonium setosum	Acanthaceae	I		Mysore	
Strobilanthes andamanensis	Acanthaceae	I		Andamans	
Strobilanthes hallbergii	Acanthaceae	I		Mt. Abu, RJ	
Strobilanthes urceolaris	Acanthaceae	I		Nilgiris, Palanis	
Thunbergia bicolor	Acanthaceae	I		Nilgiris	
Acer caesium	Aceraceae	V	Least concern	W.Himalaya	
Acer molle	Aceraceae	I		W.Himalaya	
Acer oblongum var. membranaceum	Aceraceae	E	Critically endangered	W.Himalaya	
Acer oblongum var. microcarpum	Aceraceae	E	Vulnerable	E.Himalaya	
Saurauia griffithii	Actinidiaceae	I		AR, SK	
Achyranthes coynei	Amaranthaceae	R		Khandala	
Aerva wightii	Amaranthaceae	I		Tirunelveli	
Buchanania barberi	Anacardiaceae	E	Critically endangered	KL	
Buchanania lanceolata	Anacardiaceae	I	Vulnerable	KL	
Buchanania platyneura	Anacardiaceae	I	Vulnerable	Andamans, Nicobars	
Mangifera andamanica	Anacardiaceae	V	Near threatened	Andamans	
Mangifera khasiana	Anacardiaceae	I		Khasi hills	
Nothopegia aureo-fulva	Anacardiaceae	E	Critically endangered	Tirunelveli Hills	
Nothopegia colebrookiana	Anacardiaceae	I		TN	
Semecarpus auriculata	Anacardiaceae	I	Lower risk/near threatened	WG, Muthukuzhivayal	
Semecarpus kathalekanensis	Anacardiaceae		Critically endangered	WG, Goa, KA	
Artabotrys nicobaricus	Annonaceae	R		Nicobars	
Desmos viridiflorus	Annonaceae	E		KL, TN	
Goniothalamus rhynchantherus	Annonaceae	R	Endangered	KL, TN	
Goniothalamus simonsii	Annonaceae	I	Endangered	ML	
Goniothalamus wynaadensis	Annonaceae	I	Lower risk/near threatened	TN	
Miliusa nilagirica	Annonaceae	V	Vulnerable	TN	
Miliusa tectona	Annonaceae	I		Andamans	
Mitrephora andamanica	Annonaceae	R		Andamans	
Orophea salicifolia	Annonaceae	I		Andamans	
Orophea thomsoni	Annonaceae	I	Endangered	TN	
Orophea torulosa	Annonaceae	I		Andamans	
Orophea uniflora	Annonaceae	I	Vulnerable	WG, KA, KL, TN	
Phaeanthus malabaricus	Annonaceae	V	Lower risk/near threatened	KL	
Polyalthia rufescens	Annonaceae	R	Endangered	KL, TN	
Popowia beddomeana	Annonaceae	R	Endangered	KL, TN	
Popowia parvifolia	Annonaceae	I		Nicobars	
Pseuduvaria prainii	Annonaceae	R	Vulnerable	Andamans, Nicobars	
Sageraea grandiflora	Annonaceae	Ex/E	Endangered	KL	
Sageraea laurifolia	Annonaceae	I	Lower risk/near threatened	WG, KL, KA, TN	
Sageraea listeri var. andamanica	Annonaceae	I		Andamans	
Trivalvaria kanjilalii	Annonaceae	E		ML	
Unona longiflora	Annonaceae	I		ML	
Uvaria eucincta	Annonaceae	E		OR	
Uvaria hamiltonii var. kurzii	Annonaceae	I		Andamans	
Uvaria lurida	Annonaceae	I		ML	
Uvaria nicobarica	Annonaceae	R		Nicobars	
Rauvolfia beddomei	Apocynaceae	R		KL, TN	
Wrightia dolichocarpa	Apocynaceae	I		Goa	
Ilex embeloides	Aquifoliaceae	I		Khasi Hills	
Ilex gardneriana	Aquifoliaceae	Ex/E	Extinct	Sispara, Nilgiri	
Ilex khasiana	Aquifoliaceae	E	Critically endangered	ML (Khasi Hills)	
Ilex venulosa	Aquifoliaceae	I	Endangered	AR (Khasi hills)	
Merrilliopanax cordifolia	Araliaceae	I		AR (Subansiri)	
Heptapleurum bourdillonii	Araliaceae	I	Endangered	KL (Travancore Hills)	
Apama barberi	Aristolochiaceae	I		TN	
Thottea barberi	Aristolochiaceae	V		TN (Tirunelveli)	
Brachystelma bournea	Apocynaceae	I		TN (Madurai)	
Brachystelma elenaduense	Apocynaceae			TN, KA	
Caralluma diffusa	Apocynaceae	I		KL, TN, OR, AP	
Ceropegia angustifolia	Apocynaceae	V		ML	
Ceropegia attenuata	Apocynaceae	R		KA, MH	
Ceropegia barnesii	Apocynaceae	E		KA, TN	
Ceropegia beddomei	Apocynaceae	R		KL (Idukki, Ponmudi)	
Ceropegia bulbosa	Apocynaceae	V		Punjab, UP	
Ceropegia decaisneana var. brevicollis	Apocynaceae	I		KL, TN	
Ceropegia evansii	Apocynaceae	E		MH (Khandala, Pune)	
Ceropegia fantastica	Apocynaceae	E		Goa, Daman & Diu, KA (Sulgeri, North Kanara)	
Ceropegia fimbriifera	Apocynaceae	R		KA, KL, TN	
Ceropegia hookeri var. hookeri	Apocynaceae	E		Sikkim	
Ceropegia huberi	Apocynaceae	E		MH (Varadha Ghat; Susale Island; Amba Ghat)	
Ceropegia intermedia var. wightii	Apocynaceae	I		TN	
Ceropegia jainii	Apocynaceae	R		MH	
Ceropegia lawii	Apocynaceae	E		MH (Konkan, Harishchandragad)	
Ceropegia maccannii	Apocynaceae	R		MH	
Ceropegia maculata	Apocynaceae	E		KL, TN (Tirunelveli)	
Ceropegia mahabalei	Apocynaceae	E		MH	
Ceropegia media	Apocynaceae	R		MH	
Ceropegia noorjahaniae	Apocynaceae	R		MH (Panchgani Ghat, Satara District)	
Ceropegia oculata var. occulta	Apocynaceae	R		MH (Pune; Ratgiri; Raigad)	
Ceropegia odorata	Apocynaceae	E	Critically endangered	GJ (Pavagadh Hill), MH (Melghat), RJ (Mt Abu)	
Ceropegia omissa	Apocynaceae	E		TN (Sengalteri, Tirunelvelly)	
Ceropegia panchganiensis	Apocynaceae	E		MH (Panchgani; Lingmala)	
Ceropegia pusilla	Apocynaceae	R		KA (Mysore District), TN	
Ceropegia rollae	Apocynaceae	R		MH	
Ceropegia sahyadrica	Apocynaceae	E		MH (Pune & Sindhudurg District)	
Ceropegia santapaui	Apocynaceae	R		MH (Pune; Satara; Ratgiri)	
Ceropegia spiralis	Apocynaceae	R		AP, KA, KL, TN	
Ceropegia vincifolia	Apocynaceae	E		MH (Thane; Pune; Satara)	
Dischidia rafflesiana	Apocynaceae	I		AS	
Frerea indica	Apocynaceae	E		MH (Junnar & Purandhar hills)	
Gymnema elegans	Apocynaceae	I		TN	
Gymnema khandalense	Apocynaceae	R	Endangered	MH	
Hoya lobii	Apocynaceae	I		ML	
Marsdenia raziana	Apocynaceae	R		KA (Chikmagalur dist.)	
Oianthus beddomei	Apocynaceae	I		KA, KL (Wayanad)	
Oianthus deccanensis	Apocynaceae	Ex/E		MH	
Oianthus disciflorus	Apocynaceae	I		AP (Kurnool), KA (North Kanara)	
Seshagiria sahyadrica	Apocynaceae	R		MH	
Streptocaulon kleinii	Apocynaceae	I		(Deccan Peninsula)	
Toxocarpus beddomei	Apocynaceae	R		KL (Palghat Hills), TN	
Toxocarpus longistigma	Apocynaceae	E		AP	
Toxocarpus palghatensis	Apocynaceae	V		KL (Palghat Hills)	
Utleria salicifolia	Apocynaceae	E	Critically endangered	KL, TN	
Impatiens acaulis	Balsaminaceae	I		KA (Konkan), KL, TN (Nilgiri)	
Impatiens aliciae	Balsaminaceae	I		KL (Travancore )	
Impatiens anaimudica	Balsaminaceae	Ex/E		KL (Aimudi)	
Impatiens barberi	Balsaminaceae	I		KA (Kadumane)	
Impatiens cochinica	Balsaminaceae	I		KL (Kavalay, Cochin)	
Impatiens coelotropis	Balsaminaceae	I		KL (Aimudi)	
Impatiens concinna	Balsaminaceae	I		KL (Malabar)	
Impatiens crenata	Balsaminaceae	I		TN	
Impatiens dassysperma	Balsaminaceae	I		KA (Mysore hills), TN (Courtallum, Tirunelveli)	
Impatiens debilis	Balsaminaceae	I		TN (Nilgiri Hills)	
Impatiens dendricola	Balsaminaceae	I		KA (Thandiandamol, Coorg)	
Impatiens harrissii	Balsaminaceae	I		W. Himalaya)	
Impatiens johnii	Balsaminaceae	Ex/E		KL (Kalaar valley, Idukki)	
Impatiens laticornis	Balsaminaceae	I		TN (Kundha, Nilgiri hills)	
Impatiens lawii	Balsaminaceae	I		KL	
Impatiens lawsonii	Balsaminaceae	I		TN (Nilgiri Hills)	
Impatiens leptura	Balsaminaceae	I		KL (Travancore)	
Impatiens lucida	Balsaminaceae	I		KA (South Kanara), KL (Travancore)	
Impatiens macrocarpa	Balsaminaceae	Ex/E		KL (Travancore Hills)	
Impatiens meeboldii	Balsaminaceae	I		JK	
Impatiens munnarensis	Balsaminaceae	E		KL (Munr, Idikki)	
Impatiens munronii	Balsaminaceae	I		TN (Sispara, Nilgiri)	
Impatiens nataliae	Balsaminaceae	I		KA (Kumsi, Shimoga)	
Impatiens neo-barnessi	Balsaminaceae	E		TN (Kundha, Nilgiri hills)	
Impatiens nilagirica	Balsaminaceae	E		TN (Kundha, Nilgiri hills)	
Impatiens pahalgamensis	Balsaminaceae	I		JK	
Impatiens pallidiflora	Balsaminaceae	I		KL (Devicolam, Idukki)	
Impatiens pandata	Balsaminaceae	R		KL	
Impatiens platyadena	Balsaminaceae	I		KL (Aimudi)	
Impatiens rivulicola	Balsaminaceae	I		KL (Puraiar Valley, Travancore)	
Impatiens rufescens	Balsaminaceae	I		TN	
Impatiens setosa	Balsaminaceae	I		TN	
Impatiens stocksii	Balsaminaceae	I		KA	
Impatiens talbotii	Balsaminaceae	R		KA	
Impatiens verucunda	Balsaminaceae	I		KL, TN	
Impatiens viridiflora	Balsaminaceae	I		TN	
Impatiens wightiana	Balsaminaceae	I		TN	
Begonia aborensis	Begoniaceae	R		AR	
Begonia aliciae	Begoniaceae	E		KL (Travancore Hills)	
Begonia anamalayana	Begoniaceae	E		WG	
Begonia brevicaulis	Begoniaceae	Ex/E		ML	
Begonia burkillii	Begoniaceae	R		AR	
Begonia canarana	Begoniaceae	E		KL, KA (South Kanara)	
Begonia cordifolia	Begoniaceae	R		KL (Malabar), TN	
Begonia lushaiensis	Begoniaceae	R		MZ	
Begonia phrixophylla	Begoniaceae	R		MH	
Begonia rubro-venia var. meisneri	Begoniaceae	R		ML	
Begonia satrapis	Begoniaceae	R		Sikkim	
Begonia scintillans	Begoniaceae	I		AR	
Begonia scutata	Begoniaceae	R		Sikkim, West Bengal	
Begonia subpeltata	Begoniaceae	R		(South Deccan Peninsula and WG)	
Begonia tessaricarpa	Begoniaceae	I		AS	
Begonia trichocarpa	Begoniaceae	V		(WG and southwest)	
Begonia wattii	Begoniaceae	E		NL	
Begonia wengeri	Begoniaceae	I		MZ	
Berberis affinis	Berberidaceae	R		Kumaon	
Berberis apiculata	Berberidaceae	R		Himachal Pradesh (Simla)	
Berberis huegeliana	Berberidaceae	I		JK (Kashmir)	
Berberis kashmiriana	Berberidaceae	R		JK (Mantr valley, nr Desu)	
Berberis lambertii	Berberidaceae	V		Uttarakhand	
Berberis nilghiriensis	Berberidaceae	V	Critically endangered	TN (Nilgiri Hills)	
Berberis orthobotrys var. sinthanensis	Berberidaceae	I		JK (only Kashmir)	
Berberis osmastonii	Berberidaceae	R		Garhwal	
Berberis petiolaris var. garhwalana	Berberidaceae	I		Garhwal; Kumaun	
Berberis pseudoumbellata	Berberidaceae	I		Himachal Pradesh (Chamba, Simla), JK, Garhwal	
Berberis royleana	Berberidaceae	I		JK (only Kashmir)	
Mahonia jaunsarensis	Berberidaceae	I		Chakrata	
Bombax insigne var. polystemon	Bombacaceae	I	Critically endangered	Nicobars	
Arnebia benthamii	Boraginaceae	E		JK	
Cordia octandra	Boraginaceae	I		KL (Travancore Hills)	
Ehretia wightiana	Boraginaceae	I		TN (Tirunelveli District)	
Heliotropium bacciferum var. suberosum	Boraginaceae	I		GJ (Kutch, north-east Rajasthan)	
Paracaryum coelastinum	Boraginaceae	I		KA	
Paracaryum malabaricum	Boraginaceae	I		KA	
Boswellia ovalifoliolata	Burseraceae	I	Vulnerable	AP	
Mesua manii	Calophyllaceae	I	Critically endangered	Andaman Is. (South)	
Poeciloneuron pauciflorum	Calophyllaceae	I		KL, TN	
Campanula alphonsii	Campanulaceae	R		(Nilgiris and Palani Hills and WG)	
Campanula wattiana	Campanulaceae	R		Himachal Pradesh, Uttar Pradesh	
Cephalostigma flexuosum	Campanulaceae	I		KA, TN	
Codonopsis affinis	Campanulaceae	R		Sikkim (Darjeeling)	
Cyananthus integra	Campanulaceae	R		Kumoan, Tehri Garhwal Himalayas.	
Capparis cinerea	Capparaceae	I		MN	
Capparis diversifolia	Capparaceae	V		KL, TN	
Capparis fusiferaDunn	Capparaceae	R		KL (Travancore), TN	
Capparis pachyphylla	Capparaceae	V	Endangered	AR	
Capparis rheedii	Capparaceae	R		Goa, KA (North Kanara; South Kanara), KL, TN	
Capparis shevaroyensis	Capparaceae	V		TN	
Cleome burmanni	Capparaceae	I		KL, TN	
Cleome gynandra var. nana	Capparaceae	I		RJ (Jaiselmer, Jodhpur)	
Arenaria curvifolia	Caryophyllaceae	E		Uttar Pradesh (Garhwal Himalaya)	
Arenaria ferruginea	Caryophyllaceae	E		Uttar Pradesh (Kali/Dhauki Valley, Kumaon)	
Arenaria neelgerrensis	Caryophyllaceae	I		JK, TN	
Arenaria thangoensis	Caryophyllaceae	V		Sikkim (Thango; Chugya)	
Cerastium thomsoni	Caryophyllaceae	I		W. Himalaya	
Dianthus minimus	Caryophyllaceae	I		JK	
Polycarpaea diffusa	Caryophyllaceae	V		TN	
Silene khasiana	Caryophyllaceae	I		ML	
Silene kumaonensis	Caryophyllaceae	R		Uttar Pradesh (Garhwal Himalaya)	
Silene kunawarensis	Caryophyllaceae	R		Himachal Pradesh, JK	
Silene vagans	Caryophyllaceae	I		NL	
Stellaria depressa	Caryophyllaceae	I		JK	
Euonymus angulatus	Celastraceae	E	Vulnerable	KA, KL, TN	
Euonymus bullatus	Celastraceae	I		AS, ML	
Euonymus serratifolius	Celastraceae	Ex/E	Endangered	TN	
Hippocratea andamanica	Celastraceae	R		Andamans	
Hippocratea nicobarica	Celastraceae	I		Nicobars	
Loeseneriella bourdillonii	Celastraceae	I		KL	
Microtropis deniflora	Celastraceae	I		TN	
Salacia beddomei	Celastraceae	R		TN	
Salacia jenkinsii	Celastraceae	E		AS	
Salacia macrosperma	Celastraceae	I		KA (Konkan), TN (Wayanad, Nilgiri)	
Salacia malabarica	Celastraceae	Ex/E		KA (Coorg), KL	
Atuna travancorica	Chrysobalanaceae	I	Endangered	TN, KL	
Parinari indicum	Chrysobalanaceae	I		TN	
Parinari travancoricum	Chrysobalanaceae	I		TN, KL	
Garcinia cadelliana	Clusiaceae	I	Critically endangered	Andaman Is.	
Garcinia calycina	Clusiaceae	I		Nicobar Is.	
Garcinia imbertii	Clusiaceae	I	Endangered	KL	
Garcinia indica	Clusiaceae	I	Vulnerable	KA, KL	
Garcinia kingii	Clusiaceae	I	Endangered	Andaman Is.	
Garcinia rubro-echinata	Clusiaceae	I	Vulnerable	KL, TN	
Garcinia talbotii	Clusiaceae	I		KA, TN	
Anogeissus sericea var. nummularia	Combretaceae	I		GJ, Punjab, RJ	
Ageratum houstonianum	Asteraceae	I		TN (Nilgiri & Palani Hills)	
Anaphalis barnesii	Asteraceae	E		KL (High Range, Idukki)	
Anaphalis beddomei	Asteraceae	I	Vulnerable	TN (Palani Hills)	
Artemisia dolichocephala	Asteraceae	I		JK	
Blumea sericea, syn. Nanothamnus sericeus	Asteraceae	R		KA, MH	
Catamixis baccharoides	Asteraceae	V		(Siwalik & Tehri, Garhwal)	
Centratherum courtallense	Asteraceae	I		KL, TN	
Centratherum mayurii	Asteraceae	I		KA (Kemmangundi)	
Centratherum ritchiei	Asteraceae	I		KA (Kanara & Konkan)	
Centratherum tenue	Asteraceae	I		KA (Konkan)	
Chondrilla setulosa	Asteraceae	R		JK	
Cousinia falconeri	Asteraceae	I		JK	
Cremanthodium arnicoides	Asteraceae	E		JK (Apharwat)	
Cyathocline lutea	Asteraceae	R	Least concern	KA, MH	
Helichrysum cutchicum	Asteraceae	R	Vulnerable	GJ	
Helichrysum perlanigerum	Asteraceae	R		TN	
Helichrysum wightii	Asteraceae	I		TN	
Inula kalapani	Asteraceae	R		ML (Khasi hills)	
Inula racemosa	Asteraceae	V		JK	
Lactuca benthamii	Asteraceae	E		JK (Kashmir)	
Lactuca cooperi	Asteraceae	E		Sikkim	
Lactuca filicina	Asteraceae	E		Uttar Pradesh (Kali Valley, Kumaon)	
Lactuca undulata	Asteraceae	E		JK (Kashmir)	
Myriactis wightii var. bellidioides	Asteraceae	I		TN (Sispara, Nilgiri Hills)	
Notonia shevaroyensis	Asteraceae	I	Vulnerable	TN (Shevaroy Hills, Salem Dist)	
Pulicaria rajputanae	Asteraceae	I		RJ	
Saussurea atkinsoni	Asteraceae	I		HP, JK	
Saussurea bracteata	Asteraceae	R		HP, JK, Uttarakhand	
Saussurea clarkei	Asteraceae	R		JK (Kashmir Himalaya)	
Saussurea costus	Asteraceae	E	Critically endangered	HP, JK	
Saussurea foliosa	Asteraceae	I		Garhwal; Kumaun	
Saussurea roylei	Asteraceae	I		HP, JK, UK	
Senecio dalzellii	Asteraceae	I		KA	
Senecio kundaicus	Asteraceae	E		TN	
Senecio mayurii	Asteraceae	R		KA	
Senecio mishmi	Asteraceae	V		ML	
Senecio rhabdos	Asteraceae	R		MN, NL	
Synotis simonsii	Asteraceae	I		AS	
Vernonia andamanica	Asteraceae	R		Andaman Is. (Saddle Peak, N. Andamans)	
Vernonia beddomei	Asteraceae	I		KL	
Vernonia bourdillonii	Asteraceae	I		KL (Travancore Hills; Chemungi), TN (Tirunelveli Dist.)	
Vernonia fysoni	Asteraceae	I		TN (Palani Hills)	
Vernonia heynii	Asteraceae	I		KL (Travancore Hills)	
Vernonia membranacea	Asteraceae	I		KL (Trivandrum District), TN (Sispara, Nilgiri Hills)	
Vernonia multibracteata	Asteraceae	E		KL (Peermade, Idukki District)	
Vernonia peninsularis	Asteraceae	I		TN	
Vernonia pulneyensis	Asteraceae	E		TN (Pulney Hills, W. Ghats)	
Vernonia ramasamii	Asteraceae	I		KL (Trivandrum Dist.), TN	
Vernonia recurva	Asteraceae	Ex/E		TN	
Vernonia saligna var. nilghirensis	Asteraceae	I		KL (Wayanad), TN (Nilgiris)	
Vernonia salvifolia	Asteraceae	I		KL (Travancore), TN (Courtallum Hills)	
Youngia nilagiriensis	Asteraceae	E		TN (Sispara, Nilgiri Hills)	
Connarus nicobaricus	Connaraceae	I		Gt. Nicobar Is.	
Ellipanthus calophyllus	Connaraceae	I		Andaman Is.	
Ellipanthus neglectus	Connaraceae	I		KL (Travancore Hills), TN (Tirunelveli Hills)	
Convolvulus auricomus var. ferruginosus	Convolvulaceae	I		RJ	
Convolvulus blatteri	Convolvulaceae	I		RJ (Jaisalmer)	
Convolvulus flavus	Convolvulaceae	I		TN	
Ipomoea cairica var. semine-glabra	Convolvulaceae	I		RJ	
Ipomoea clarkei	Convolvulaceae	R		Uttar Pradesh (WG in Thane, Pune and sik Districts)	
Neuropeltis racemosa	Convolvulaceae	I		KL (Tambracheri Ghat, Malabar)	
Kalanchoe olivacea	Crassulaceae	R		TN	
Kalanchoe roseus	Crassulaceae	E		MN, NL	
Sedum duthie	Crassulaceae	I		Kumaun	
Arabis stewartiana	Cruciferae	I		(W. Himalaya)	
Arabis tenuirostris	Cruciferae	I		JK	
Draba dasyastra	Cruciferae	I		JK	
Erophila tenerrima	Cruciferae	I		JK	
Erysimum thomsonii	Cruciferae	R		HP	
Farsetia macrantha	Cruciferae	I		RJ (Mataji's Temple, Barmer)	
Megacarpaea bifida	Cruciferae	E		JK (Apharwat)	
Corallocarpus gracillipes	Cucurbitaceae	I		TN (Pondicherry, Carnatic)	
Luffa umbellata	Cucurbitaceae	I		KL (Travancore coast)	
Melothria amplexicaulis	Cucurbitaceae	I		TN	
Momordica subangulata	Cucurbitaceae	I		KA (South Kanara), KL (Wayanad)	
Trichosanthes lepiniana	Cucurbitaceae	I		TN (Nilgiri Hills)	
Trichosanthes perrottetiana	Cucurbitaceae	I		TN (Pondicherry, Carnatic)	
Trichosanthes villosula	Cucurbitaceae	I		Nilgiris	
Dichapetalum gelonoides subsp. andamanicum	Dichapetalaceae	I		South Andamans	
Dipterocarpus bourdilloni	Dipterocarpaceae	R	Critically endangered	KL	
Dipterocarpus kerrii	Dipterocarpaceae	V	Endangered	Andaman Is. (Goplakabang, Mt Harriet)	
Hopea erosa	Dipterocarpaceae	Ex/E	Critically endangered	TN	
Hopea jacobi	Dipterocarpaceae	R	Critically endangered	KA (Coorg)	
Hopea ponga	Dipterocarpaceae	V		KA (N. Kanara), KL, TN	
Shorea tumbugaia	Dipterocarpaceae	E	Endangered	AP, TN	
Vateria macrocarpa	Dipterocarpaceae	R	Critically endangered	KL	
Elaeagnus conferta subsp. dendroidea	Elaeagnaceae	E		Khasi Hills	
Elaeocarpus blascoi	Elaeocarpaceae	R	Endangered	TN	
Elaeocarpus gaussenii	Elaeocarpaceae	R	Critically endangered	(WG)	
Elaeocarpus munroi	Elaeocarpaceae	R	Lower risk/near threatened	KA, MH, TN	
Elaeocarpus recurvatus	Elaeocarpaceae	R	Vulnerable	TN	
Elaeocarpus venustus	Elaeocarpaceae	V	Vulnerable	KL, TN	
Agapetes nuttallii	Ericaceae	I		AR	
Rhododendron concinnoides	Ericaceae	E		AR	
Rhododendron dalhousiae var. rhabdotum	Ericaceae	I	Vulnerable	AR	
Rhododendron elliottii	Ericaceae	I		MN, NL	
Rhododendron formosum	Ericaceae	V		AR, MN, ML, NL	
Rhododendron johnstoneanum	Ericaceae	I		MN, MZ	
Rhododendron macabeanum	Ericaceae	R		MN, NL	
Rhododendron santapaui	Ericaceae	E		AR	
Rhododendron subansiriense	Ericaceae	E	Vulnerable	AR	
Rhododendron wattii	Ericaceae	E	Vulnerable	MN	
Antidesma andamanicum	Phyllanthaceae	I		Andaman Is. (South)	
Blachia reflexa	Phyllanthaceae	I		KA (Coorg), KL, TN (Nilgiris)	
Chamaesyce linearifolia	Phyllanthaceae	I		AP (Kurnool)	
Cnesmone jvanica var. glabriuscula	Phyllanthaceae	I		Andaman Is. (South)	
Croton scabiosus	Phyllanthaceae	I		AP	
Cyclostemon malabaricus	Phyllanthaceae	I		KL (Travancore Hills), TN	
Dalechampia stenoloba	Phyllanthaceae	R		KA (Sukalhatti, Chikmagalur)	
Drypetes andamanica	Phyllanthaceae	R	Endangered	Andaman Is. (South)	
Drypetes leiocarpa	Phyllanthaceae	I		Andaman Is. (south)	
Euphorbia katrajensis	Phyllanthaceae	R		MH	
Euphorbia panchganiensis	Phyllanthaceae	R		MH	
Excoecaria rectinervis	Phyllanthaceae	I		Nicobar Is. (katchal Is.)	
Fahrenheitia integrifolia	Phyllanthaceae	I		KL, TN	
Glochidion andamanicum	Phyllanthaceae	I		Andaman Is. (South)	
Glochidion bourdillonii	Phyllanthaceae	I	Vulnerable	KL (Travancore Hills)	
Glochidion pauciflorum	Phyllanthaceae	I	Endangered	TN	
Koilodepas calycinum	Phyllanthaceae	I	Endangered	TN	
Lasiococca comberi	Phyllanthaceae	I		AP	
Macaranga flexuosa	Phyllanthaceae	I		TN	
Meineckia longipes	Phyllanthaceae	I		KL (Quilon, Malabar), TN	
Micrococca wightii var. hirsutum	Phyllanthaceae	I		TN	
Phyllanthus narayanaswamii	Phyllanthaceae	E		AP (east Ghats)	
Phyllanthus talbotii	Phyllanthaceae	R		KA	
Pseudoglochidion anamalayanum	Phyllanthaceae	I	Critically endangered	TN	
Psilostachys sericea	Phyllanthaceae	I		Nellore, GJ, KL	
Reidia beddomei	Phyllanthaceae	I		KL, TN	
Reidia gageana	Phyllanthaceae	I		KL (Travancore Hills), TN (Tirunelveli Hills)	
Reidia megacarpa	Phyllanthaceae	I		TN (Devala, south east Wayanad)	
Reidia stipulacea	Phyllanthaceae	I		TN	
Trigonostemon chatterjii	Phyllanthaceae	I		ML (Khasi hills)	
Acacia campbellii	Fabaceae	R	Vulnerable	AP	
Acacia hohenackeri	Fabaceae	I		TN	
Acacia wightii	Fabaceae	I		KL (Travancore), TN	
Vachellia bolei	Fabaceae			TN, Pondicherry	Extinct
Albizia thompsonii	Fabaceae	R	Near threatened	AP, OR, TN	
Alysicarpus beddomei	Fabaceae	I		TN (Nilgiri Hills)	
Alysicarpus meeboldii	Fabaceae	I		JK	
Alysicarpus monilifer var. venosus	Fabaceae	I		RJ, Ladakh	
Amphicarpaea edgeworthii	Fabaceae	I		W. Himalaya	
Amphicarpaea flemingii	Fabaceae	I		Punjab	
Astragalus anomalus	Fabaceae	I		Ladakh	
Astragalus bakerii	Fabaceae	I		JK	
Cajanus sericus	Fabaceae	I		Vizag, KA	
Crotalaria bidiei	Fabaceae	I		TN (Wayanad, Nilgiri Hills)	
Crotalaria bourneae	Fabaceae	I		TN	
Crotalaria clarkei	Fabaceae	I		TN	
Crotalaria clavata	Fabaceae	E		TN	
Crotalaria conferta	Fabaceae	I		TN (Palani Hills, Madurai Dist)	
Crotalaria digitata	Fabaceae	E		TN	Rediscovered.
Crotalaria filipes	Fabaceae	I		KA (S Kanara)	
Crotalaria fysonii var. glabra	Fabaceae	E		Palani Hills	
Crotalaria globosa	Fabaceae	R		KA (Mysore), TN	
Crotalaria kodaiensis	Fabaceae	E		TN (Kodaikal hills)	
Crotalaria longipes	Fabaceae	E		TN (Kolli & Nilgiri hills)	
Crotalaria lutescens	Fabaceae	R		KA (South Kanara), MH	
Crotalaria noveoides	Fabaceae	I		ML	
Crotalaria peduncularis	Fabaceae	R		KL (Travancore), TN	
Crotalaria priestleyoides	Fabaceae	R		KA, TN	
Crotalaria rigida	Fabaceae	R		AP, KA, TN	
Crotalaria sandoorensis	Fabaceae	E		KA (Sandoor Hills, Bellary Dt)	
Crotalaria scabra	Fabaceae	R		TN	
Crotalaria shevaroyensis	Fabaceae	V		TN	
Cynometra beddomei	Fabaceae	V	Endangered	KL (Wayanad)	
Cynometra bourdillonii	Fabaceae	V	Endangered	KA	
Cynometra travancorica	Fabaceae	R	Endangered	KA, KL, TN	
Desmodium wightii	Fabaceae	R		TN (Nilgiri & Palani Hills)	
Desmodium wynaadense	Fabaceae	R		KL (Travancore Hills), TN	
Dialium travancoricum	Fabaceae	I	Critically endangered	KL	
Dolichos ciliatus	Fabaceae	I		TN (east coast)	
Eleiotis trifoliolata	Fabaceae	R		KA (eastern)	
Flemingia gracilis	Fabaceae	R		KA (Mysore Hills)	
Gleditsia assamica	Fabaceae	I	Vulnerable	(northeast)	
Hedysarum astragaloides	Fabaceae	R		HP, JK	
Humboldtia bourdillonii	Fabaceae	E	Endangered	KL (Peermade Ghats), TN (Courtallum Ghats)	
Humboldtia decurrens	Fabaceae	R	Lower risk/near threatened	KL (south WG)	
Humboldtia laurifolia	Fabaceae	E	Vulnerable	KL (Malabar) TN (Tirunelveli)	
Indigofera barberi	Fabaceae	R		AP, TN (east Ghats)	
Indigofera caerulea var. monosperma	Fabaceae	R		GJ, RJ	
Indigofera cedrorum	Fabaceae	I		HP, JK	
Indigofera constricta	Fabaceae	R		KA (Nikund Ghat), KL (Cochin)	
Indigofera simlensis	Fabaceae	I		HP	
Inga cynometroides	Fabaceae	I		KL (south Travancore Hills)	
Kingiodendron pinnatum	Fabaceae	R	Endangered	KA, KL, TN	
Lasiobema scandens var. horsefieldii	Fabaceae	I		AS, ML	
Mucuna minima	Fabaceae	I		OR (Sambalpur)	
Nogra dalzellii	Fabaceae	V		KA, MH	
Nogra filicaulis	Fabaceae	E		Madhya Pradesh	
Phanera khasiana	Fabaceae	I	Least concern	AR, ML	
Phanera nicobarica	Fabaceae	I		Nicobar Is.	
Phanera wallichii	Fabaceae	I		ML, AS	
Pterocarpus santalinus	Fabaceae	E	Near threatened	S. India	
Pueraria bella	Fabaceae	R		AR	
Rhynchosia beddomei	Fabaceae	R		AP (Cuddapah), KA (Bellary)	
Rhynchosia velutina	Fabaceae	V		TN	
Sesbania paludosa	Fabaceae	I		KL (Travancore)	
Smithia agharkarii	Fabaceae	R		MH	
Smithia venkobarowii	Fabaceae	I		KL (Peermade, Travancore Hills)	
Tephrosia barberi	Fabaceae	R		TN	
Tephrosia calophylla	Fabaceae	R		TN	
Tephrosia collina var. lanuginocarpa	Fabaceae	I		GJ, RJ	
Tephrosia jamnagerensis	Fabaceae	R		GJ	
Tephrosia pentaphylla	Fabaceae	I		KA (Bellary)	
Tephrosia wynaadensis	Fabaceae	R		KL	
Thermopsis inflata	Fabaceae	I		HP, JK	
Vicia benthamiana	Fabaceae	I		JK	
Vigna khandalensis	Fabaceae	R	Near threatened	MH	
Hydnocarpus macrocarpa subsp. macrocarpa	Flacourtiaceae	E		southern W. Ghats	
Exacum anamalayanum	Gentianaceae	I		TN	
Exacum atropurpureum	Gentianaceae	I		TN (Upper Kodayar area)	
Exacum courtallense var. courtallense	Gentianaceae	I		TN	
Gentiana cachemirica	Gentianaceae	E		JK (Kounsarg)	
Gentiana crassuloides	Gentianaceae	R		AR, Sikkim, UK	
Gentiana infelix	Gentianaceae	R		HP, Sikkim, UK	
Gentiana sagjinoides	Gentianaceae	R		Kumaon	
Swertia beddomei	Gentianaceae	I		KA (South Kanara, Mysore), KL, TN (Nilgiris)	
Geranium tuberaria	Geraniaceae	I		(W. Himalaya)	
Cyrtandra burttii	Gesneriaceae	I		Nicobar Is. (Great Nicobar)	
Cyrtandra occidentalis	Gesneriaceae	I		Nicobar Is. (Gt. Nicobar Is.)	
Didymocarpus fischeri	Gesneriaceae	I		TN	
Didymocarpus meeboldii	Gesneriaceae	I		KL, TN	
Didymocarpus missionis	Gesneriaceae	R		TN	
Didymocarpus ovalifolia	Gesneriaceae	I		TN	
Rhynchoglossum lazulinum	Gesneriaceae	R		AR	
Deutzia amurensis	Hydrangeaceae	I		(NW Himalaya)	
Hypericum japonicum var. major	Hypericaceae	I		TN	
Apodytes benthamiana	Metteniusaceae	I		ML (Khasi & Jaintia hills), TN	
Gomphandra comosa	Stemonuraceae	R	Vulnerable	Andaman Is. (south), Nicobar Is.	
Iodes hookeriana	Icacinaceae	I		ML	
Ixonanthes khasiana	Ixonanthaceae	V	Vulnerable	Cachar, AS, Khasi, Jaintia Hills	
Acrocephalus palniensis	Lamiaceae	I		TN (Madurai)	
Acrocephalus sericeus	Lamiaceae	I		TN	
Acrocephalus suffruticosus	Lamiaceae	I		TN	
Acrocephalus wightii	Lamiaceae	I		TN	
Anisochilus argenteus	Lamiaceae	V		(south)	
Anisochilus wightii	Lamiaceae	R		TN	
Dysophylla rugosa	Lamiaceae	I		TN (Tirunelveli District)	
Elsholtzia densa	Lamiaceae	I		HP, JK, UK	
Leucas angustissima	Lamiaceae	R		KA (Gersoppa Ghat, north Kanara)	
Leucas mukerjiana	Lamiaceae	E		AP	
Leucas pubescens	Lamiaceae	I		TN	
Leucas wightiana	Lamiaceae	I		TN (Kanyakumari)	
Nepeta camestris	Lamiaceae	I		HP, JK, UK	
Nepeta paucifolia	Lamiaceae	I		JK	
Plectranthus beddomei	Lamiaceae	I		TN (Tirunelveli Hills)	
Plectranthus bishopianus	Lamiaceae	Ex/E		TN (Palani Hills, Madurai Dist)	
Plectranthus bourneae	Lamiaceae	I		TN	
Plectranthus deccanicus	Lamiaceae	I		TN	
Pogostemon atropurpureus	Lamiaceae	R		TN (Sispara Ghat, Nilgiri)	
Pogostemon gardneri	Lamiaceae	I		KL (Wayanad), TN (Nilgiris)	
Pogostemon nilagiricus	Lamiaceae	E		TN (Nilgiri Hills)	
Pogostemon paludosus	Lamiaceae	E		TN (Nilgiri Hills)	
Pogostemon travancoricus	Lamiaceae	R		KL (Trivandrum District)	
Scutellaria andamanica	Lamiaceae	R		Andaman Is. (South)	
Teucrium plectranthoides	Lamiaceae	V		TN (Tirunelveli Hills)	
Actinodaphne bourneae	Lauraceae	E	Endangered	TN (Kodaikal, Palani hills)	
Actinodaphne campanulata var. campanulata	Lauraceae	I	Vulnerable	TN (Tirunelveli Hills)	
Actinodaphne campanulata var. obtusa	Lauraceae	I	Endangered	KL (Travancore)	
Actinodaphne lanata	Lauraceae	E	Critically endangered	TN (Nilgiri Hills)	
Actinodaphne lawsonii	Lauraceae	R	Vulnerable	KL (south-east Wayanad), TN (Nilgiris)	
Actinodaphne salicina	Lauraceae	I	Endangered	Nilgiris	
Alseodaphne semecarpifolia var. angustifolia	Lauraceae	I		TN	
Beilschmiedia bourdilloni	Lauraceae	I		KA (South Kanara), KL	
Beilschmiedia wightii	Lauraceae	I		KL (Travancore Hills), TN	
Cinnamomum glanduliferum	Lauraceae	I	Least concern	UK	
Cinnamomum macrocarpum	Lauraceae	R	Vulnerable	TN (Nilgiri Hills)	
Cinnamomum perrottetii	Lauraceae	R	Endangered	Nilgiris	
Cinnamomum riparium	Lauraceae	R	Endangered	KA, KL, TN	
Cinnamomum travancoricum	Lauraceae	V	Critically endangered	KL	
Cryptocarya ferrarsii	Lauraceae	I		Andaman Is. (Middle)	
Cryptocarya stocksii	Lauraceae	I	Vulnerable	KA, KL, TN	
Litsea leiantha	Lauraceae	V	Endangered	Andaman Is. (South)	
Litsea mysorensis	Lauraceae	I		KA, KL	
Litsea travancorica	Lauraceae	I	Endangered	KL (Travancore Hills)	
Neolitsea andamanica	Lauraceae	I		Andaman Is.	
Neolitsea nicobarica	Lauraceae	I		Nicobar Is.	
Leea aquata	Leeaceae	I		OR (Ganjam forests)	
Leea cinera	Leeaceae	I		KL (Palghat Cherry, Malabar)	
Leea venkobarowii	Leeaceae	I		KL (Travancore), TN	
Utricularia cecilii	Lentibulariaceae	I	Endangered	KA	
Hugonia belli	Linaceae	R		KA, KL	
Strychnos colubrina	Loganiaceae	I		AP (Veligonda), KA, KL	
Strychnos narcondamensis	Loganiaceae	I		Nicobars	
Lagerstroemia minuticarpa	Lythraceae	R	Endangered	AS, Sikkim	
Lagerstroemia rottleri	Lythraceae	I		India	
Lagerstroemia thomsonii	Lythraceae	I		KA, TN	
Rotala floribunda	Lythraceae	I	Vulnerable	MH (Mahabaleshwar hills)	
Rotala malampuzhensis	Lythraceae	I	Least concern	KL	
Rotala occultiflora	Lythraceae	I	Least concern	KL (Malabar coast), MP	
Rotala ritchiei	Lythraceae	V	Endangered	KA (Belgaum), MH (Pune District)	
Magnolia griffithii	Magnoliaceae	I	Data deficient	AS	
Magnolia gustavii	Magnoliaceae	I	Critically endangered	AS	
Michelia punduana	Magnoliaceae	R		ML (Khasi hills), NL	
Pachylarnax pleiocarpa	Magnoliaceae	I		AS (Lakhimpur)	
Aspidopterys canarensis	Malpighiaceae	R		KA, KL, MH	
Aspidopterys tomentosa var. hutchinsonii	Malpighiaceae	R		OR (Mayurbhanj Hills)	
Abutilon bidentatum var. major	Malvaceae	I		RJ (west)	
Abutilon fruticosum var. chrysocarpa	Malvaceae	I		RJ (Jaisalmer)	
Abutilon ramosum	Malvaceae	I		KA, KL	
Abutilon ranadei	Malvaceae	Ex/E		MH	
Decaschistia rufa	Malvaceae	E		TN	
Decaschistia triloba	Malvaceae	I		KA	
Pavonia arabica var. glutinosa	Malvaceae	I		RJ (Jaiselmer, Barmer, Jodhpur)	
Kendrickia walkeri	Melastomataceae	E		TN, KL	
Memecylon deccanense	Melastomataceae	I		KL	
Memecylon flavescens	Melastomataceae	E	Endangered	TN (Nilgiri Hills)	
Memecylon lawsonii	Melastomataceae	I	Vulnerable	TN	
Memecylon madgolense	Melastomataceae	I		AP	
Memecylon sisparense	Melastomataceae	I	Critically endangered	TN (Nilgiri Hills)	
Memecylon wightiana	Melastomataceae	I		KL (Malabar, Travancore coast)	
Osbeckia aspera	Melastomataceae	I		KL (Travancore coast)	
Osbeckia lawsoni	Melastomataceae	I		KL	
Osbeckia stellata var. hispidissima	Melastomataceae	I		AP (Vizakapatam District), KA (Vastara), OR (Ganjam)	
Osbeckia travancorica	Melastomataceae	I		KL (lower hills, Travancore)	
Sonerila barnesii	Melastomataceae	I		TN (Nadugani, Tirunelveli Hills)	
Sonerila elegans	Melastomataceae	I		TN	
Sonerila nemakadensis	Melastomataceae	I		KL (Travancore)	
Sonerila pulneyensis	Melastomataceae	I		TN	
Dysoxylum beddomei	Meliaceae	I	Endangered	KL (Peermade & Cardomom Hills)	
Dysoxylum ficiforme	Meliaceae	I	Vulnerable	KL (Koni & Ranni valleys)	
Albertisia mecistophylla	Menispermaceae	I		AS, ML	
Coscinium fenestratum	Menispermaceae	E	Data deficient	India	
Cyclea debiliflora	Menispermaceae	I		ML	
Cyclea fissicalyx	Menispermaceae	E		KL (Wayanad, Malabar)	
Cyclea watti	Menispermaceae	I		NL	
Stephania andamanica	Menispermaceae	I		Andaman Is. (South Andaman Island)	
Tinospora andamanica	Menispermaceae	I		Andaman Is.	
Ficus andamanica	Moraceae	R	Endangered	South Andaman Islands)	
Ficus costata	Moraceae	I		Nicobar Is.	
Gymnacranthera canarica	Myristicaceae	I	Vulnerable	KA, KL	
Horsfieldia macrocarpa var. canarioides	Myristicaceae	I		Andaman Is.	
Myristica malabarica	Myristicaceae	E	Vulnerable	KL	
Antistrophe serratifolia	Primulaceae	R		KL (Silent Valley; Nilgiris), TN	
Ardisia amplexicaulis	Primulaceae	I	Endangered	KL	
Ardisia quinquangularis	Primulaceae	I		ML	
Ardisia rhynchophylla	Primulaceae	I		ML (Cherrapunji, Khasi Hills)	
Embelia gardneriana	Primulaceae	I		TN (Sispara Ghat, Nilgiri)	
Embelia microcalyx	Primulaceae	I		Nicobar Is. (Katchal Is.)	
Rapanea striata	Primulaceae	I	Endangered	KA (Mysore)	
Rapanea thwaitesii	Primulaceae	I		TN (Palani Hills, Madurai Dist)	
Cleistocalyx nicobaricus	Myrtaceae	I		Nicobar Is. (Katchal Is.)	
Eugenia argentea	Myrtaceae	Ex/E		KL (Wayanad forests)	
Eugenia cotinifolia subsp.codyensis	Myrtaceae	I		KA (Coorg, south Kanara), KL (Travancore), TN (Nilgiri Hills)	
Eugenia discifera	Myrtaceae	E	Endangered	KL, TN (Sethur Hills, Kamarajar Dt)	
Eugenia floccosa	Myrtaceae	I	Endangered	TN	
Eugenia jossinia	Myrtaceae	I		TN	
Eugenia singampattiana	Myrtaceae	Ex/E	Critically endangered	TN (Papasam & Singampatti)	
Meteoromyrtus wynaadensis	Myrtaceae	E	Critically endangered	TN	
Syzygium andamanicum	Myrtaceae	I	Critically endangered	Andaman Is.	
Syzygium beddomei	Myrtaceae	I	Endangered	TN	
Syzygium benthamianum	Myrtaceae	I	Vulnerable	TN (Sispara, Nilgiri Hills)	
Syzygium bourdillonii	Myrtaceae	Ex/E	Endangered	KL (Merchiston; Colatoorpolay)	
Syzygium chavaran	Myrtaceae	I	Endangered	KL (north Travancore)	
Syzygium courtallense	Myrtaceae	E	Critically endangered	TN (Courtallum Hills)	
Syzygium gambleanum	Myrtaceae	E		TN (Kannyakumari)	
Syzygium kurzii var. andamanica	Myrtaceae	I		Andaman Is.	
Syzygium manii	Myrtaceae	R	Critically endangered	Andaman Is.	
Syzygium myhendrae	Myrtaceae	I	Endangered	KL (Travancore Hills), TN (Tirunelveli Hills)	
Syzygium occidentalis	Myrtaceae	I		KL	
Syzygium palghatense	Myrtaceae	Ex/E	Critically endangered	KL (Palghat Hills)	
Syzygium rama-varmae	Myrtaceae	I		KL (Travancore Hills), TN (Tirunelveli Hills)	
Syzygium stocksii	Myrtaceae	I	Endangered	KA (South Kanara), KL (Wayanad Hills)	
Syzygium travancoricum	Myrtaceae	E	Critically endangered	KL (south)	
Abrus fruticulosus	Fabaceae		Data deficient		
Acacia donaldii	Fabaceae		Data deficient		
Acer caesium subsp. caesium	Sapindaceae		Data deficient		
Acer hookeri	Sapindaceae		Data deficient		
Acer osmastonii	Sapindaceae		Vulnerable		
Acer pinnatinervium	Sapindaceae		Data deficient		
Acer tibetense	Sapindaceae		Vulnerable		
Aconitum chasmanthum	Ranunculaceae		Critically endangered		
Aconitum heterophyllum	Ranunculaceae		Endangered		
Aconitum violaceum	Ranunculaceae		Vulnerable		
Aegialitis rotundifolia	Plumbaginaceae		Near threatened		
Agasthiyamalaia pauciflora	Clusiaceae		Critically endangered		
Aglaia apiocarpa	Meliaceae		Vulnerable		
Aglaia argentea	Meliaceae		Lower risk/least concern		
Aglaia bourdillonii	Meliaceae		Vulnerable		
Aglaia crassinervia	Meliaceae		Lower risk/near threatened		
Aglaia cucullata	Meliaceae		Data deficient		
Aglaia edulis	Meliaceae		Lower risk/near threatened		
Aglaia elaeagnoidea	Meliaceae		Lower risk/least concern		
Aglaia korthalsii	Meliaceae		Lower risk/near threatened		
Aglaia lawii	Meliaceae		Lower risk/least concern		
Aglaia malabarica	Meliaceae		Critically endangered		
Aglaia odoratissima	Meliaceae		Lower risk/least concern		
Aglaia oligophylla	Meliaceae		Lower risk/near threatened		
Aglaia perviridis	Meliaceae		Vulnerable		
Aglaia silvestris	Meliaceae		Lower risk/near threatened		
Aglaia simplicifolia	Meliaceae		Lower risk/near threatened		
Aglaia tomentosa	Meliaceae		Lower risk/least concern		
Ailanthus integrifolia	Simaroubaceae		Lower risk/least concern		
Aldrovanda vesiculosa	Droseraceae		Endangered		
Alstonia scholaris	Apocynaceae		Lower risk/least concern		
Ammannia nagpurensis	Lythraceae		Endangered		
Anacyclus pyrethrum	Asteraceae		Vulnerable		
Anaphalis leptophylla	Asteraceae		Vulnerable		
Anaphalis wightiana	Asteraceae		Vulnerable		
Angelica glauca	Apiaceae		Endangered		
Aporosa bourdillonii	Phyllanthaceae		Endangered		
Aquilaria khasiana	Thymelaeaceae		Critically endangered		
Aquilaria malaccensis	Thymelaeaceae		Critically endangered		
Aralia malabarica	Araliaceae		Vulnerable		
Ardisia blatteri	Primulaceae		Endangered		
Ardisia sonchifolia	Primulaceae		Endangered		
Astragalus langtangensis	Fabaceae		Data deficient		
Astragalus pseudochlorostachys	Fabaceae		Data deficient		
Atuna indica	Chrysobalanaceae		Endangered		
Bauhinia diphylla	Fabaceae		Near threatened		
Beilschmiedia clarkei	Lauraceae		Vulnerable		
Betula utilis subsp. jacquemontii	Betulaceae		Data deficient		
Bhesa paniculata	Celastraceae		Lower risk/least concern		
Bhesa robusta	Celastraceae		Lower risk/least concern		
Biancaea sappan	Fabaceae		Lower risk/least concern		
Bonnayodes limnophiloides	Scrophulariaceae		Data deficient		
Brackenridgea hookeri	Ochnaceae		Lower risk/least concern		
Brownlowia tersa	Malvaceae		Near threatened		
Butea monosperma var. lutea	Fabaceae		Data deficient		
Cajanus cajanifolius	Fabaceae		Near threatened		
Calophyllum apetalum	Calophyllaceae		Vulnerable		
Calophyllum soulattri	Calophyllaceae		Lower risk/least concern		
Calophyllum tetrapterum	Calophyllaceae		Lower risk/least concern		
Camellia siangensis	Theaceae		Data deficient		
Camellia sinensis	Theaceae		Data deficient		
Campylospermum serrata	Ochnaceae		Lower risk/least concern		
Campylotropis drummondii	Fabaceae		Data deficient		
Canthium neilgherrense var. neilgherrense	Rubiaceae		Vulnerable		
Carpinus faginea	Betulaceae		Data deficient		
Casearia wynadensis	Salicaceae		Vulnerable		
Cassine viburnifolia	Celastraceae		Lower risk/least concern		
Cayratia pedata	Vitaceae		Vulnerable		
Cercis griffithii	Fabaceae		Data deficient		
Ceriops decandra	Rhizophoraceae		Near threatened		
Chamaecrista absus	Fabaceae		Least concern		
Chamaecrista kolabensis	Fabaceae		Endangered		
Chionanthus leprocarpa var. courtallensis	Oleaceae		Endangered		
Chionanthus linocieroides	Oleaceae		Endangered		
Chisocheton macrophyllus	Meliaceae		Least concern		
Chloroxylon swietenia	Rutaceae		Vulnerable		
Cinnadenia paniculata	Lauraceae		Lower risk/least concern		
Cinnamomum bejolghota	Lauraceae		Least concern		
Cinnamomum champokianum	Lauraceae		Critically endangered		
Cinnamomum chemungianum	Lauraceae		Critically endangered		
Cinnamomum dubium	Lauraceae		Least concern		
Cinnamomum filipedicellatum	Lauraceae		Endangered		
Cinnamomum gamblei	Lauraceae		Endangered		
Cinnamomum goaense	Lauraceae		Endangered		
Cinnamomum heyneanum	Lauraceae		Endangered		
Cinnamomum impressinervium	Lauraceae		Vulnerable		
Cinnamomum keralaense	Lauraceae		Endangered		
Cinnamomum malabatrum	Lauraceae		Least concern		
Cinnamomum sulphuratum	Lauraceae		Vulnerable		
Cinnamomum tamala	Lauraceae		Least concern		
Cinnamomum walaiwarense	Lauraceae		Critically endangered		
Cinnamomum wightii	Lauraceae		Endangered		
Cleistanthus malabaricus	Phyllanthaceae		Vulnerable		
Cleistanthus oblongifolius	Phyllanthaceae		Least concern		
Cleistanthus travancorensis	Phyllanthaceae		Endangered		
Clerodendrum japonicum	Lamiaceae		Least concern		
Clethra delavayi	Clethraceae		Least concern		
Clinopodium capitellatum	Lamiaceae		Least concern		
Coffea arabica	Rubiaceae		Endangered		
Coffea benghalensis	Rubiaceae		Least concern		
Coffea malabarica	Rubiaceae		Data deficient		
Coffea neobridsoniae	Rubiaceae		Endangered		
Coffea travancorensis	Rubiaceae		Vulnerable		
Coffea wightiana	Rubiaceae		Least concern		
Coldenia procumbens	Cordiaceae		Least concern		
Colvillea racemosa	Fabaceae		Least concern		
Commersonia bartramia	Malvaceae		Least concern		
Commiphora stocksiana	Burseraceae		Endangered		
Commiphora wightii	Burseraceae		Critically endangered		
Corylus jacquemontii	Betulaceae		Data deficient		
Cratoxylum cochinchinense	Hypericaceae		Lower risk/least concern		
Croton lawianus	Euphorbiaceae		Critically endangered		
Croton tiglium	Euphorbiaceae		Least concern		
Crudia balachandrae	Fabaceae		Vulnerable		
Cryptocarya anamalayana	Lauraceae		Endangered		
Cryptocarya beddomei	Lauraceae		Vulnerable		
Cryptocarya diversifolia	Lauraceae		Least concern		
Cryptocarya ferrarsi	Lauraceae		Critically endangered		
Curanga amara	Scrophulariaceae		Least concern		
Cyathocline purpurea	Asteraceae		Least concern		
Cynometra iripa	Fabaceae		Least concern		
Cynometra malaccensis	Fabaceae		Near threatened		
Cynometra ramiflora	Fabaceae		Least concern		
Cyphostemma auriculatum	Vitaceae		Data deficient		
Cyrtophyllum fragrans	Loganiaceae		Least concern		
Dalbergia assamica	Fabaceae		Least concern		
Dalbergia cana	Fabaceae		Least concern		
Dalbergia congesta	Fabaceae		Endangered		
Dalbergia cultrata	Fabaceae		Near threatened		
Dalbergia latifolia	Fabaceae		Vulnerable		
Decalepis hamiltonii	Apocynaceae		Endangered		
Dichrostachys cinerea	Fabaceae		Least concern		
Dicraeia dichotoma	Podostemaceae		Near threatened		
Dillenia indica	Dilleniaceae		Least concern		
Dimorphocalyx beddomei	Euphorbiaceae		Endangered		
Diospyros atrata	Ebenaceae		Vulnerable		
Diospyros barberi	Ebenaceae		Vulnerable		
Diospyros candolleana	Ebenaceae		Vulnerable		
Diospyros crumenata	Ebenaceae		Endangered		
Diospyros ebenum	Ebenaceae		Data deficient		
Diospyros paniculata	Ebenaceae		Vulnerable		
Diospyros trichophylla	Ebenaceae		Vulnerable		
Dipentodon sinicus	Dipentodontaceae		Lower risk/least concern		
Dipterocarpus alatus	Dipterocarpaceae		Vulnerable		
Dipterocarpus costatus	Dipterocarpaceae		Vulnerable		
Dipterocarpus gracilis	Dipterocarpaceae		Vulnerable		
Dipterocarpus grandiflorus	Dipterocarpaceae		Endangered		
Dipterocarpus hasseltii	Dipterocarpaceae		Endangered		
Dipterocarpus indicus	Dipterocarpaceae		Endangered		
Dipterocarpus retusus	Dipterocarpaceae		Endangered		
Dipterocarpus tuberculatus	Dipterocarpaceae		Near threatened		
Dipterocarpus turbinatus	Dipterocarpaceae		Vulnerable		
Drypetes porteri	Putranjivaceae		Endangered		
Drypetes travancoria	Putranjivaceae		Endangered		
Drypetes wightii	Putranjivaceae		Vulnerable		
Dysoxylum malabaricum	Meliaceae		Endangered		
Elaeagnus conferta subsp. dendroidea	Elaeagnaceae		Critically endangered		
Elaeocarpus prunifolius	Elaeocarpaceae		Vulnerable		
Elatine ambigua	Elatinaceae		Least concern		
Eleiotis rottleri	Fabaceae		Vulnerable		
Engelhardtia spicata	Juglandaceae		Lower risk/least concern		
Eugenia calcadensis	Myrtaceae		Vulnerable		
Eugenia cotinifolia subsp. codyensis	Myrtaceae		Endangered		
Eugenia indica	Myrtaceae		Endangered		
Eugenia rottleriana	Myrtaceae		Vulnerable		
Euphorbia epiphylloides	Euphorbiaceae		Endangered		
Euphorbia mayurnathanii	Euphorbiaceae		Extinct in the Wild		
Euphorbia santapaui	Euphorbiaceae		Endangered		
Euphorbia tirucalli	Euphorbiaceae		Least concern		
Euphorbia vajravelui	Euphorbiaceae		Vulnerable		
Euptelea pleiosperma	Eupteleaceae		Lower risk/least concern		
Excoecaria indica	Euphorbiaceae		Data deficient		
Fagraea auriculata	Loganiaceae		Least concern		
Farmeria indica	Podostemaceae		Endangered		
Farmeria metzgerioides	Podostemaceae		Vulnerable		
Ficus abelii	Moraceae		Least concern		
Ficus albipila	Moraceae		Least concern		
Ficus altissima	Moraceae		Least concern		
Ficus ampelos	Moraceae		Least concern		
Ficus angladei	Moraceae		Critically endangered		
Fraxinus hookeri	Oleaceae		Data deficient		
Fraxinus micrantha	Oleaceae		Data deficient		
Garcinia travancorica	Clusiaceae		Vulnerable		
Garcinia wightii	Clusiaceae		Vulnerable		
Gardenia gummifera	Rubiaceae		Lower risk/least concern		
Gentiana kurroo	Gentianaceae		Critically endangered		
Glochidion ellipticum var. ralphii	Phyllanthaceae		Endangered		
Glochidion johnstonei	Phyllanthaceae		Vulnerable		
Glochidion sisparense	Phyllanthaceae		Endangered		
Glochidion tomentosum	Phyllanthaceae		Endangered		
Gluta travancorica	Anacardiaceae		Lower risk/near threatened		
Glycosmis pentaphylla	Rutaceae		Least concern		
Glyptopetalum lawsonii	Celastraceae		Vulnerable		
Gymnocladus assamicus	Fabaceae		Critically endangered		
Gymnosporia senegalensis	Celastraceae		Least concern		
Gynura travancorica	Asteraceae		Near threatened		
Heritiera fomes	Malvaceae		Endangered		
Homalium jainii	Salicaceae		Endangered		
Homalium travancoricum	Salicaceae		Vulnerable		
Homonoia retusa	Euphorbiaceae		Least concern		
Homonoia riparia	Euphorbiaceae		Least concern		
Hopea canarensis	Dipterocarpaceae		Endangered		
Hopea glabra	Dipterocarpaceae		Endangered		
Hopea helferi	Dipterocarpaceae		Endangered		
Hopea odorata	Dipterocarpaceae		Vulnerable		
Hopea parviflora	Dipterocarpaceae		Least concern		
Hopea ponga	Dipterocarpaceae		Endangered		
Hopea racophloea	Dipterocarpaceae		Endangered		
Hopea shingkeng	Dipterocarpaceae		Extinct		
Hopea utilis	Dipterocarpaceae		Endangered		
Hoppea dichotoma	Gentianaceae		Least concern		
Hoppea fastigiata	Gentianaceae		Least concern		
Hovenia acerba	Rhamnaceae		Least concern		
Humboldtia unijuga var. trijuga	Fabaceae		Critically endangered		
Humboldtia unijuga var. unijuga	Fabaceae		Endangered		
Humboldtia vahliana	Fabaceae		Endangered		
Hunteria zeylanica	Apocynaceae		Least concern		
Hydnocarpus kurzii	Achariaceae		Data deficient		
Hydnocarpus macrocarpus subsp. macrocarpa	Achariaceae		Vulnerable		
Hydnocarpus pentandrus	Achariaceae		Vulnerable		
Hygrophila madurensis	Acanthaceae		Critically endangered		
Ilex embelioides	Aquifoliaceae		Vulnerable		
Illicium griffithii	Schisandraceae		Endangered		
Illicium simonsii	Schisandraceae		Least concern		
Indigofera emmae	Fabaceae		Data deficient		
Intsia bijuga	Fabaceae		Vulnerable		
Isonandra stocksii	Sapotaceae		Endangered		
Itea chinensis	Iteaceae		Least concern		
Ixora grandifolia	Rubiaceae		Least concern		
Ixora malabarica	Rubiaceae		Vulnerable		
Jatropha nana	Euphorbiaceae		Vulnerable		
Juglans regia	Juglandaceae		Least concern		
Julostylis polyandra	Malvaceae		Endangered		
Justicia quinqueangularis	Acanthaceae		Least concern		
Kandelia candel	Rhizophoraceae		Least concern		
Kibara coriacea	Monimiaceae		Lower risk/least concern		
Kleinhovia hospita	Malvaceae		Least concern		
Knema andamanica subsp. andamanica	Myristicaceae		Vulnerable		
Knema andamanica subsp. nicobarica	Myristicaceae		Vulnerable		
Knema attenuata	Myristicaceae		Lower risk/least concern		
Knema globularia	Myristicaceae		Least concern		
Koenigia islandica	Polygonaceae		Least concern		
Kydia calycina	Malvaceae		Least concern		
Lagerstroemia indica	Lythraceae		Least concern		
Lamprachaenium microcephalum	Asteraceae		Endangered		
Lasianthus rostratus	Rubiaceae		Vulnerable		
Limnophila diffusa	Scrophulariaceae		Data deficient		
Limnophila glandulifera	Scrophulariaceae		Data deficient		
Limnophila heterophylla	Scrophulariaceae		Least concern		
Limnophila indica	Scrophulariaceae		Least concern		
Limnophila micrantha	Scrophulariaceae		Least concern		
Limnophila polyantha	Scrophulariaceae		Data deficient		
Limnophila polystachya	Scrophulariaceae		Least concern		
Limnophila pulcherrima	Scrophulariaceae		Data deficient		
Lindernia manilaliana	Linderniaceae		Endangered		
Lindernia minima	Linderniaceae	I	Endangered	TN	Chengalpet and Pudukottai
Litosanthes capitulatus	Rubiaceae		Vulnerable		
Litsea beddomei	Lauraceae		Endangered		
Litsea glutinosa	Lauraceae		Least concern		
Litsea laeta	Lauraceae		Least concern		
Litsea lancifolia	Lauraceae		Least concern		
Litsea ligustrina	Lauraceae		Vulnerable		
Litsea monopetala	Lauraceae		Least concern		
Litsea nigrescens	Lauraceae		Endangered		
Lophopetalum wightianum	Celastraceae		Lower risk/least concern		
Maesa velutina	Primulaceae		Endangered		
Magnolia caveana	Magnoliaceae		Data deficient		
Magnolia champaca	Magnoliaceae		Least concern		
Magnolia doltsopa	Magnoliaceae		Data deficient		
Magnolia globosa	Magnoliaceae		Least concern		
Magnolia hodgsonii	Magnoliaceae		Least concern		
Magnolia hookeri	Magnoliaceae		Data deficient		
Magnolia insignis	Magnoliaceae		Least concern		
Magnolia kingii	Magnoliaceae		Data deficient		
Magnolia kisopa	Magnoliaceae		Data deficient		
Magnolia lanuginosa	Magnoliaceae		Data deficient		
Magnolia liliifera	Magnoliaceae		Least concern		
Magnolia mannii	Magnoliaceae		Vulnerable		
Magnolia nilagirica	Magnoliaceae		Vulnerable		
Magnolia oblonga	Magnoliaceae		Least concern		
Magnolia pealiana	Magnoliaceae		Endangered		
Magnolia pleiocarpa	Magnoliaceae		Critically endangered		
Magnolia pterocarpa	Magnoliaceae		Data deficient		
Magnolia punduana	Magnoliaceae		Data deficient		
Magnolia rabaniana	Magnoliaceae		Data deficient		
Mallotus atrovirens	Euphorbiaceae		Vulnerable		
Malus sikkimensis	Rosaceae		Data deficient		
Mangifera acutigemma	Anacardiaceae		Data deficient		
Mangifera austro-indica	Anacardiaceae		Endangered		
Mangifera gedebe	Anacardiaceae		Near threatened		
Mangifera indica	Anacardiaceae		Data deficient		
Mangifera nicobarica	Anacardiaceae		Endangered		
Mangifera quadrifida var. quadrifida	Anacardiaceae		Lower risk/least concern		
Mangifera sylvatica	Anacardiaceae		Lower risk/least concern		
Mastixia arborea	Nyssaceae		Lower risk/least concern		
Mastixia trichotoma var. maingayi	Nyssaceae		Lower risk/least concern		
Memecylon subramanii	Melastomataceae		Endangered		
Microtropis densiflora	Celastraceae		Endangered		
Millettia fruticosa	Fabaceae		Data deficient		
Millettia glaucescens	Fabaceae		Least concern		
Millettia pachycarpa	Fabaceae		Least concern		
Millettia peguensis	Fabaceae		Data deficient		
Millettia pulchra	Fabaceae		Least concern		
Mimosa adenantheroides	Fabaceae		Least concern		
Mimosa pudica	Fabaceae		Least concern		
Mimulus orbicularis	Scrophulariaceae		Least concern		
Mimusops elengi	Sapotaceae		Least concern		
Mitrephora grandiflora	Annonaceae		Vulnerable		
Monoon shendurunii	Annonaceae		Endangered		
Monosis volkameriifolia	Asteraceae		Least concern		
Moonia heterophylla	Asteraceae		Near threatened		
Moullava tortuosa	Fabaceae		Data deficient		
Myristica andamanica	Myristicaceae		Vulnerable		
Myristica beddomei subsp. sphaerocarpa	Myristicaceae		Endangered		
Myristica beddomei subsp. ustulata	Myristicaceae		Endangered		
Myristica magnifica	Myristicaceae		Endangered		
Myrsine semiserrata	Primulaceae		Least concern		
Nardostachys jatamansi	Caprifoliaceae		Critically endangered		
Nasturtium officinale	Brassicaceae		Least concern		
Nauclea subdita	Rubiaceae		Least concern		
Neillia thyrsiflora	Rosaceae		Least concern		
Neolitsea fischeri	Lauraceae		Vulnerable		
Nilgirianthus ciliatus	Acanthaceae		Vulnerable		
Nostolachma crassifolia	Rubiaceae		Endangered		
Nothopegia beddomei var. wynaadica	Anacardiaceae		Endangered		
Nothopegia castanaefolia	Anacardiaceae		Critically endangered		
Nothopegia heyneana	Anacardiaceae		Lower risk/near threatened		
Nymphoides krishnakesara	Menyanthaceae		Endangered		
Nymphoides macrospermum	Menyanthaceae		Critically endangered		
Nymphoides sivarajanii	Menyanthaceae		Critically endangered		
Ormosia assamica	Fabaceae		Data deficient		
Oxytropis zemuensis	Fabaceae		Data deficient		
Padus napaulensis	Rosaceae		Least concern		
Palaquium bourdillonii	Sapotaceae		Vulnerable		
Palaquium obovatum	Sapotaceae		Least concern		
Palaquium ravii	Sapotaceae		Endangered		
Payena lucida	Sapotaceae		Near threatened		
Pentapanax leschenaultii	Araliaceae		Lower risk/least concern		
Photinia serratifolia var. tomentosa	Rosaceae		Endangered		
Phyllanthus indofischeri	Phyllanthaceae		Vulnerable		
Piper pedicellatum	Piperaceae		Vulnerable		
Pisonia aculeata	Nyctaginaceae		Least concern		
Pistacia khinjuk	Anacardiaceae		Least concern		
Pithecellobium gracile	Fabaceae		Vulnerable		
Pittosporum eriocarpum	Pittosporaceae		Endangered		
Pittosporum viridulum	Pittosporaceae		Critically endangered		
Plantago major	Plantaginaceae		Least concern		
Platanus orientalis	Platanaceae		Data deficient		
Platea latifolia	Metteniusaceae		Least concern		
Pleurostylia opposita	Celastraceae		Least concern		
Pluchea ovalis	Asteraceae		Least concern		
Podostemum munnarense	Podostemaceae		Endangered		
Pogostemon crassicaulis	Lamiaceae		Data deficient		
Pogostemon quadrifolius	Lamiaceae		Data deficient		
Polypleurum filifolium	Podostemaceae		Vulnerable		
Polypleurum stylosum	Podostemaceae		Least concern		
Polypleurum wallichii	Podostemaceae		Least concern		
Polyspora dipterosperma	Theaceae		Data deficient		
Prunus bifrons	Rosaceae		Data deficient		
Prunus bokhariensis	Rosaceae		Data deficient		
Prunus jaquemontii	Rosaceae		Data deficient		
Prunus javanica	Rosaceae		Lower risk/least concern		
Psidium guajava	Myrtaceae		Least concern		
Psidium guineense	Myrtaceae		Least concern		
Psychotria asiatica	Rubiaceae		Least concern		
Psychotria beddomei	Rubiaceae		Endangered		
Psychotria macrocarpa	Rubiaceae		Endangered		
Psychotria nilgiriensis var. astephana	Rubiaceae		Endangered		
Psydrax ficiformis	Rubiaceae		Endangered		
Psydrax pergracilis	Rubiaceae		Endangered		
Pterocarpus dalbergioides	Fabaceae		Vulnerable		
Pterocarpus indicus	Fabaceae		Endangered		
Pterocarpus marsupium	Fabaceae		Near threatened		
Pyrenaria barringtoniifolia	Theaceae		Data deficient		
Pyrenaria cherrapunjeana	Theaceae		Critically endangered		
Quercus vestita	Fagaceae		Data deficient		
Rhododendron rex	Ericaceae		Lower risk/near threatened		
Rhynchosia heynei	Fabaceae		Vulnerable		
Rotala cookii	Lythraceae		Endangered		
Rotala malabarica	Lythraceae		Critically endangered		
Rotala mexicana	Lythraceae		Least concern		
Rotala rosea	Lythraceae		Least concern		
Rotala rotundifolia	Lythraceae		Least concern		
Rotala serpyllifolia	Lythraceae		Least concern		
Rotala verticillaris	Lythraceae		Least concern		
Ryparosa javanica	Achariaceae		Least concern		
Salacia oblonga	Celastraceae		Vulnerable		
Salix acmophylla	Salicaceae		Least concern		
Salix excelsa	Salicaceae		Least concern		
Salix sericocarpa	Salicaceae		Least concern		
Salix tetrasperma	Salicaceae		Least concern		
Salix viminalis	Salicaceae		Least concern		
Sambucus javanica	Viburnaceae		Least concern		
Santalum album	Santalaceae		Vulnerable		
Saraca asoca	Fabaceae		Vulnerable		
Sarcosperma arboreum	Sapotaceae		Least concern		
Saurauia napaulensis	Actinidiaceae		Least concern		
Saurauia roxburghii	Actinidiaceae		Least concern		
Saurauia tristyla	Actinidiaceae		Least concern		
Heptapleurum ellipticum	Araliaceae		Least concern		
Heptapleurum heptaphyllum	Araliaceae		Least concern		
Heptapleurum digitatum	Araliaceae		Lower risk/least concern		
Schima khasiana	Theaceae		Least concern		
Schima wallichii	Theaceae		Least concern		
Schleichera oleosa	Sapindaceae		Least concern		
Schoepfia fragrans	Schoepfiaceae		Least concern		
Scleropyrum wallichianum	Santalaceae		Lower risk/least concern		
Sesbania concolor	Fabaceae		Data deficient		
Sesbania javanica	Fabaceae		Least concern		
Sesbania sesban	Fabaceae		Least concern		
Sesbania speciosa	Fabaceae		Vulnerable		
Shirakiopsis indica	Euphorbiaceae		Least concern		
Shorea assamica	Dipterocarpaceae		Least concern		
Shorea assamica subsp. assamica	Dipterocarpaceae		Critically endangered		
Shorea robusta	Dipterocarpaceae		Lower risk/least concern		
Shorea roxburghii	Dipterocarpaceae		Vulnerable		
Silene vulgaris	Caryophyllaceae		Least concern		
Siphonodon celastrineus	Celastraceae		Lower risk/least concern		
Skimmia arborescens	Rutaceae		Least concern		
Sloanea assamica	Elaeocarpaceae		Lower risk/least concern		
Sloanea dasycarpa	Elaeocarpaceae		Least concern		
Sloanea tomentosa	Elaeocarpaceae		Lower risk/least concern		
Smithia blanda	Fabaceae		Least concern		
Smithia hirsuta	Fabaceae		Least concern		
Smithia sensitiva	Fabaceae		Least concern		
Solanum purpureilineatum	Solanaceae		Near threatened		
Sonneratia alba	Lythraceae		Least concern		
Sonneratia apetala	Lythraceae		Least concern		
Sonneratia caseolaris	Lythraceae		Least concern		
Sonneratia griffithii	Lythraceae		Critically endangered		
Sophora wightii	Fabaceae		Endangered		
Sorbus corymbifera	Rosaceae		Least concern		
Sorbus foliolosa	Rosaceae		Least concern		
Sorbus rufopilosa	Rosaceae		Least concern		
Sorbus wallichii	Rosaceae		Lower risk/least concern		
Spathodea campanulata	Bignoniaceae		Least concern		
Spatholobus parviflorus	Fabaceae		Least concern		
Spatholobus pottingeri	Fabaceae		Least concern		
Sphaeranthus africanus	Asteraceae		Least concern		
Sphaeranthus amaranthoides	Asteraceae		Least concern		
Sphaeranthus indicus	Asteraceae		Least concern		
Sphaeranthus senegalensis	Asteraceae		Least concern		
Sphenoclea zeylanica	Sphenocleaceae		Least concern		
Spiraea canescens	Rosaceae		Least concern		
Stachyurus himalaicus	Stachyuraceae		Least concern		
Sterculia parviflora	Malvaceae		Lower risk/least concern		
Symplocos macrocarpa subsp. kanarana	Symplocaceae		Vulnerable		
Symplocos nairii	Symplocaceae		Endangered		
Symplocos oligandra	Symplocaceae		Endangered		
Symplocos pulchra subsp. coriacea	Symplocaceae		Endangered		
Symplocos ramosissima	Symplocaceae		Least concern		
Syzygium acuminatissimum	Myrtaceae		Least concern		
Syzygium alternifolium	Myrtaceae		Endangered		
Syzygium claviflorum	Myrtaceae		Least concern		
Syzygium cumini	Myrtaceae		Least concern		
Syzygium densiflorum	Myrtaceae		Vulnerable		
Syzygium jambos	Myrtaceae		Least concern		
Syzygium microphyllum	Myrtaceae		Endangered		
Syzygium nervosum	Myrtaceae		Least concern		
Syzygium occidentale	Myrtaceae		Vulnerable		
Syzygium parameswaranii	Myrtaceae		Endangered		
Syzygium ramavarma	Myrtaceae		Vulnerable		
Syzygium samarangense	Myrtaceae		Least concern		
Syzygium sanjappanum	Myrtaceae		Data deficient		
Syzygium utilis	Myrtaceae		Data deficient		
Syzygium zeylanicum var. ellipticum	Myrtaceae		Endangered		
Tabernaemontana gamblei	Apocynaceae		Lower risk/conservation dependent		
Tabernaemontana heyneana	Apocynaceae		Lower risk/near threatened		
Tamarix kutchensis	Tamaricaceae		Endangered		
Tarenna attenuata	Rubiaceae		Least concern		
Tarenna monosperma	Rubiaceae		Endangered		
Tarenna nilagirica	Rubiaceae		Vulnerable		
Tephrosia jamnagarensis	Fabaceae		Endangered		
Terminalia pallida	Combretaceae		Vulnerable		
Terminalia procera	Combretaceae		Least concern		
Tetradium ruticarpum	Rutaceae		Least concern		
Tetrameles nudiflora	Tetramelaceae		Lower risk/least concern		
Tribulus rajasthanensis	Zygophyllaceae		Critically endangered		
Utricularia albocaerulea	Lentibulariaceae		Vulnerable		
Utricularia christopheri	Lentibulariaceae		Data deficient		
Utricularia praeterita	Lentibulariaceae		Near threatened		
Utricularia wightiana	Lentibulariaceae		Vulnerable		
Valeriana leschenaultii	Caprifoliaceae		Critically endangered		
Vandellia anagallis	Linderniaceae		Least concern		
Vandellia micrantha	Linderniaceae		Least concern		
Vandellia montana	Linderniaceae		Least concern		
Vandellia pusilla	Linderniaceae		Least concern		
Vandellia viscosa	Linderniaceae		Least concern		
Vateria indica	Dipterocarpaceae		Vulnerable		
Vatica chinensis	Dipterocarpaceae		Critically endangered		
Vatica lanceifolia	Dipterocarpaceae		Critically endangered		
Vigna aconitifolia	Fabaceae		Data deficient		
Willisia selaginoides	Podostemaceae		Vulnerable		
Woodfordia fruticosa	Lythraceae		Lower risk/least concern		
Xylosma latifolia, synonym of Flacourtia latifolia	Salicaceae		Endangered		
Zornia quilonensis	Fabaceae		Data deficient		
Nepenthes khasiana	Nepenthaceae	I	Endangered	AS (Khasi hills), ML (Jaintia Hills)	
Anacolosa densiflora	Olacaceae	I	Endangered	KL (Travancore Hills), TN	
Olax imbricata var. membranifolia	Olacaceae	I		Nicobar Is. (Katchal Is.)	
Henslowia erythrocarpa	Oleaceae	I		Nicobar Is. (Kamorta Is.)	
Jasminum andamanicum	Oleaceae	I		Andaman Is. (South and Middle Andamans)	
Jasminum unifoliolatum	Oleaceae	R		Saddle Peak, N. Andamans)	
Jasminum wightii	Oleaceae	I		TN (Coimbatore)	
Ligustrum decaisnei var. beddomei	Oleaceae	I		KA (Kiggatd, Coorg)	
Epilobium glaciale	Onagraceae	I		JK	
Corydalis cashmeriana	Papaveraceae	E		JK (Mahdev)	
Meconopsis aculeata	Papaveraceae	E		JK	
Meconopsis latifolia	Papaveraceae	V		JK (Kashmir Himalaya)	
Papaver himalaicum	Papaveraceae	I		JK	
Piper barberi	Piperaceae	R	Endangered	TN (southern W. Ghats)	
Piper haprium	Piperaceae	I		KL (Travancore Hills), TN (Tirunelveli Hills)	
PPiper pykarahense	Piperaceae	I		TN (Nilgiri Hills)	
PPittosporum eriocarpum	Pittosporaceae	I		HP, UK (Kumaon)	
Hydrobryopsis sessilis	Podostemaceae	I	Least concern	KA	
Indotristicha tirunelveliana	Podostemaceae	I	Near threatened	TN (Tirunelveli Hills)	
Willisia selagonoides	Podostemaceae	R		KL	
Zeylanidium johnsonii	Podostemaceae	I		KL (Malabar)	
Polygala tricholopha	Polygalaceae	I		AS, ML	
Androsace aizoon	Primulaceae	I		JK	
Androsace mucronifolia	Primulaceae	I		JK	
Primula clarkei	Primulaceae	I		JK	
Primula drumondiana	Primulaceae	I		HP	
Primula minutissima	Primulaceae	E		JK (Apharwat Mts)	
Helicia nilagirica	Proteaceae	I	Least concern	KL (Walaghat), TN	
Helicia travancorica	Proteaceae	I		KL (Travancore Hills), TN (Tirunelveli Hills)	
Aconitum balfourii var. rhombilobum	Ranunculaceae	I		UK (Garhwal Himalaya; Kumaun)	
Aconitum falconeri var. falconeri	Ranunculaceae	I		Uttar Pradesh (Garhwal; Kumaun)	
Aconitum falconeri var. latilobum	Ranunculaceae	V		HP (Bashahr)	
Aconitum ferox	Ranunculaceae	V		HP, Sikkim, UK	
Aconitum kashmiricum	Ranunculaceae	E		JK	
Aconitum moschatum	Ranunculaceae	I		JK	
Aquilegia nakaoi	Ranunculaceae	I		JK	
Aquilegia nivalis	Ranunculaceae	E		JK (Apharwat)	
Clematis apiculata	Ranunculaceae	E		ML (Khasi hills)	
Clematis bourdillonii	Ranunculaceae	V		KL	
Clematis theobromina	Ranunculaceae	R		TN	
Coptis teeta	Ranunculaceae	E	Endangered	AR	
Delphinium koelzii	Ranunculaceae	I		HP (Kulu)	
Delphinium roylei	Ranunculaceae	I		HP, JK	
Isopyrum ludlowii	Ranunculaceae	I		JK (Lidar Valley, nr Pahlgam)	
Pulsatilla wallichiana	Ranunculaceae	I		HP, JK	
Thalictrum dalzellii	Ranunculaceae	I		KA, MH	
Trollius acaulis	Ranunculaceae	E		JK (Mahdev, Gumri)	
Ziziphus horrida	Rhamnaceae	I		AP (Kurnool), KA (Mysore)	
Ziziphus truncata	Rhamnaceae	I		RJ (west)	
Alchemilla cashmiriana	Rosaceae	I		(West Himalaya)	
Cotoneaster buxifolius	Rosaceae	V		TN	
Cotoneaster cashmirensis	Rosaceae	I		JK	
Cotoneaster simonsii	Rosaceae	I		Sikkim	
Potentilla kashmirica	Rosaceae	I		JK	
Rubus almorensis	Rosaceae	I		UK	
Rubus fockei	Rosaceae	I		KA, KL (Attapadi Hills), TN	
Rubus wightii	Rosaceae	I		TN (Sivagiri Hills, Tirunelveli)	
Spiraea diversifolia	Rosaceae	I		Uttar Pradesh	
Acranthera grandiflora	Rubiaceae	E		TN (Tirunelveli)	
Acranthera tomentosa	Rubiaceae	V		AS, ML, NL	
Argostemma khasianum	Rubiaceae	I		ML	
Byrsophyllum tetrandrum	Rubiaceae	I	Endangered	KL, TN	
Clarkella nana	Rubiaceae	R		UK (western Himalayas)	
Coffea crassifolia	Rubiaceae	I		KL (Travancore Hills), TN	
Diplospora andamanica	Rubiaceae	I		Andaman Is. (Saddle Peak, N. Andamans)	
Galium confertum	Rubiaceae	I		HP	
Hedyotis anamalayana	Rubiaceae	I		TN	
Hedyotis andamanica	Rubiaceae	I		Andaman Is., Nicobar Is. (Nicobar)	
Hedyotis barberi	Rubiaceae	V		TN (Tirunelveli Hills)	
Hedyotis beddomei	Rubiaceae	E		KL (Palghat Hills)	
Hedyotis bourdillonii	Rubiaceae	V		KL (Travancore; Silent Valley)	
Hedyotis brunonis	Rubiaceae	R		AS	
Hedyotis buxifolia	Rubiaceae	R		KL, TN	
Hedyotis congesta var. nicobarica	Rubiaceae	I		Nicobars	
Hedyotis eualata	Rubiaceae	R		TN, KL	
Hedyotis hirsutissima	Rubiaceae	Ex/E		TN	
Hedyotis ramarowii	Rubiaceae	V		KL (Travancore), TN	
Hedyotis shuteri	Rubiaceae	I		TN (east coast near Madras)	
Hedyotis sisaparensis	Rubiaceae	I		TN (Nilgiri Hills)	
Hedyotis stocksii	Rubiaceae	I		KA (Mysore)	
Hedyotis swersioides	Rubiaceae	R		TN, KL	
Hedyotis travancorica	Rubiaceae	I		KL (Travancore Hills), TN (Tirunelveli Hills)	
Hedyotis villosastripulata	Rubiaceae	I		KL (Travancore Hills), TN (Muthukuzhivayal)	
Hedyotis wynaadensis	Rubiaceae	I		KL (Wayanad)	
Indopolysolenia wallichii	Rubiaceae	R		ML	
Ixora andamanica	Rubiaceae	I		Andaman Is.	
Ixora capituliflora	Rubiaceae	I		Andaman Is.	
Ixora cuneifolia var. macrocarpa	Rubiaceae	I		Nicobar Is. (Pulu Milo Is.)	
Ixora hymenophylla	Rubiaceae	I		Andaman Is.	
Ixora johnsonii	Rubiaceae	I	Critically endangered	KL (Travancore)	
Ixora lawsoni	Rubiaceae	I	Endangered	KA (Coorg), KL (Mannthody)	
Ixora longibracteata	Rubiaceae	I		Nicobar Is.	
Ixora saulierei	Rubiaceae	I	Endangered	TN (Palani Hills)	
Ixora tenuifolia	Rubiaceae	I		Nicobar Is.	
Knoxia linearis	Rubiaceae	R		OR (Mahendragiri, Ganjam)	
Lasianthus blumeanus	Rubiaceae	I		TN (Tirunelveli District)	
Lasianthus capitulatus	Rubiaceae	I		KA (Brahmagiri Hills), TN (Nilgiri & Palani Hills)	
Lasianthus ciliatus	Rubiaceae	I	Vulnerable	TN (Nilgiri Hills)	
Lasianthus dichotomus	Rubiaceae	I		TN	
Lasianthus oblongifolius	Rubiaceae	I		TN (Papasam Hills)	
Lasianthus obovatus	Rubiaceae	I		KL (Athramalai Hills)	
Lasianthus truncatus	Rubiaceae	I		AP (Vizakapatam), OR (Mahendragiri Hills, Ganjam)	
Leptodermis griffithii	Rubiaceae	I		ML	
Leptodermis scabrida	Rubiaceae	I		AR (Mishmee Hills)	
Morinda reticulata	Rubiaceae	I		KL (Travancore Hills)	
Mycetia mukerjiana	Rubiaceae	I		AS (Makum hills)	
Nauclea gageana	Rubiaceae	I	Critically endangered	Andaman Is.	
Neanotis carnosa	Rubiaceae	I		KA	
Neanotis monosperma	Rubiaceae	I		KA (Mysore), TN (Nilgiri & Palani Hills)	
Neanotis montholonii	Rubiaceae	I		KA (Mysore and Konkan), KL	
Neanotis oxyphylla	Rubiaceae	R		ML	
Neanotis prainiana	Rubiaceae	V		KA	
Neanotis rheedii	Rubiaceae	I		KA, KL, TN	
Ochreinauclea missionis	Rubiaceae	V	Vulnerable	central and southern W. Ghats	
Oldenlandia albonervia	Rubiaceae	I		KL (Travancore Hills), TN (Tirunelveli Hills)	
Oldenlandia glauca	Rubiaceae	I		RJ (Mt Abu)	
Ophiorrhiza barnesii	Rubiaceae	Ex/E		KL (Travancore)	
Ophiorrhiza brunonis	Rubiaceae	Ex		KA, KL, TN	
Ophiorrhiza caudata	Rubiaceae	Ex		KL (Idukki)	
Ophiorrhiza codyensis	Rubiaceae	I		KA (Coorg, Sampaji Ghat)	
Ophiorrhiza gracilis	Rubiaceae	I		NL (Kohima)	
Ophiorrhiza griffithii	Rubiaceae	I		NL	
Ophiorrhiza hispida	Rubiaceae	E		AS, ML	
Ophiorrhiza incarnata	Rubiaceae	E		KL	
Ophiorrhiza munnarensis	Rubiaceae	I		KL (Idukki)	
Ophiorrhiza nicobarica	Rubiaceae	I		Nicobar Is. (Gt. Nicobar Is.)	
Ophiorrhiza pykarensis	Rubiaceae	Ex/E		TN (Pykara Falls, Nilgiris)	
Ophiorrhiza radicans	Rubiaceae	Ex		KL	
Ophiorrhiza roxburghiana	Rubiaceae	I		TN (Palani Hills; Periya shola)	
Ophiorrhiza subcapitata	Rubiaceae	E		ML (Khasi & Jaintea hills)	
Ophiorrhiza tingens	Rubiaceae	V		AS, ML, NL, Tripura	
Ophiorrhiza wattii	Rubiaceae	E		MN, ML, NL	
Pavetta concinna	Rubiaceae	I		TN (Tirunelveli District)	
Pavetta hohenackeri	Rubiaceae	V		TN (Sispara & Nilgiri Hills)	
Pavetta madrassica	Rubiaceae	R		AP, TN	
Pavetta nemoralis	Rubiaceae	I		KL (Kavalai, Cochin)	
Pavetta oblanceolata	Rubiaceae	I		KL	
Pavetta wightii	Rubiaceae	Ex/E		TN	
Plectronia ficiformis	Rubiaceae	I		KA (Mysore), TN (Palani & Sivagiri Hills)	
Plectronia pergracilis	Rubiaceae	I		KL (Colatoorpolay, Travancore)	
Prismatomeris andamanica	Rubiaceae	I	Critically endangered	Andaman Is. (S. Andaman Is.)	
Psychotria aborensis	Rubiaceae	E		AR	
Psychotria andamanica	Rubiaceae	R		Andaman Is., Nicobar Is.	
Psychotria barberi	Rubiaceae	I		KL (Travancore Hills) TN	
Psychotria globicephala	Rubiaceae	E	Endangered	TN (Tirunelveli District)	
Psychotria helferi var. angustifolia	Rubiaceae	I		Andaman Is. (S. Andaman Is.)	
Psychotria nicobarica	Rubiaceae	I		Nicobar Is. (Katchal Is.)	
Psychotria pendula	Rubiaceae	I		S. Andaman Is.	
Psychotria polyneura var. longipetiolate	Rubiaceae	I		Andaman Is.	
Psychotria tylophora	Rubiaceae	Ex/E		Nicobar Is.	
Pubistylus andamanensis	Rubiaceae	I		Andaman Is.	
Rubia edgeworthii	Rubiaceae	V		(Western Himalayas)	
Rubia himalayensis	Rubiaceae	V		JK	
Saprosma fragrans	Rubiaceae	I	Vulnerable	KL (Malabar), TN	
Tarenna agumbensis	Rubiaceae	V	Endangered	KA	
Urophyllum andamanicum	Rubiaceae	I		Andaman Is. (S. Andamans)	
Wendlandia andamanica	Rubiaceae	E	Critically endangered	Andaman Is. (Port Blair, Andaman Is.)	
Wendlandia angustifolia	Rubiaceae	E	Extinct	TN (Courtallum & Tirunelveli)	Rediscovered in 2000
Wendlandia lawii	Rubiaceae	I		KA (Mysore)	
Atalantia missionis	Rutaceae	I		AP (Cuddapah), KL, TN	
Glycosmis macrocarpa	Rutaceae	R		KL, TN	
Melicope indica	Rutaceae	V	Endangered	TN	
Sabia malabarica	Sabiaceae	I		KL (Palghat), TN	
Allophylus concanicus	Sapindaceae	R		MH	
Isonandra villosa	Sapotaceae	I	Endangered	KL, TN	
Madhuca bourdillonii	Sapotaceae	Ex/E	Endangered	KL (Travancore)	
Madhuca diplostemon	Sapotaceae	E	Endangered	India	
Madhuca insignis	Sapotaceae	Ex/E	Critically endangered	KA	
Mimusops andamanensis	Sapotaceae	I		Andaman Is.	
Saxifraga jacquemontiana	Saxifragaceae	E		JK (Damamsar)	
Schisandra grandiflora	Schisandraceae	I		HP, ML, Sikkim, UK	
Schisandra propinqua	Schisandraceae	I		Sikkim, UK	
Adenosma malabaricum	Scrophulariaceae	I		KL (Malabar coast)	
Anticharis glandulosa var. caerulea	Scrophulariaceae	I		RJ (Jaisalmer)	
Bonnaya bracteoides	Scrophulariaceae	I		RJ (Mt Abu)	
Campylanthus ramosissimus	Scrophulariaceae	R		GJ (Kutch)	
Christisonia saulieri	Scrophulariaceae	I		TN	
Christisonia subacaulis	Scrophulariaceae	I		TN (Tirunelveli Hills)	
Veronica anagallis var. bracteosa	Scrophulariaceae	I		RJ (Mt Abu, Sirohu District)	
Veronica anagallis-aquatica var. bracteata	Scrophulariaceae	I		RJ	
Veronica beccabunga var. attenuata	Scrophulariaceae	I		RJ	
Pauia belladonna	Solanaceae	R		AR (Tirap)	
Solanum kurzii	Solanaceae	I		TN (Coimbatore Hills)	
Eriolaena lushingtonii	Malvaceae	V	Vulnerable	AP, TN	
Hildegardia populifolia	Malvaceae	E	Critically endangered	AP, TN	
Melhania futteyporensis var. major	Malvaceae	I		RJ (western)	
Melhania magnifolia	Malvaceae	I		RJ (western)	
Pterospermum reticulatum	Malvaceae	R	Vulnerable	KA, KL, TN	
Sterculia khasiana	Malvaceae	Ex	Extinct	ML (Khasi hills)	
Sterculia populnifolia	Malvaceae	I			
Symplocos anamallayana	Symplocaceae	R	Endangered	TN 1	
Symplocos barberi	Symplocaceae	I	Endangered	TN (Tirunelveli Hills)	
Symplocos villosa	Symplocaceae	I		KL (Peermade Hills, Travancore)	
Adinandra griffithii	Pentaphylacaceae	E	Endangered	ML (Khasi hills)	
Cleyera japonica var. grandiflora	Pentaphylacaceae	R	Endangered	ML	
Pyrenaria khasiana	Theaceae	I	Data deficient	ML	
Erinocarpus nimmonii	Malvaceae	R		KA, MH	
Ulmus wallichiana	Ulmaceae	E	Vulnerable	JK	
Acronema pseudotenera	Umbelliferae	I		Sikkim (Momay Samdong)	
Angelica nubigena	Umbelliferae	I		Sikkim (N.E at Chola and Yakla passes)	
Carum villosum	Umbelliferae	Ex/E		BR (Ramgar, North Champaran)	
Chaerophyllum orientalis	Umbelliferae	I		AR (Naga hills)	
Heracleum aquilegifolium	Umbelliferae	I		KA (Konkan), TN	
Heracleum jacquemontii	Umbelliferae	I		(NW Himalaya)	
Hydrocotyle conferta	Umbelliferae	R	Endangered	TN (Nilgiri and Pulney mountains)	
Ligusticum albo-alatum	Umbelliferae	Ex/E		BR (Samripat; Ranchi District), OR (Sarguja, Raigarh District)	
Peucedanum anamallayense	Umbelliferae	R		TN (Coimbatore)	
Pimpinella evoluta	Umbelliferae	Ex/E		NL (Jakpho, Naga hills)	
Pimpinella flaccida	Umbelliferae	I		NL (Kohima)	
Pimpinella katrajensis	Umbelliferae	R		MH	
Pimpinella pulneyensis	Umbelliferae	Ex/E		TN (Palani Hills, Madurai Dist)	
Pimpinella tirupatiensis	Umbelliferae	E	Endangered	AP	
Pimpinella tongloensis	Umbelliferae	Ex/E		AS (Singaleela Range), Sikkim (Singaleela Range)	
Polyzygus tuberosus	Umbelliferae	R		KA, MH	
Pternopetalum radiatum	Umbelliferae	I		Sikkim	
Schultzia benthami	Umbelliferae	I		KA (Kanara coast)	
Boehmeria tirapensis	Urticaceae	I		AR (Tirap District)	
Valeriana beddomei	Valerianaceae	I		TN	
Clerodendrum lankawiense var. andamanense	Verbenaceae	I		Andaman Is. (S. Andaman Is.)	
Premna paucinervis	Verbenaceae	I		TN (Coimbatore)	
Vitex wimberleyii	Verbenaceae	I		Andaman Is. (S. Andaman Is.)	
Hybanthus travancoricus	Violaceae	I		KL, TN	
Viola himalayensis	Violaceae	I		JK	
Viola kunawarensis	Violaceae	I		NW Himalaya	
Ginalloa andamanica	Viscaceae	E		Andaman Is. (South)	
Viscum mysorense	Viscaceae	I		KA	
Ampelocissus arnottiana	Vitaceae	I		KA (South Kanara), KL, TN	
Ampelocissus eriocladus	Vitaceae	I		TN (Tirunelveli Hills)	
Cayratia pedata var. glabra	Vitaceae	R	Critically endangered	TN (Nilgiris)	
Cayratia roxburghii	Vitaceae	V		KL (Trivandrum & Quilon Dist.) TN (Tirunelveli District)	
Cissus spectabilis	Vitaceae	E		Sikkim, Darjeeling	
Tetrastigma andamanicum	Vitaceae	I		Andaman Is.	

== Liliopsida ==
Species	Family	BSI status	IUCN status	Region	Notes
Wiesneria triandra	Alismataceae	R	Least concern	Goa, Daman & Diu, KA, KL (nr Parappangadi; Kottur), MH	
Allium auriculatum	Alliaceae	E		HP, JK	
Allium loratum	Alliaceae	E		JK	
Allium roylei	Alliaceae	E	Near threatened	JK	
Allium stracheyi	Alliaceae	V		JK, UK	
Crinum eleonorae	Amaryllidaceae	R		MH (Lingmala, Mahabaleshwar)	
Crinum malabaricum	Amaryllidaceae	E	Critically endangered	KL	Described in 2012 with very restricted distribution
Crinum pusillum	Amaryllidaceae	I		Nicobar Is.	
Crinum woodrowii	Amaryllidaceae			MH (Mahabaleshwar)	Rediscovered in 2004
Pancratium parvum	Amaryllidaceae	I		KA	
Chlorophytum borivilianum	Asparagaceae	R	Critically endangered	GJ, MH	
Chlorophytum glaucum	Asparagaceae	I		KA	
Chlorophytum malabaricum	Asparagaceae	I		(south WG)	
Aponogeton appendiculatus	Aponogetonaceae	I	Data deficient	KL, TN	
Aponogeton satarensis	Aponogetonaceae	V	Endangered	MH (Satara District)	
Aglaonema nicobaricum	Araceae	I		Nicobar Is.	
Alocasia montana	Araceae	I		AP (north Circars)	
Amorphophallus carnosus	Araceae	I		Andaman Is.	
Amorphophallus dubius	Araceae	I		KL (Malabar)	
Amorphophallus hohenackeri	Araceae	I		KA (nr Mangalore, South Canara)	
Amorphophallus longistylus	Araceae	R		Andaman Is.	
Amorphophallus oncophyllus	Araceae	R		Andaman Is.	
Anaphyllum beddomei	Araceae	R		TN	
Anaphyllum weightii	Araceae	I		KL, TN	
Arisaema attenuatum	Araceae	I		India	
Arisaema auriculata	Araceae	I		Nilambur Ghats	
Arisaema barnesii	Araceae	I		KA, TN	
Arisaema murrayi	Araceae	I		KA (Konkan), TN (Nilgiris)	
Arisaema psittacus	Araceae	I		KL (Travancore Hills)	
Arisaema pulcherum	Araceae	I		TN (Sispara, Nilgiri Hills)	
Arisaema sarracenioides	Araceae	I		(imakad gap and Munr-Devicolam)	
Arisaema translucens	Araceae	I		TN (Nilgiri Hills)	
Arisaema tuberculatum	Araceae	I		TN (Nilgiri Hills)	
Arisaema tylophorum	Araceae	I		TN (Nilgiri Hills)	
Arisaema wightii	Araceae	I		TN (Nilgiri Hills)	
Cryptocoryne cognata	Araceae	I	Endangered	KA (Konkan)	
Cryptocoryne cognatoides	Araceae	V		KA (North Kanara), MH	
Cryptocoryne consobrina	Araceae	I	Near threatened	(WG)	
Cryptocoryne tortuosa	Araceae	E		MH (Mahabaleshwar, Satara)	
Cryptocoryne wightii	Araceae	I		KA (Mysore), KL	
Lagenandra meeboldii	Araceae	I		KA (Agalhatti, Mysore), KL (Tuppad)	
Lagenandra undulata	Araceae	I		AR (Subansiri)	
Pothos armatus	Araceae	I		KA (Tambracheri Ghat, Malabar)	
Pothos thomsonianus	Araceae	I		KA (Carnatic), KL (Travancore Hills)	
Theriophonum dalzellii	Araceae	R		KA, MH	
Theriophonum fischeri	Araceae	I		KL (central), TN (south-west)	
Theriophonum sivaganganum	Araceae	V		TN	
Typhonium incurvatum	Araceae	E		MH (Bombay-Sion)	
Arenga wightii	Arecaceae	V	Vulnerable	KA, KL, TN	
Bentinckia condapanna	Arecaceae	R	Vulnerable	KL, TN	
Bentinckia nicobarica	Arecaceae	V	Endangered	Nicobar Is.	
Calamus andamanicus	Arecaceae	V		Andaman Is.	
Calamus brandisii	Arecaceae	I		KA (Kanara), KL, TN	
Calamus dilaceratus	Arecaceae	R		Andaman Is.	
Calamus huegelianus	Arecaceae	R		TN (Nilgiri Hills)	
Calamus inermis	Arecaceae	V		Sikkim, WB	
Calamus nagbettai	Arecaceae	V		KA (Coorg & south Kanara)	
Calamus nicobaricus	Arecaceae	R		Nicobar Is. (Great Nicobar)	
Corypha macropoda	Arecaceae	R	Data deficient	Andaman Is. (south)	
Corypha taliera	Arecaceae	Ex	Extinct in the Wild	(Bengal)	
Corypha umbraculifera	Arecaceae	R	Data deficient	KL (Malabar coast)	
Daemonorops manii	Arecaceae	R		Andaman Is.	
Hyphaene dichotoma	Arecaceae	V	Lower risk/near threatened	GJ, MH	
Korthalsia rogersii	Arecaceae	R		Andaman Is.	Described in 1904 and rediscovered in 2007
Phoenix rupicola	Arecaceae	V	Lower risk/near threatened	AR, ML, Sikkim	
Pinanga andamanensis	Arecaceae	R		Andaman Is.	Rediscovered in 1992.
Pinanga dicksonii	Arecaceae	V		KL (Nilgiri Hills), TN (WG)	
Pinanga manii	Arecaceae	V		Andaman Is. (south), Nicobar Is.	
Rhopaloblaste augusta	Arecaceae	V	Vulnerable	Nicobar Is. (northern group)	
Wallichia triandra	Arecaceae	R	Lower risk/least concern	AR (Haylung, Wakroo, Lohit)	
Asparagus asiaticus	Asparagaceae	I		KA (Bellary)	
Asparagus fysoni	Asparagaceae	I		TN (Nilgiri Hills)	
Asparagus jacquemonti	Asparagaceae	I		MH	
Asparagus rottleri	Asparagaceae	I		(Deccan Peninsula)	
Haplothismia exanulata	Burmanniaceae	I		KL (Travancore; Cochin)	Rediscovered in 2000
Iphigenia magnifica	Colchicaceae	V		KA, MH	
Iphigenia sahyadrica	Colchicaceae	E		KA (Halial, Hulical)	
Iphigenia stellata	Colchicaceae	V	Endangered	MH (Satara & KolhapurDistrict)	
Aneilema ochraceum	Commelinaceae	I		KA, KL (Quilon)	
Belosynapsis kewensis	Commelinaceae	E		TN (Tinnevelly & Kanyakumari)	
Belosynapsis vivipara	Commelinaceae	V		KA, MH, TN	
Commelina hirsuta	Commelinaceae	R		TN (Nilgiri & Pulney Hills)	
Commelina indehiscens	Commelinaceae	R		KA, KL, TN	
Commelina subulata	Commelinaceae	I	Least concern	(Deccan hills)	
Commelina tricolor	Commelinaceae	V		TN (Karadimalais )	
Commelina wightii	Commelinaceae	V		Nilgiri & Pulney Hills	
Cyanotis burmanniana	Commelinaceae	R		KL (Malabar)	
Cyanotis cerifolia	Commelinaceae	I		TN	
Cyanotis vaginata	Commelinaceae	I		KL (Malabar)	
Dictyospermum ovalifolium	Commelinaceae	R		KA, KL (Thenmalai), MH (Konkan)	
Murdannia lanceolata	Commelinaceae	V	Vulnerable	KL, TN	
Murdannia lanuginosa	Commelinaceae	R		India	
Murdannia versicolor	Commelinaceae	I		KA (Konkan)	
Pollia pentasperma	Commelinaceae	I		AS (Lushai hills), ML (Shillong), NL (Kohima, Naga hills)	
Ophiopogon intermedius var. gracilipes	Convallariaceae	I		TN (Nilgiri Hills)	
Peliosanthes courtallensis	Convallariaceae	I		TN	
Polygonatum graminifolium	Convallariaceae	I		(W. Himalaya)	
Smilacina fusca	Convallariaceae	I		ML	
Carex annulata	Cyperaceae	I		JK	
Carex borii	Cyperaceae	I	Least concern	HP, JK	
Carex christii	Cyperaceae	I		TN (Nilgiri Hills)	
Carex fuscifructus	Cyperaceae	I		AS (Makum forests, Lakhimpur)	
Carex kingiana	Cyperaceae	I		Sikkim	
Carex munroi	Cyperaceae	R		HP (Kinur)	
Carex myosurus var. oraestans	Cyperaceae	E		UK	
Carex pseudoaperta	Cyperaceae	I		TN (Nilgiri Hills)	
Carex rara	Cyperaceae	I		AS, ML	
Carex repanda	Cyperaceae	Ex		ML (Cherrapunji; Shillong)	
Carex vicinalis	Cyperaceae	I		TN (Nilgiri Hills)	
Carex wightiana	Cyperaceae	I		KL (Travancore), TN (Courtallum Hills)	
Cyperus kurzii	Cyperaceae	I		Andaman Is.	
Fimbristylis aggregata	Cyperaceae	I		TN	
Fimbristylis arnottiana	Cyperaceae	I		KL (Cannore)	
Fimbristylis contorta	Cyperaceae	I		TN (Courtallum Hills)	
Fimbristylis stolonifera	Cyperaceae	R		MN, MZ (Khasi hills, Mawphlong), ML	
Hypolytrum balakrishnanii	Cyperaceae	I		Andaman Is. (South)	
Kobresia duthiei	Cyperaceae	I		HP, UK	
Kobresia trinervis var. foliosa	Cyperaceae	I		UK	
Rhynchospora submarginata	Cyperaceae	I		KL	
Scleria alta	Cyperaceae	E		AS, ML, WB	
Scleria bracteata var. assamica	Cyperaceae	E		AS	
Dioscorea belophylla	Dioscoreaceae	I		WG	
Dioscorea kalkapershadii	Dioscoreaceae	I		TN (Shevaroy Hills, Salem Dist)	
Dioscorea oppositifolia var. dukhunensis	Dioscoreaceae	I			
Dioscorea rogersii	Dioscoreaceae	I		Andaman Is.	
Dioscorea vexans	Dioscoreaceae	I		Andaman Is.	
Dioscorea wightii	Dioscoreaceae	I	Data deficient	KL (Travancore Hills), TN (Courtallum, Tirunelveli H.)	
Eriocaulon barba-carpae	Eriocaulaceae	Ex/E		KA, ML	
Eriocaulon barbeyanum	Eriocaulaceae	Ex/E	Near threatened	KA	
Eriocaulon dalzellii	Eriocaulaceae	I	Endangered	KA (south Konkan)	
Eriocaulon europeplon	Eriocaulaceae	E		GJ, MH	
Eriocaulon gamblei	Eriocaulaceae	R		TN (duvattam, Nilgiri)	
Eriocaulon geoffreyi	Eriocaulaceae	R		TN	
Eriocaulon gregatum	Eriocaulaceae	R	Near threatened	ML	
Eriocaulon humile	Eriocaulaceae	V		MH (WG)	
Eriocaulon margaretae	Eriocaulaceae	I	Least concern	KA (Rudrasiri, Mysore)	
Eriocaulon mysorense	Eriocaulaceae	R		KA	
Eriocaulon pectinatum	Eriocaulaceae	E	Vulnerable	TN (Nilgiri Hills)	
Eriocaulon pumilo	Eriocaulaceae	I		UP	
Eriocaulon thomasi	Eriocaulaceae	R		KA, MH	
Dipcadi concanense	Hyacinthaceae	Ex		(south)	
Dipcadi maharashtrensis	Hyacinthaceae	E		MH (Panchgani plateau)	
Dipcadi minor	Hyacinthaceae	I		MH (Deccan Plateau)	
Dipcadi montanum var. madrasicum	Hyacinthaceae	I		TN	
Dipcadi reidii	Hyacinthaceae	E		(W. Himalaya)	Rediscovered in 2014.
Dipcadi saxorum	Hyacinthaceae	V		MH (Boriveli NP)	
Drimia razii	Hyacinthaceae	R		MH	
Scilla viridis	Hyacinthaceae	E		MH	
Urginea polyphylla	Hyacinthaceae	Ex		(Deccan Plateau)	
Hydrilla polysperma	Hydrocharitaceae	I		RJ (Mt Abu)	
Iris duthiei	Iridaceae	I		Kumaun	
Iris milesii	Iridaceae	I		HP	
Juncus sikkimensis	Juncaceae	R		Sikkim	
Microschoenus duthiei	Juncaceae	I		UK, UP	
Lemna maxima	Lemnaceae	I		RJ (Mt Abu)	
Lemna minima	Lemnaceae	I		RJ (Mt Abu)	
Lilium mackliniae	Liliaceae	E		MN (Shirhoy Hill)	
Lilium neilgherrense	Liliaceae	I		KA, TN	
Lilium wallichianum	Liliaceae	I		Uttar Pradesh (Chamoli Dist. Kumaun)	
Lloydia himalensis	Liliaceae	R		HP, JK, Sikkim	
Phrynium cadellianum	Marantaceae	I		Andaman Is.	
Phrynium paniculatum	Marantaceae	I		Nicobar Is. (Gt. Nicobar Is.)	
Stachyphrynium spicatum	Marantaceae	I	Least concern	KA, KL	
Aloe trinervis	Asphodelaceae		Endangered		
Alpinia malaccensis	Zingiberaceae		Data deficient		
Alpinia manii	Zingiberaceae		Vulnerable		
Alpinia mutica	Zingiberaceae		Least concern		
Alpinia nigra	Zingiberaceae		Least concern		
Abildgaardia ovata, syn. Fimbristylis ovata	Cyperaceae		Least concern		
Amomum dealbatum	Zingiberaceae		Data deficient		
Amomum maximum	Zingiberaceae		Least concern		
Amomum pterocarpum	Zingiberaceae		Least concern		
Amomum riwatchii	Zingiberaceae		Critically endangered		
Amomum sericeum	Zingiberaceae		Data deficient		
Amomum subulatum	Zingiberaceae		Data deficient		
Amorphophallus paeoniifolius	Araceae		Least concern		
Anthoxanthum borii	Poaceae		Near threatened		
Aponogeton bruggenii	Aponogetonaceae		Vulnerable		
Asparagus filicinus	Asparagaceae		Data deficient		
Boesenbergia siphonantha	Zingiberaceae		Vulnerable		
Brachycorythis wightii	Orchidaceae		Data deficient		
Carex kashmirensis	Cyperaceae		Near threatened		
Carex walkeri	Cyperaceae		Near threatened		
Curcuma aurantiaca	Zingiberaceae		Data deficient		
Curcuma bhatii	Zingiberaceae		Critically endangered		
Curcuma caulina	Zingiberaceae		Endangered		
Curcuma coriacea	Zingiberaceae		Endangered		
Curcuma haritha	Zingiberaceae		Least concern		
Curcuma inodora	Zingiberaceae		Least concern		
Curcuma longa	Zingiberaceae		Data deficient		
Curcuma mangga	Zingiberaceae		Data deficient		
Curcuma pseudomontana	Zingiberaceae		Vulnerable		
Curcuma roscoeana	Zingiberaceae		Least concern		
Curcuma vamana	Zingiberaceae		Critically endangered		
Curcuma zanthorrhiza	Zingiberaceae		Data deficient		
Curcuma zedoaria	Zingiberaceae		Data deficient		
Cypripedium cordigerum	Orchidaceae		Vulnerable		
Cypripedium elegans	Orchidaceae		Endangered		
Cypripedium himalaicum	Orchidaceae		Endangered		
Cypripedium tibeticum	Orchidaceae		Least concern		
Dendrobium aphyllum	Orchidaceae		Least concern		
Dendrobium bensoniae	Orchidaceae		Least concern		
Dendrocalamus giganteus	Poaceae		Least concern		
Desmostachya bipinnata	Poaceae		Least concern		
Digitaria duthieana	Poaceae		Data deficient		
Dimeria hohenackeri	Poaceae		Endangered		
Dimeria ornithopoda	Poaceae		Least concern		
Dioscorea hamiltonii	Dioscoreaceae		Near threatened		
Dioscorea nummularia	Dioscoreaceae		Near threatened		
Eleocharis swamyi	Cyperaceae		Data deficient		
Eleocharis wadoodii	Cyperaceae		Data deficient		
Eriocaulon anshiense	Eriocaulaceae		Endangered		
Eriocaulon apetalum	Eriocaulaceae		Least concern		
Eriocaulon balakrishnanii	Eriocaulaceae		Least concern		
Eriocaulon baramaticum	Eriocaulaceae		Data deficient		
Eriocaulon bolei	Eriocaulaceae		Critically endangered		
Eriocaulon karnatakense	Eriocaulaceae		Vulnerable		
Eriocaulon kolhapurense	Eriocaulaceae		Vulnerable		
Eriocaulon konkanense	Eriocaulaceae		Vulnerable		
Eriocaulon koynense	Eriocaulaceae		Data deficient		
Eriocaulon lanceolatum	Eriocaulaceae		Least concern		
Eriocaulon leucomelas	Eriocaulaceae		Least concern		
Eriocaulon longicuspe	Eriocaulaceae		Least concern		
Eriocaulon maharashtrense	Eriocaulaceae		Vulnerable		
Eriocaulon ratnagiricum	Eriocaulaceae		Critically endangered		
Eriocaulon richardianum	Eriocaulaceae		Endangered		
Eriocaulon ritchieanum	Eriocaulaceae		Least concern		
Eriocaulon robustobrownianum	Eriocaulaceae		Least concern		
Eriocaulon robustum	Eriocaulaceae		Least concern		
Eriocaulon rouxianum	Eriocaulaceae		Critically endangered		
Eriocaulon sahyadricum	Eriocaulaceae		Least concern		
Eriocaulon santapaui	Eriocaulaceae		Critically endangered		
Eriocaulon sedgwickii	Eriocaulaceae		Least concern		
Eriocaulon setaceum	Eriocaulaceae		Least concern		
Eriocaulon sharmae	Eriocaulaceae		Critically endangered		
Eriocaulon sivarajanii	Eriocaulaceae		Critically endangered		
Eriocaulon stellulatum	Eriocaulaceae		Least concern		
Eriocaulon talbotii	Eriocaulaceae		Least concern		
Eriocaulon thwaitesii	Eriocaulaceae		Least concern		
Eriocaulon truncatum	Eriocaulaceae		Least concern		
Eriocaulon tuberiferum	Eriocaulaceae		Vulnerable		
Eriocaulon wightianum	Eriocaulaceae		Least concern		
Eriocaulon xeranthemum	Eriocaulaceae		Least concern		
Eriochloa procera	Poaceae		Least concern		
Erythrorchis altissima	Orchidaceae		Least concern		
Etlingera fenzlii	Zingiberaceae		Vulnerable		
Fimbristylis crystallina	Cyperaceae		Endangered		
Fimbristylis dauciformis	Cyperaceae		Endangered		
Fimbristylis dichotoma	Cyperaceae		Least concern		
Fimbristylis dipsacea	Cyperaceae		Least concern		
Fimbristylis ferruginea	Cyperaceae		Least concern		
Fimbristylis hirsutifolia	Cyperaceae		Critically endangered		
Fimbristylis kingii	Cyperaceae		Least concern		
Fimbristylis lawiana	Cyperaceae		Least concern		
Fimbristylis littoralis	Cyperaceae		Least concern		
Fimbristylis merrillii	Cyperaceae		Least concern		
Fimbristylis microcarya	Cyperaceae		Least concern		
Fimbristylis monospicula	Cyperaceae		Data deficient		
Fimbristylis nutans	Cyperaceae		Least concern		
Fimbristylis polytrichoides	Cyperaceae		Least concern		
Fimbristylis pubisquama	Cyperaceae		Least concern		
Fimbristylis quinquangularis	Cyperaceae		Least concern		
Fimbristylis salbundia	Cyperaceae		Least concern		
Fimbristylis schoenoides	Cyperaceae		Least concern		
Fimbristylis squarrosa	Cyperaceae		Least concern		
Fimbristylis tetragona	Cyperaceae		Least concern		
Fimbristylis turkestanica	Cyperaceae		Least concern		
Floscopa scandens	Commelinaceae		Least concern		
Fuirena ciliaris	Cyperaceae		Least concern		
Fuirena cuspidata	Cyperaceae		Least concern		
Fuirena pubescens	Cyperaceae		Least concern		
Fuirena swamyi	Cyperaceae		Vulnerable		
Fuirena trilobites	Cyperaceae		Least concern		
Fuirena tuwensis	Cyperaceae		Least concern		
Fuirena umbellata	Cyperaceae		Least concern		
Fuirena uncinata	Cyperaceae		Least concern		
Gagea kunawurensis	Liliaceae		Least concern		
Garnotia courtallensis	Poaceae		Least concern		
Geodorum recurvum	Orchidaceae		Least concern		
Globba andersonii	Zingiberaceae		Endangered		
Globba marantina	Zingiberaceae		Least concern		
Globba multiflora	Zingiberaceae		Least concern		
Globba orixensis	Zingiberaceae		Least concern		
Globba pendula	Zingiberaceae		Least concern		
Globba racemosa	Zingiberaceae		Least concern		
Globba radicalis	Zingiberaceae		Endangered		
Globba spathulata	Zingiberaceae		Vulnerable		
Globba wardii	Zingiberaceae		Near threatened		
Globba wengeri	Zingiberaceae		Data deficient		
Habenaria dichopetala	Orchidaceae		Endangered		
Halophila beccarii	Hydrocharitaceae		Vulnerable		
Hedychium aureum	Zingiberaceae		Endangered		
Hedychium coronarium	Zingiberaceae		Data deficient		
Isachne bicolor	Poaceae		Vulnerable		
Isachne meeboldii	Poaceae		Critically endangered		
Isachne pulchella	Poaceae		Least concern		
Isachne swaminathanii	Poaceae		Endangered		
Isachne veldkampii	Poaceae		Critically endangered		
Ischaemum jayachandranii	Poaceae		Critically endangered		
Ischaemum molle	Poaceae		Least concern		
Ischaemum muticum	Poaceae		Least concern		
Ischaemum travancorense	Poaceae		Least concern		
Ischaemum vembanadense	Poaceae		Endangered		
Kaempferia galanga	Zingiberaceae		Data deficient		
Kaempferia parviflora	Zingiberaceae		Data deficient		
Kyllinga brevifolia	Cyperaceae		Least concern		
Kyllinga pluristaminea	Cyperaceae		Endangered		
Larsenianthus arunachalensis	Zingiberaceae		Critically endangered		
Lilium polyphyllum	Liliaceae		Critically endangered		
Limnophyton obtusifolium	Alismataceae		Least concern		
Lipocarpha raynaleana	Cyperaceae		Data deficient		
Lipocarpha reddyi	Cyperaceae		Data deficient		
Luisia volucris	Orchidaceae		Vulnerable		
Malaxis muscifera	Orchidaceae		Vulnerable		
Meistera aculeata	Zingiberaceae		Least concern		
Musa argentii	Musaceae		Critically endangered		
Musa arunachalensis	Musaceae		Critically endangered		
Musa chunii	Musaceae		Endangered		
Musa coccinea	Musaceae		Endangered		
Musa cylindrica	Musaceae		Endangered		
Oryza coarctata	Poaceae		Data deficient		
Oryza malampuzhaensis	Poaceae		Vulnerable		
Oryza meyeriana	Poaceae		Least concern		
Oryza meyeriana var. granulata	Poaceae		Least concern		
Oryza meyeriana var. inandamanica	Poaceae		Data deficient		
Paphiopedilum appletonianum	Orchidaceae		Endangered		
Paphiopedilum charlesworthii	Orchidaceae		Endangered		
Paphiopedilum insigne	Orchidaceae		Endangered		
Paphiopedilum spicerianum	Orchidaceae		Endangered		
Paphiopedilum venustum	Orchidaceae		Endangered		
Paphiopedilum villosum	Orchidaceae		Vulnerable		
Parakaempferia synantha	Zingiberaceae		Critically endangered		
Phoenix paludosa	Arecaceae		Near threatened		
Plagiostachys nicobarica	Zingiberaceae		Endangered		
Ranalisma rostrata	Alismataceae		Data deficient		
Scirpus naikianus	Cyperaceae		Data deficient		
Scleria poklei	Cyperaceae		Data deficient		
Vanda spathulata	Orchidaceae		Vulnerable		
Wurfbainia villosa var. xanthioides	Zingiberaceae		Data deficient		
Xyris capensis	Xyridaceae		Least concern		
Zingiber arunachalensis	Zingiberaceae		Critically endangered		
Zingiber ligulatum	Zingiberaceae		Data deficient		
Zingiber montanum	Zingiberaceae		Data deficient		
Zingiber officinale	Zingiberaceae		Data deficient		
Zingiber spectabile	Zingiberaceae		Data deficient		
Zingiber zerumbet	Zingiberaceae		Data deficient		
Aerides fieldingii	Orchidaceae	I		AS, ML (Khasi hills), Sikkim	
Aerides vandara	Orchidaceae	I		AS, ML, NL	
Anoectochilus nicobaricus	Orchidaceae	E		Nicobar Is. (Great Nicobar)	
Anoectochilus rotundifolius	Orchidaceae	Ex/E		TN (High Wavy Mts, Madura)	
Anoectochilus sikkimensis	Orchidaceae	I		Sikkim	
Anoectochilus tetrapterus	Orchidaceae	V		MN	
Aphyllorchis gollani	Orchidaceae	Ex/E		Tehri-Garhwal	
Aphyllorchis vaginata	Orchidaceae	I		ML (Khasi hills)	
Arachnis clarkei	Orchidaceae	I		AR, ML, Sikkim	
Archineottia microglottis	Orchidaceae	R		UK	
Biermannia jainiana	Orchidaceae	I		AR	
Bulbophyllum acutiflorum	Orchidaceae	R		TN	
Bulbophyllum albidum	Orchidaceae	R		TN	
Bulbophyllum aureum	Orchidaceae	R		KL (Muthukuzhivayal, Wayanad)	
Bulbophyllum elegantulum	Orchidaceae	V		KA (Coorg), TN (Kudini, Nilgiri hills)	
Bulbophyllum fusco-purpureum	Orchidaceae	I		TN (Nilagiri Hills)	
Bulbophyllum kaitiense	Orchidaceae	V		TN (Nilgiris)	
Bulbophyllum mysorense	Orchidaceae	I		TN	
Bulbophyllum raui	Orchidaceae	I		Uttar Pradesh (Kumaun)	
Bulbophyllum rothschildianum	Orchidaceae	E		NE India	
Bulleyia yunnanensis	Orchidaceae	I		AR, Darjeeling	
Calanthe alismaefolia	Orchidaceae	I		AR, Jhasi Hills, Mussoorie	
Calanthe alpina	Orchidaceae	R		Sikkim, UK	
Calanthe herbacea	Orchidaceae	I		Sikkim	
Calanthe whiteana	Orchidaceae	Ex		Sikkim (Choongthang)	
Chrysoglossum hallbergii	Orchidaceae	I		TN (High Wavy Mts, Madura)	
Cirrhopetalum acutiflorum	Orchidaceae	I		TN (Nilgiri Hills)	
Coelogyne angustifolia	Orchidaceae	I		TN (Nilgiri Hills)	
Coelogyne barbata	Orchidaceae	I		ML (Khasi hills), Sikkim	
Coelogyne cristata	Orchidaceae	I		AS, Khasi Hills, Sikkim	
Coelogyne flaccida	Orchidaceae	I		ML (Khasi & Jaintia hills)	
Coelogyne mossiae	Orchidaceae	V		KL (Idukki), TN	
Coelogyne nitida	Orchidaceae	I		AS, Khasi Hills, Sikkim	
Coelogyne prolifera	Orchidaceae	I		AS, Khasi Hills, NL	
Coelogyne treutleri	Orchidaceae	Ex/E		Sikkim (Sikkim Himalaya)	
Cymbidium whiteae	Orchidaceae	E		Sikkim	
Dendrobium arachnites	Orchidaceae	R		India	
Dendrobium gamblei	Orchidaceae	I		Dehra Dun	
Dendrobium microbulbon	Orchidaceae	I		GJ, MH, TN	
Dendrobium normale	Orchidaceae	I		Uttar Pradesh	
Dendrobium pauciflorum	Orchidaceae	E		Sikkim, Darjeeling	
Dendrobium pensile	Orchidaceae	I		Great Nicobar	
Dendrobium tenuicaule	Orchidaceae	E		Middle Andamans	
Didiciea cunninghamii	Orchidaceae	E		Sikkim (Lachen Valley), Garhwal	
Diglyphosa macrophylla	Orchidaceae	I		Sikkim	
Diplomeris pulchella	Orchidaceae	V		AR (Mdapha FoR, Tirap Dist.), Khasi, Garo Hills	
Disperis monophylla	Orchidaceae	I		TN (High Wavy Mtns, Madurai)	
Epipogium sessanum	Orchidaceae	I		AR	
Eria albiflora	Orchidaceae	R		TN (WG)	
Eria occidentalis	Orchidaceae	R		Kumaun	
Eulophia candida	Orchidaceae	I		AS, Sikkim	
Eulophia cullenii	Orchidaceae	I		KL (Travancore Hills), TN	
Eulophia mackinnonii	Orchidaceae	R		MP, UK	
Eulophia nicobarica	Orchidaceae	E		Nicobar Is.	
Eulophia obtusa	Orchidaceae	I		Uttar Pradesh	
Eulophia ramentacea	Orchidaceae	I		(WG;Â ? Deccan P.), GJ, KA	
Flickingeria hesperis	Orchidaceae	E		UK (Askot; Kumaun)	
Galeola cathcartii	Orchidaceae	I		Sikkim	
Galeola falconeri	Orchidaceae	I		AR (Kameng), Sikkim, Garhwal	
Galeola lindleyana	Orchidaceae	I		ML, NL, Sikkim	
Gastrodia dyeriana	Orchidaceae	I		Sikkim	
Gastrodia exilis	Orchidaceae	I		ML (Jaintia hills)	
Goodyera recurva	Orchidaceae	I		ML (Khasi hills)	
Habenaria andamanica	Orchidaceae	R		South Andaman Is.)	
Habenaria barnesii	Orchidaceae	R		KL (Idukki) TN (Nilgiri Hills)	
Habenaria denticulata	Orchidaceae	I		TN	
Habenaria fimbriata	Orchidaceae	I		TN (Nilgiri Hills)	
Habenaria panchganiensis	Orchidaceae	R		MH	
Habenaria polyodon	Orchidaceae	I		TN (Nilgiri Hills)	
Habenaria richardiana	Orchidaceae	I		KL (Travancore), TN	
Hetaeria ovalifolia	Orchidaceae	I		KL, TN (Courtallum, Tirunelveli Hills)	
Ipsea malabarica	Orchidaceae	E		KL (Silent Valley, Palghat Dt)	
Liparis beddomei	Orchidaceae	I		TN (Palani Hills)	
Liparis biloba	Orchidaceae	V		TN (Kollimund, Nilgiri Hills)	
Liparis duthiei	Orchidaceae	I		TN (Nilgiri Hills)	
Liparis platyphylla	Orchidaceae	I		TN	
Liparis pulchella	Orchidaceae	I		ML, NL	
Malleola andamanica	Orchidaceae	E		Andaman Is. (Little & south Andamans)	
Neottia kashmiriana	Orchidaceae	I		JK	
Nervilia biflora	Orchidaceae	I		KA (Mysore Hills)	
Nervilia mackinnonii	Orchidaceae	I		UK (Mussoorie; Kumaun)	
Oreorchis indica	Orchidaceae	I		HP (Simla), UK (Garhwal; Kumaun)	
Oreorchis rolfei	Orchidaceae	I		UK	
Paphiopedilum druryi	Orchidaceae	E	Critically endangered	KL (Travancore & Kalakkad Hills)	
Paphiopedilum fairrieanum	Orchidaceae	E	Critically endangered	AR, Sikkim	
Paphiopedilum hirsutissimum	Orchidaceae	R	Vulnerable	MN	
Paphiopedilum wardii	Orchidaceae	E		AR	
Peristylus brachyphyllus	Orchidaceae	I		KA, TN (Nilgiri Hills)	
Peristylus secundus	Orchidaceae	I		KA, KL, TN	
Phaius mishmensis	Orchidaceae	I		AS (Upper Assam), ML, Sikkim	
Phalaenopsis speciosa var. speciosa	Orchidaceae	E		Andaman Is., Nicobar Is.	
Pholidota calceata	Orchidaceae	I		ML (Khasi Hills)	
Pholidota wattii	Orchidaceae	R		AR (Subansiri), AS (North Cachar)	
Pleione lagenaria	Orchidaceae	Ex		ML (Khasi hills)	
Renanthera imschootiana	Orchidaceae	E		MN, MZ, NL	
Rhynchostylis latifolia	Orchidaceae	I		KA (Kadumane, Mysore)	
Risleya atropurpurea	Orchidaceae	I		Sikkim	
Spathoglottis arunachalensis	Orchidacaea		Critically endangered	Arunachal Pradesh	
Taeniophyllum andamanicum	Orchidaceae	E		Andaman Is.	
Vanda coerulea	Orchidaceae	R		AR, AS, MN, ML, MZ, NL	
Vanda wightii	Orchidaceae	Ex/E		TN	
Vanilla walkeriae	Orchidaceae	I		TN (Coimbatore hills)	
Vanilla wightiana	Orchidaceae	V		KL (Tinnevelly; Kanyakumari)	
Zeuxine andamanica	Orchidaceae	I		Andaman Is. (South Andaman Is.)	
Zeuxine pulchra	Orchidaceae	Ex/E		ML (Khasi hills), Sikkim (Lachung Valley)	
Zeuxine rolfeana	Orchidaceae	I	Critically endangered	Andaman Is. (south Andaman Is.)	
Pandanus canaranus	Pandanaceae	I		Mangalore	
Agropyron duthiei	Poaceae	I		HP, UK	
Agrostis schmidii	Poaceae	I		TN	
Andropogon longipes	Poaceae	I		TN (Nilgiri Hills)	
Arthraxon depressus	Poaceae	I		KA (Agalatti, Mysore)	
Arthraxon meeboldii	Poaceae	I		KA (Mangalore)	
Arundinaria densiflora	Poaceae	I		KL	
Bhidea burnsiana	Poaceae	R		KA, MH	
Calamagrostis decora	Poaceae	I		JK	
Catabrosa aquatica var. angusta	Poaceae	I		JK (Ladakh)	
Cenchrus prieurii var. scabra	Poaceae	I		RJ (west)	
Cenchrus rajasthanensis	Poaceae	I		RJ (Jaisalmer & Jodhpur)	
Cephalostachyum capitatum var. decomposita	Poaceae	R		Sikkim	
Chrysopogon velutinus	Poaceae	I		AP (Cuddapah)	
Coelachne minuta	Poaceae	R	Least concern	MH	
Cymbopogon flexuosus var. microstachys	Poaceae	R		UP, UK	
Cymbopogon osmastonii	Poaceae	V		UK	
Cymbopogon ramnagarensis	Poaceae	I		JK	
Deyeuxia kashmeriana	Poaceae	I		JK	
Deyeuxia simlensis	Poaceae	Ex/E		HP (Simla)	
Dichanthium armatum	Poaceae	R		MH	
Dichanthium compressum	Poaceae	R		MH (Pune District)	
Dichanthium maccannii	Poaceae	V		MH (Panchagani, Satara Dist.)	
Dichanthium pallidum	Poaceae	I		TN (Nilgiri Hills)	
Dichanthium panchaganiense	Poaceae	R		MH	
Dichanthium woodrowii	Poaceae	V		MH (Paud, Mawal taluka, Pune)	
Dimeria blatterii	Poaceae	R		MH (WG in Pune and Ratnagiri districts)	
Dimeria woodrowii	Poaceae	R		GA, KA, MH	
Eragrostis rottleri	Poaceae	Ex		TN (Tranquebar)	
Eriochrysis rangacharii	Poaceae	E		TN (Paikara, Nilgiri District)	Rediscovered in 2003
Festuca levingei	Poaceae	E		JK	
Festuca lucida	Poaceae	I		HP, JK, UK	
Garnotia schmidii	Poaceae	I		TN (Nilgiris)	
Glyphochloa divergens	Poaceae	R		KA	
Glyphochloa santapaui	Poaceae	R	Vulnerable	MH (Ratnagiri District)	
Glyphochloa talbotii	Poaceae	V		GA	
Heteropogon bellariensis	Poaceae	I		AP	
Heteropogon polystachyos	Poaceae	I		(Peninsular )	
Hubbardia heptaneuron	Poaceae	E	Vulnerable	KA (Gersoppa Falls, north Kanara)	Rediscovered and reintroduced in 2006
Isachne angladei	Poaceae	I		TN (endemic to Anaimalai and Palni Hills.)	
Isachne deccanensis	Poaceae	I		TN (Nilgiri Hills)	
Isachne dimyloides	Poaceae	R		Sikkim	
Isachne fischeri	Poaceae	R		KL	
Isachne lisboae	Poaceae	I		KA, MH (Panchgani; Mahabaleshwar)	
Isachne oreades	Poaceae	R		TN (Nilgiri Hills)	
Isachne setosa	Poaceae	R		KA, KL, TN	
Ischaemum kingii	Poaceae	I		RJ (Mt Abu)	
Ischaemum raizadae	Poaceae	R		MH (three districts)	
Ischaemum santapaui	Poaceae	I		GJ (Dangs), MH (Karjat)	
Ischnochloa falconeri	Poaceae	I		Uttar Pradesh	
Limnopoa meeboldii	Poaceae	R	Endangered	KL	
Lophochloa clarkeana	Poaceae	I		JK	
Ochlandra ebracteata	Poaceae	R		KL	
Ochlandra setigera	Poaceae	R		TN	
Ochlandra sivagiriana	Poaceae	R		TN (Sivagiri and Pulney Hills)	
Oryza jeyporensis	Poaceae	I		OR (Jeypore Tract)	
Oryzopsis humilis	Poaceae	I		Uttar Pradesh	
Oryzopsis stewartiana	Poaceae	I		HP	
Phyllostachys assamica	Poaceae	I		AR	
Poa pseudamoena	Poaceae	I		UK (Kumaun, Garhwal)	
Poa rhadina	Poaceae	E		UK (Tehri Garhwal)	
Pseudodanthonia himalaica	Poaceae	I		UK	
Puccinellia kashmiriana	Poaceae	R		HP, JK	
Puccinellia thomsonii	Poaceae	I		JK	
Schizachyrium impressum	Poaceae	E		JK	
Schizachyrium paranjpyeanum	Poaceae	R		KA, MH	
Semiarundinaria pantlingii	Poaceae	R		AR, Sikkim	
Stipa chitralensis	Poaceae	I		JK	
Teinostachyum beddomei	Poaceae	I		KL (Travancore Hills), TN (Nilgiri Hills)	
Trisetum micans	Poaceae	I		JK, UK (Tehri Garhwal)	
Smilax wightii	Smilacaceae	R		TN (Nilgiri Hills)	
Amomum hypoleucum	Zingiberaceae	I		TN	
Amomum microstephanum	Zingiberaceae	R		KA (Konkan), TN	
Boesenbergia albolutea	Zingiberaceae	I	Data deficient	Andaman	
Boesenbergia pulcherrima	Zingiberaceae	I	Least concern	KA, KL, (WG)	
Cautleya petiolata	Zingiberaceae	I		HP, Uttar Pradesh	
Curcuma decipiens	Zingiberaceae	I		(WG)	
Curcuma montana	Zingiberaceae	I		KA, TN	
Globba pauciflora	Zingiberaceae	I		S Andaman Is.	
Hedychium calcaratum	Zingiberaceae	I		ML (Khasi hills)	
Hedychium dekianum	Zingiberaceae	I		ML (Khasi & Jaintia hills)	
Hedychium gracillimum	Zingiberaceae	I		ML (Khasi hills)	
Hedychium gratum	Zingiberaceae	I		ML (Khasi hills)	
Hedychium longipedunculatum	Zingiberaceae	I		AR (Subansiri)	
Hedychium marginatum	Zingiberaceae	Ex		NL	
Hedychium rubrum	Zingiberaceae	I		ML	
Kaempferia rotunda	Zingiberaceae	I		KL (Trivandrum)	
Kaempferia siphonantha	Zingiberaceae	I		Andaman Is.	
Paracautleya bhatii	Zingiberaceae	V		KA (South Kanara Dist., Manipal)	
Zingiber cernuum	Zingiberaceae	I	Least concern	KA (Konkan)	

== See also ==
- List of least concern plants
- List of endangered plants
- List of plants that are extinct in the wild
- List of recently extinct plants
- List of extinct animals of India
- List of endangered animals in India
- Lists of extinct species
