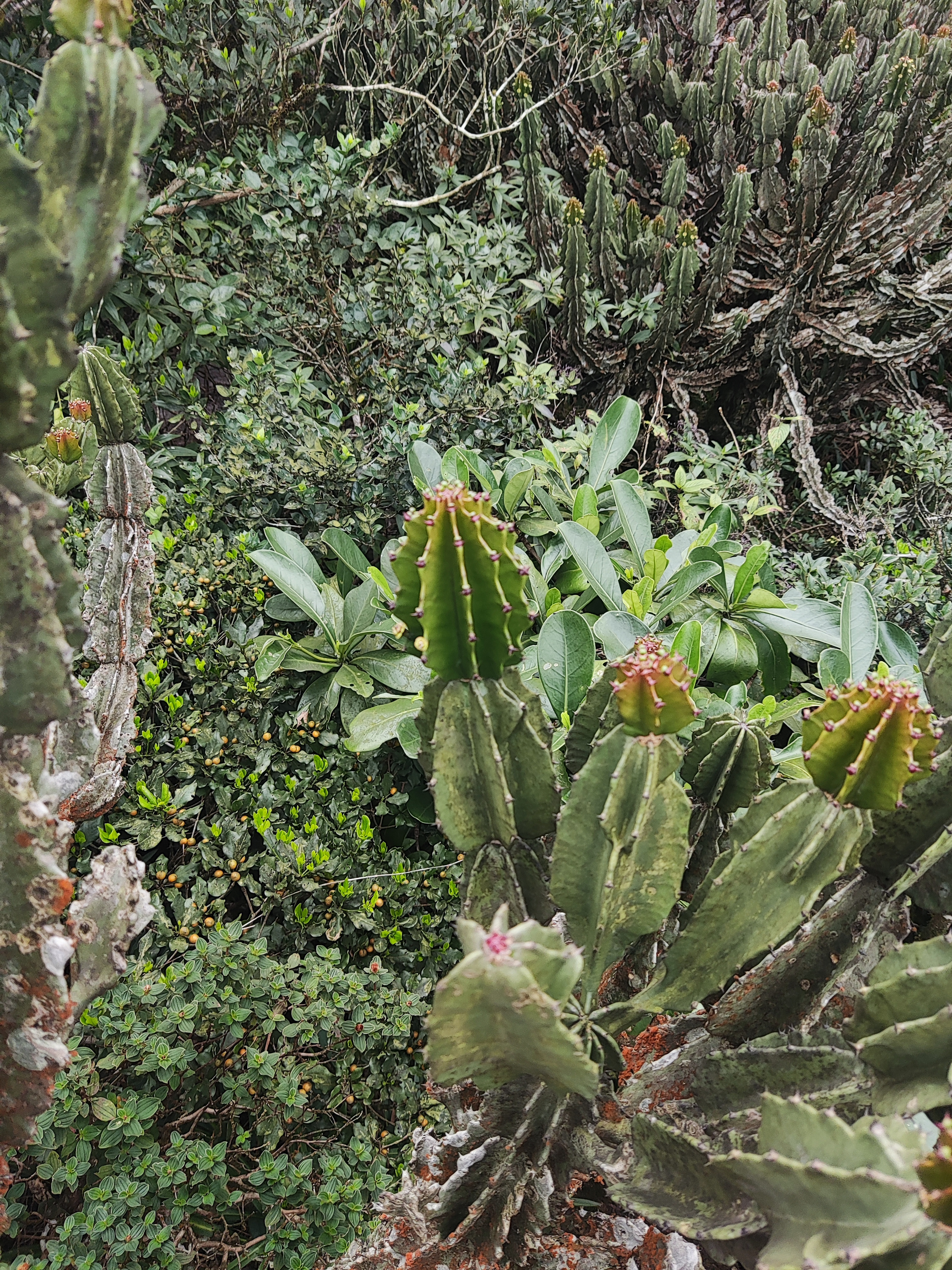

Conservation status
- Endangered (IUCN 2.3)

Scientific classification
- Kingdom: Plantae
- Clade: Tracheophytes
- Clade: Angiosperms
- Clade: Eudicots
- Clade: Rosids
- Order: Malpighiales
- Family: Euphorbiaceae
- Genus: Euphorbia
- Species: E. santapaui

Binomial name
- Euphorbia santapaui A.N.Henry

= Euphorbia santapaui =

Species of plant

Euphorbia santapaui is a species of flowering plant in the family Euphorbiaceae. It is endemic to the southern Western Ghats of Kerala and Tamil Nadu in India. It is threatened by habitat loss.
