= Carex vicinalis =

Scientific classification
- Kingdom: Plantae
- Clade: Tracheophytes
- Clade: Angiosperms
- Clade: Monocots
- Clade: Commelinids
- Order: Poales
- Family: Cyperaceae
- Genus: Carex
- Species: C. vicinalis

Binomial name
- Carex vicinalis Boott

Species of plant

Carex vicinalis is a species of sedge that was first described by Francis Boott in 1867. It is native to southern India. The type specimen was collected at the Nilghiri Hills.
