= Carex wightiana =

Scientific classification
- Kingdom: Plantae
- Clade: Tracheophytes
- Clade: Angiosperms
- Clade: Monocots
- Clade: Commelinids
- Order: Poales
- Family: Cyperaceae
- Genus: Carex
- Species: C. wightiana

Binomial name
- Carex wightiana Nees

Species of flowering plant

Carex wightiana is a tussock-forming species of perennial sedge in the family Cyperaceae. It is native to parts of India.

It was described by the botanist Christian Gottfried Daniel Nees von Esenbeck in 1834 as published in Contributions to the Botany of India.

== See also ==
- List of Carex species
