= Ficus angladei =

Conservation status
- Critically Endangered (IUCN 2.3)

Scientific classification
- Kingdom: Plantae
- Clade: Tracheophytes
- Clade: Angiosperms
- Clade: Eudicots
- Clade: Rosids
- Order: Rosales
- Family: Moraceae
- Genus: Ficus
- Species: F. angladei

Binomial name
- Ficus angladei C.E.C. Fisch.

Species of flowering plant

Ficus angladei is a critically endangered species of plant in the family Moraceae. It is endemic to the Palani Hills of Tamil Nadu, India.
