= Carex myosurus =

Conservation status
- Least Concern (IUCN 3.1)

Scientific classification
- Kingdom: Plantae
- Clade: Tracheophytes
- Clade: Angiosperms
- Clade: Monocots
- Clade: Commelinids
- Order: Poales
- Family: Cyperaceae
- Genus: Carex
- Species: C. myosurus

Binomial name
- Carex myosurus Nees

Species of sedge

Carex myosurus is a tussock-forming species of perennial sedge in the family Cyperaceae. It is native to parts of Asia from India in the west to Vietnam and China in the east.

It was described by the botanist Christian Gottfried Daniel Nees von Esenbeck in 1834 as published in Contributions to the Botany of India.

== See also ==
- List of Carex species
