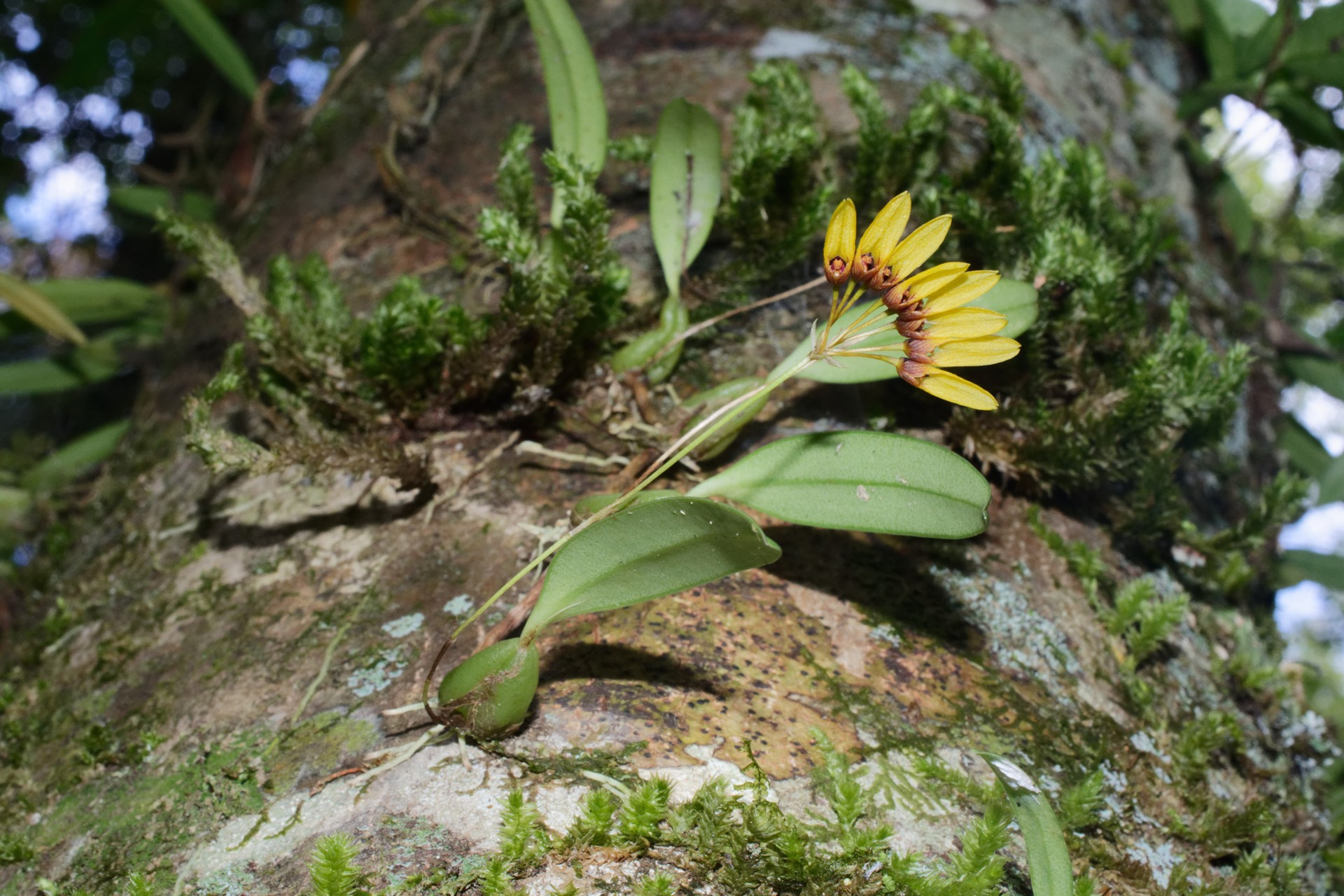
- Bulbophyllum retusiusculum

Scientific classification
- Kingdom: Plantae
- Clade: Embryophytes
- Clade: Tracheophytes
- Clade: Spermatophytes
- Clade: Angiosperms
- Clade: Monocots
- Order: Asparagales
- Family: Orchidaceae
- Subfamily: Epidendroideae
- Genus: Bulbophyllum
- Section: Bulbophyllum sect. Brachyantha; Rchb. f.

Type species
- Bulbophyllum umbellatum

Species
- See text

Synonyms
- Bulbophyllum sect. Macrostylida Garay, Hamer & Siegrrist 1994; Bulbophyllum sect. Globiceps Schltr. 1913; Bulbophyllum sect. Umbellatae Bentham 1883

= Bulbophyllum sect. Brachyantha =

Section of flowering plants

Bulbophyllum sect. Brachyantha is a section of the genus Bulbophyllum.

== Description ==
Species in this section are epiphytic with two or more flowers with 4 pollina

== Distribution ==
Plants from this section are found in Southeast Asia.

== Species ==
Bulbophyllum section Brachyantha comprises the following species:

Image	Name	Distribution	Elevation (m)
	Bulbophyllum acutiflorum A.Rich. 1841	eastern Himalayas and Arunachal Pradesh India	900–1,800 metres (3,000–5,900 ft)
	Bulbophyllum aureum (Hook. f.) J.J. Sm. 1912	India	
	Bulbophyllum baosangii Vuong, B.n. Tu, V.H. Bui, R. Amsler et J. Cootes 2021	Vietnam (Ha Giang)	1,000 metres (3,300 ft)
	Bulbophyllum bomiense Z.H.Tsi 1978	Tibet	2,000 metres (6,600 ft)
	Bulbophyllum caudatum Lindley 1829	Xizang China, northeastern India, Nepal and Sikkim	500–2,000 metres (1,600–6,600 ft)
	Bulbophyllum delitescens Hance 1876	China, Vietnam, Hong Kong, Thailand and India	800–2,500 metres (2,600–8,200 ft)
	Bulbophyllum elatum (Hook.f.) J.J.Sm. 1912	Assam India, eastern Himalayas, Nepal, Bhutan, Sikkim and Vietnam	1,600–2,500 metres (5,200–8,200 ft)
	Bulbophyllum elegantulum (Rolfe) J.J.Sm. 1912	southern India	1,300–1,700 metres (4,300–5,600 ft)
	Bulbophyllum farreri (W.W.Sm.) Seidenf. 1973 publ. 1974	Yunnan province of China, Vietnam and Myanmar	1,000 metres (3,300 ft)
	Bulbophyllum fibratum (Gagnep.) T.B.Nguyen & D.H.Duong 1984	southern Vietnam	
	Bulbophyllum fordii (Rolfe) J.J.Sm. 1912	China	2,100 metres (6,900 ft)
	Bulbophyllum funingense Z.H.Tsi & H.C.Chen 1981	China (Yunnan)	1,000 metres (3,300 ft)
	Bulbophyllum guttulatum [Hooker]Balakr. 1970	western Himalayas, Assam, eastern Himalayas, Nepal, Bhutan, Sikkim, Myanmar and Vietnam	800–2,600 metres (2,600–8,500 ft)
	Bulbophyllum japonicum [Makino] Makino 1910	Japan, China and Taiwan	600–1,500 metres (2,000–4,900 ft)
	Bulbophyllum jingdongense A.Q. Hu, D.P. Ye & Jian W. Li 2017	China (Yunnan), Laos	500–1,550 metres (1,640–5,090 ft)
	Bulbophyllum kaitiense Rchb.f. 1861	India	2,000–2,500 metres (6,600–8,200 ft)
	Bulbophyllum kontumense Gagnep. 1950	Vietnam	
	Bulbophyllum lasiochilum Parish & Rchb.f 1874	India, Myanmar, Thailand and Malaysia	1,200–1,500 metres (3,900–4,900 ft)
	Bulbophyllum macraei (Lindl.) Rchb. f. 1861	India, Ceylon, Japan, Taiwan and Vietnam	300–1,500 metres (980–4,920 ft)
	Bulbophyllum manhdatii Vuong, Aver., V.S.Dang & Q.T.Truong 2021	Vietnam (Lam Dong)	
	Bulbophyllum mamillatum Vuong, Aver. & V.S.Dang 2022	Vietnam (Ha Giang)	1,500 metres (4,900 ft)
	Bulbophyllum muscicola Rchb.f. 1872	Nepal and Assam	1,500 metres (4,900 ft)
	Bulbophyllum mysorense J.J. Sm. 1912	India	
	Bulbophyllum nipondhii Seidenf. 1985	Thailand and China (Yunnan)	1,300 metres (4,300 ft)
	Bulbophyllum orezii Sath. Kumar 2004	India (Kerala)	900–1,000 metres (3,000–3,300 ft)
	Bulbophyllum phanquyetii Vuong, Aver. & V.S.Dang 2022	Vietnam (Lai Chau)	
	Bulbophyllum polliculosum Seidenf. 1973	Myanmar, Thailand and Vietnam	
	Bulbophyllum pumilio (Parish & Rchb. f.) Parish & Rchb. f. 1874	Myanmar, Thailand and Vietnam	1,000–1,200 metres (3,300–3,900 ft)
	Bulbophyllum punakhaense P.Gyeltshen, K.Rabgay & Kumar 2023	Bhutan	
	Bulbophyllum putaoensis Q.Liu 2017	Myanmar	830 metres (2,720 ft)
	Bulbophyllum reflexipetalum J.D.Ya, Y.J.Guo & C.Liu 2019	Xizang China	1,378 metres (4,521 ft)
	Bulbophyllum reichenbachianum Kraenzl. 1893	India and Myanmar	
	Bulbophyllum retusiusculum Rchb. f. 1869	China, Nepal, eastern Himalayas, Assam India, Bhutan, Sikkim, Myanmar, Thailand, Malaysia, Laos, Vietnam, and Taiwan	500–3,000 metres (1,600–9,800 ft)
	Bulbophyllum retusum H. Jiang, D.P. Ye & J.D. Ya 2021	China(Yunnan), Vietnam	1,400–2,100 metres (4,600–6,900 ft)
	Bulbophyllum rolfei (Kuntze) Seidenf. 1979	India, Assam, Bhutan, Nepal, eastern Himalayas and Yunnan China	2,000–2,800 metres (6,600–9,200 ft)
	Bulbophyllum salweenense X.H.Jin 2015	Yunnan China	1,500 metres (4,900 ft)
	Bulbophyllum sarcoscapum Teijsm. & Binn. 1867	Java	
	Bulbophyllum seidenfadenii A.D.Kerr 1973	China (Yunnan), Vietnam, Thailand, and Laos	500–1,600 metres (1,600–5,200 ft)
	Bulbophyllum silentvalliensis M.P.Sharma & S.K.Srivast. 1993	India (Kerala)	1,500 metres (4,900 ft)
	Bulbophyllum socordine J.J.Verm. & Cootes 2008	the Philippines	1,200 metres (3,900 ft)
	Bulbophyllum sphaericum Z.H.Tsi & H.Li 1981	Sichuan and Yunnan province of China	
	Bulbophyllum sungwookii Vuong et. V.C. Nguyen 2024	Vietnam (Phu Yen)	
	Bulbophyllum spathulatum (Rolfe ex E. Cooper) Seidenf. 1970	Assam, eastern Himalayas, Sikkim, Myanmar, Laos and Vietnam	1,000–2,000 metres (3,300–6,600 ft)
	Bulbophyllum thaiorum J.J.Smith 1912	Thailand, Myanmar and Vietnam	600–2,000 metres (2,000–6,600 ft)
	Bulbophyllum thydoi Vuong, Q.T.Truong, J.Ponert & J.J.Verm. 2019	Vietnam	1,800–2,000 metres (5,900–6,600 ft)
	Bulbophyllum tianguii K.Y.Lang & D.Luo 2007	China (Guangxi), northern Vietnam (Ha Giang)	900–1,000 metres (3,000–3,300 ft)
	Bulbophyllum tigridum Hance 1883	China, Hong Kong and Taiwan	
	Bulbophyllum trongquyetii Vuong, Aver., R.Amsler & V.S.Dang 2020	Vietnam	1,000–1,100 metres (3,300–3,600 ft)
	Bulbophyllum umbellatum Lindley 1830	western Himalayas, eastern Himalayas, Assam, India, Nepal, Bhutan, Myanmar, Thailand, Southern China	1,000–2,200 metres (3,300–7,200 ft)
	Bulbophyllum unciniferum Seidenf. 1973	southern Yunnan China and northern Thailand	1,100–1,500 metres (3,600–4,900 ft)
	Bulbophyllum ustusfortiter J.J.Verm. 1993	New Guinea	440–900 metres (1,440–2,950 ft)
	Bulbophyllum versicolor Z.Zhou, P.Y.Wu & Z.J.Liu 2021	China (Yunnan)	1,300 metres (4,300 ft)
	Bulbophyllum violaceolabellum Seidenf. 1981	Yunnan China and Laos	
	Bulbophyllum wolongense G.W. Hu, Y.H. Cheng & Q.F. Wang 2023	China(Sichuan)	1,630 metres (5,350 ft)
