= List of endemic plants in the Nilgiri Biosphere Reserve =

Of the 3,300 species of flowering plants in the Nilgiri Biosphere Reserve in southern India, 132 are endemic. The reserve encompasses portions of the Western Ghats and Nilgiri Hills in the states of Karnataka, Kerala, and Tamil Nadu. They are listed by plant family. Plants with an asterisk* are listed in The IUCN Red List of Threatened Species. Plants with a dagger (†) are presumed extinct.

Acanthaceae
- Andrographis lobelioides
- Andrographis stellulata
- Leptacanthus amabilis
- Mackenziea homotropa
- Mackenziea violacea
- Nilgirianthus papillosus
- Nilgirianthus wighteanus
- Phlebophyllum lanatum
- Plecaulis sessilis
- Rhinacanthus nasutus var. montanus
- Thelepaepale bicolor

Adoxaceae

- Viburnum hebanthum

Amaranthaceae

- Achyranthes aspera f. var. rubrofusca

Annonaceae

- Goniothalamus wynaadensis*

Apiaceae

- Bunium nothum*

Apocynaceae

- Baeolepis nervosa

Aquifoliaceae

- Ilex gardneriana*†

Araceae

- Arisaema auriculatum
- Arisaema pulchrum
- Arisaema transluscens
- Arisaema tuberculatum
- Arisaema tylophorum

Arecaceae

- Calamus gamblei var sphaerocarpa

Asclepiadaceae

- Brachystelma maculatum
- Caralluma nilagiriana

Asteraceae

- Anaphalis neelgeiryana
- Anaphalis notoniana
- Helichrysum wightii
- Senecio kundaicus
- Senecio lawsonii
- Senecio lessigianus
- Senecio polycephalus
- Vemonia saligina var nilghirensis
- Youngia nilgirriensis

Balsaminaceae

- Impatiens clavicornus
- Impatiens debilis
- Impatiens denisonii
- Impatiens laticornis
- Impatiens levengei
- Impatiens munronii
- Impatiens neo-barnesii
- Impatiens nilagirica
- Impatiens orchioides

Celastraceae

- Microtropis densiflora*

Chrysobalanaceae

- Atuna indica*

Commelinaceae

- Commelina tricolor

Convolvulaceae

- Argyreia coonoorensis

Cyperaceae

- Carex christii
- Carex pseudo-asperata
- Carex vicinalis
- Carex curvibracteatus
- Fimbristylis latiniglumifera
- Fimbristylis latinucifera
- Fimbristylis rectifolia

Eriocaulaceae

- Eriocaulon christopheri
- Eriocaulon gamblei
- Eriocaulon pectinatum*
- Eriocaulon robustum*

Euphorbiaceae

- Dalechampia velutina
- Glochidion sisparense
- Mallotus subramanyamii
- Reidia timbriata

Fabaceae

- Acacia hohenackeri
- Crotalaria bidei
- Crotalaria formosa
- Crotalaria obtecta
- Dalbergia gardneriana
- Tephrosia wynaadensis

Gentianaceae

- Swertia lawii

Labiatae

- Anisochilus dysophylloides var purpureus
- Leucas pubescens
- Leucas rosmarinifolia
- Pogostemon nilagiricus
- Pogostemon paludosus
- Teucrium wightii

Lauraceae

- Actinodaphne lanata*
- Actinodaphne lawsonii*
- Actinodaphne salicina*
- Litsea stocksii f. var. glabrescens

Loranthaceae

- Dendrophthoe memecylifolia
- Dendrophthoe neelgherrensis var clarkei
- Loranthus recurvus

Melastomataceae

- Memecylon flavescens*
- Memecylon lawsonii
- Memecylon sisparense*
- Sonerila versicolor var. axillaris
- Sonerila wynaadensis

Myrtaceae

- Eugenia argentea
- Meteoromyrtus wynaadensis*
- Syzygium malabaricum

Orchidaceae

- Aerides elatoir
- Bulbophyllum acutiflorum
- Bulbophyllum aureum
- Bulbophyllum fusco-purpureum
- Bulbophyllum kaitiense
- Bulbophyllum nodosum
- Coelogyne odoratissima var. angustifolia
- Corymborkis veratifolia
- Eria nana
- Eria polystachya
- Habenaria cephalotes
- Habenaria denticulata
- Habenaria polyodon
- Liparis biloba
- Malaxis crenulata
- Spiranthes sinensis var. wightiana
- Thrixspermum muscaeflorum var nilagiricum
- Vanda wightii

Oxalidaceae

- Biophytum polyphyllum

Pittosporaceae

- Pittosporum viridulum*

Poaceae

- Andropogon longipes
- Andropogon polyptychus
- Arudinella purpurea
- Arudinella setosa var nilgiriana
- Brachiaria semiundulata
- Eriochrysis rangacharii
- Garnotia schmidii
- Isachne deccanensis
- Isachne nilagiricum
- Isachne oreades
- Ochlandra beddomei
- Ochlandra setigera
- Panicum fischeri
- Poa gamblei

Primulaceae

- Embelia gardneriana
- Maesa velutina*

Ranunculaceae

- Clematis theobromina

Rubiaceae

- Hedyotis hirsutissima
- Lasianthus ciliatus
- Oldenlandia hirsutissima
- Oldenlandia sisparensis
- Ophiorrhiza brunois var brunois
- Ophiorrhiza pykarensis*
- Pavetta brunois
- Pavetta hohenhackeri
- Pavetta wightii

Rutaceae

- Melicope indica*

Sapotaceae

- Isonandra perrottetiana

Smilacaceae

- Smilax wightii*

Symplocaceae

- Symplocos microphylla
- Symplocos pulchra

Umbelliferae

- Bupleurum plantaginifolium
- Heracleum hookerianum

Urticaceae

- Pouzolzia wightii f.var. nilghirensis

Viscaceae

- Viscum orbiculatum
