= Carlesia =

Carlesia may refer to:

- Carlesia (plant), a genus of plants Dunn 1902 in the family Apiaceae
- Carlesia (mammal), a genus Kraglievich 1926 of mammals in the family Dinomyidae
- Carlesia (reptile), a genus Huene 1931 of lizards in the suborder Lacertilia
