= B. japonicum =

B. japonicum may refer to:

- Blepharisma japonicum, a protozoan species
- Bradyrhizobium japonicum, a bacterium species
- Bulbophyllum japonicum, an orchid species
- Botrychium japonicum, a fern species
