= M. fascicularis =

M. fascicularis may refer to:

- Macaca fascicularis, the crab-eating macaque, a monkey species
- Microtropis fascicularis, a plant species endemic to Malaysia
