= Rhinacanthus grandiflorus =

Conservation status
- Critically Endangered (IUCN 3.1)

Scientific classification
- Kingdom: Plantae
- Clade: Embryophytes
- Clade: Tracheophytes
- Clade: Spermatophytes
- Clade: Angiosperms
- Clade: Eudicots
- Clade: Asterids
- Order: Lamiales
- Family: Acanthaceae
- Genus: Rhinacanthus
- Species: R. grandiflorus

Binomial name
- Rhinacanthus grandiflorus Dunn

Type of plant

Rhinacanthus grandiflorus is a plant from the family Acanthaceae, native to Arunachal Pradesh in Northeast India. It was first described by British botanist Dunn in 1920.

== Taxonomy ==
The specimen was found and documented by Col. Isaac Henry Burkill during the Abor Expedition 1911-12 and later sent to the Calcutta Herbarium (now, Central National Herbarium, Howrah). It was then described by British botanist Dunn in 1920.

== Distribution and habitat ==
The plant specimen was first found in the Abor Hills in the Eastern Himalayas biodiversity hotspot. It was then in the shade of the now extinct hopea shingkeng in the locality of Janakmukh and Ramidambang villages.

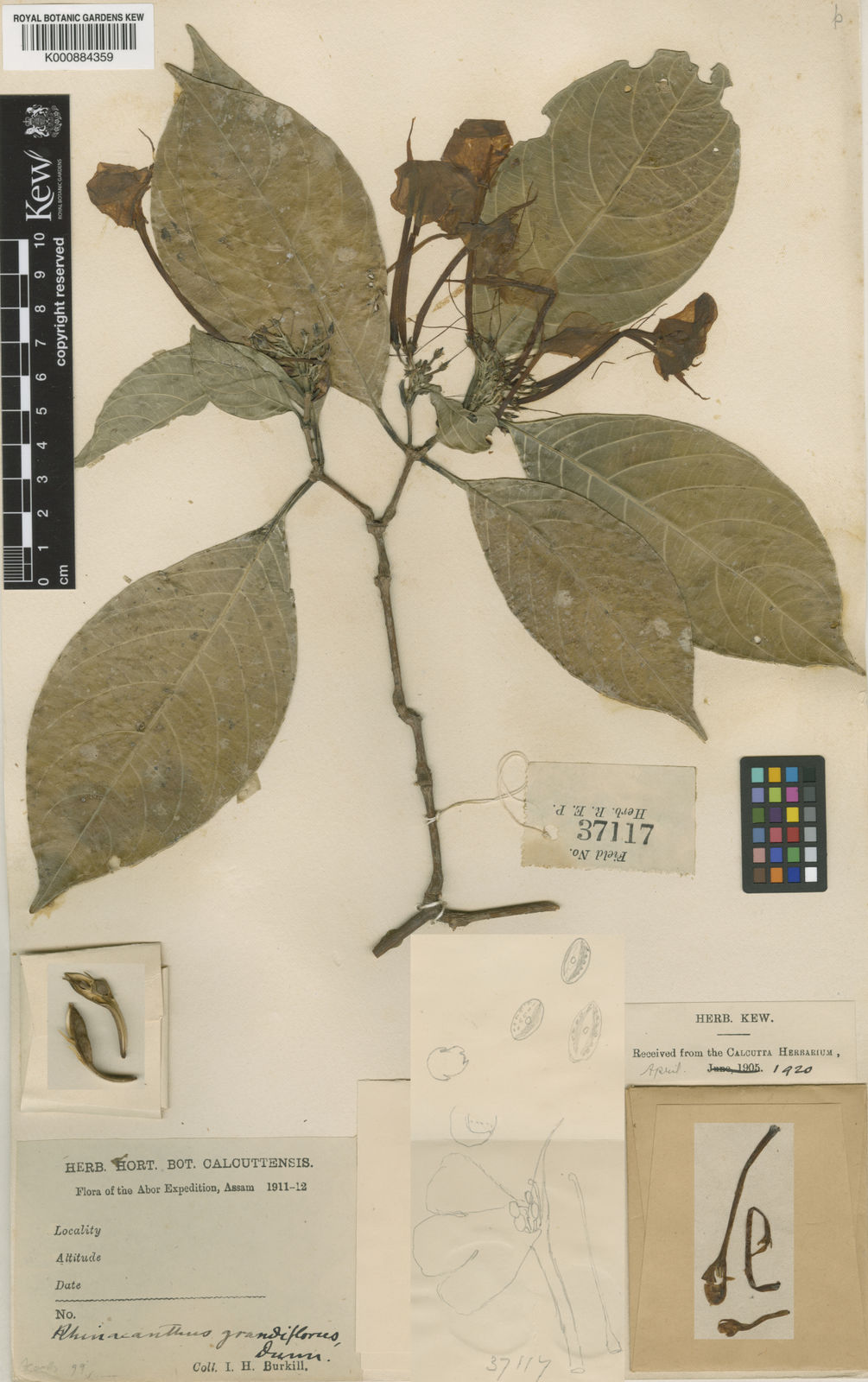
Specimen collected during the Abor Expedition 1911-12 by Col. Isaac Henry Burkill
