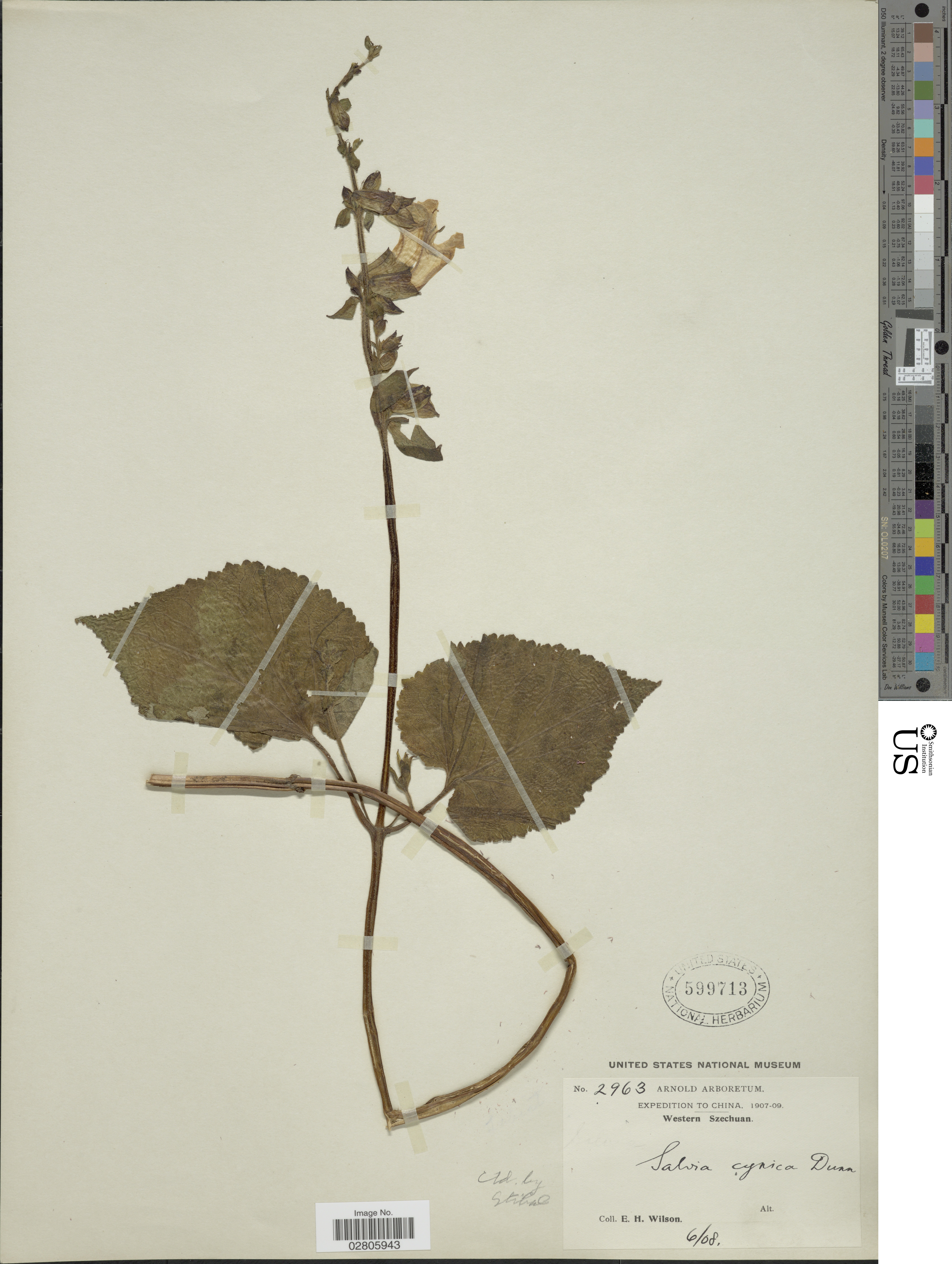

Scientific classification
- Kingdom: Plantae
- Clade: Tracheophytes
- Clade: Angiosperms
- Clade: Eudicots
- Clade: Asterids
- Order: Lamiales
- Family: Lamiaceae
- Genus: Salvia
- Species: S. cynica

Binomial name
- Salvia cynica Dunn

= Salvia cynica =

Species of flowering plant

Salvia cynica is a perennial plant that is native to Sichuan province in China, growing in forests and streamsides at 1,500 to 3,200 m (4,900 to 10,500 ft) elevation. The leaves are broadly ovate to broadly hastate-ovate or subcircular, ranging in size from 5 to 20 cm (2.0 to 7.9 in) long and 3 to 18 cm (1.2 to 7.1 in) wide.

Inflorescences are 2–6-flowered widely spaced verticillasters in raceme-panicles up to 20 cm (7.9 in) long. The yellow corolla is 4 cm (1.6 in), blooming July–August.
