= Microtropis valida =

Conservation status
- Least Concern (IUCN 3.1)

Scientific classification
- Kingdom: Plantae
- Clade: Tracheophytes
- Clade: Angiosperms
- Clade: Eudicots
- Clade: Rosids
- Order: Celastrales
- Family: Celastraceae
- Genus: Microtropis
- Species: M. valida

Binomial name
- Microtropis valida Ridl.

Synonyms
- Microtropis bicolor Merr. & F.L.Freeman; Microtropis pauciflora Boerl. ex Merr. & O.M.Freeman

Species of plant

Microtropis valida is a plant in the family Celastraceae. The specific epithet valida means 'growing strongly'.

== Description ==
Microtropis valida grows as a shrub or tree up to 5 m (20 ft) tall. The leathery leaves are elliptic to lanceolate to ovate and measure up to 27 cm (11 in) long. The fruits measure up to 2 cm (0.8 in) long.

== Distribution and habitat ==
Microtropis valida is native to Borneo, Peninsular Malaysia and Sumatra. Its habitat is forests to elevations of 1,350 m (4,000 ft).
