= Microtropis zeylanica =

Scientific classification
- Kingdom: Plantae
- Clade: Tracheophytes
- Clade: Angiosperms
- Clade: Eudicots
- Clade: Rosids
- Order: Celastrales
- Family: Celastraceae
- Genus: Microtropis
- Species: M. zeylanica

Binomial name
- Microtropis zeylanica Merr. & F.L.Freeman

Species of flowering plant

Microtropis zeylanica is a species of plant in the family Celastraceae. It is endemic to Sri Lanka.
