= Microtropis kinabaluensis =

Scientific classification
- Kingdom: Plantae
- Clade: Tracheophytes
- Clade: Angiosperms
- Clade: Eudicots
- Clade: Rosids
- Order: Celastrales
- Family: Celastraceae
- Genus: Microtropis
- Species: M. kinabaluensis

Binomial name
- Microtropis kinabaluensis Merr. & F.L.Freeman

Synonyms
- Microtropis sterrophylla Merr. & F.L.Freeman

Species of plant

Microtropis kinabaluensis is a plant in the family Celastraceae. It is named for Mount Kinabalu in Borneo.

== Description ==
Microtropis kinabaluensis grows as a shrub or tree up to 5 m (16 ft) tall. The leathery leaves are oblong to elliptic and measure up to 24.5 cm (10 in) long. The inflorescences are in panicles and feature white flowers. The fruits ripen red and measure up to 2 cm (0.8 in) long.

== Distribution and habitat ==
Microtropis kinabaluensis is endemic to Borneo. Its habitat is forests to elevations of 1,500 m (5,000 ft).
