= Kenyacanthus =

Conservation status
- Endangered (IUCN 3.1)

Scientific classification
- Kingdom: Plantae
- Clade: Tracheophytes
- Clade: Angiosperms
- Clade: Eudicots
- Clade: Asterids
- Order: Lamiales
- Family: Acanthaceae
- Genus: Kenyacanthus; I.Darbysh. & Kiel
- Species: K. ndorensis

Binomial name
- Kenyacanthus ndorensis (Schweinf.) I.Darbysh. & Kiel

Synonyms
- Rhinacanthus ndorensis Schweinf.

Genus of flowering plants

Kenyacanthus is a monotypic genus of plants in the family Acanthaceae. Its sole species, Kenyacanthus ndorensis, is an endangered species endemic to Kenya.

== Taxonomy and history ==
Georg August Schweinfurth described Rhinacanthus ndorensis in 1892 based on a type specimen collected near Mount Kenya. Though originally placed in the genus Rhinacanthus, phylogenetic analysis conducted in 2017 found that R. ndorensis was not closely related to other Rhinacanthus. In 2019, after conducting DNA and morphological analyses, Iain Darbyshire and Carrie A. Kiel erected the monotypic genus Kenyacanthus to contain this species.

== Distribution and habitat ==
Endemic to Kenya, Kenyacanthus ndorensis has a restricted distribution around Nyeri, Nanyuki, and Rumuruti in the counties of Laikipia and Nyeri at elevations of 1,700–2,150 m (5,580–7,050 ft) above sea level. It grows in grasslands, open woodlands, and on road verges, sometimes growing on seasonally flooded clay soils.
