= Microtropis wallichiana =

Scientific classification
- Kingdom: Plantae
- Clade: Tracheophytes
- Clade: Angiosperms
- Clade: Eudicots
- Clade: Rosids
- Order: Celastrales
- Family: Celastraceae
- Genus: Microtropis
- Species: M. wallichiana

Binomial name
- Microtropis wallichiana Wight ex Thw.

Synonyms
- Paracelastrus wallichianus (Wight ex Thwaites) F.N.Williams

Species of tree

Microtropis wallichiana is a species of small tree in the family Celastraceae. It is native to India and Sri Lanka. Its leaves are simple, opposite, decussate, and estipulate. The tree grows to about 15 meters (49 feet). Branchlets are yellowish in mature trees and darker in the youngest. The fruit is a capsule, 1-seeded; flowers are bisexual with 5 petals. Flowering and fruiting occur in December and January.
