= Microtropis ovata =

Conservation status
- Vulnerable (IUCN 3.1)

Scientific classification
- Kingdom: Plantae
- Clade: Tracheophytes
- Clade: Angiosperms
- Clade: Eudicots
- Clade: Rosids
- Order: Celastrales
- Family: Celastraceae
- Genus: Microtropis
- Species: M. ovata

Binomial name
- Microtropis ovata Merr. & F.L.Freeman

Species of plant

Microtropis ovata is a plant in the family Celastraceae. The specific epithet ovata means 'egg-shaped', referring to the leaves.

== Description ==
Microtropis ovata grows as a shrub up to 3 m (10 ft) tall. The leathery leaves are oblong to ovate and measure up to 10 cm (4 in) long. The flowers are in cymes.

== Distribution and habitat ==
Microtropis ovata is endemic to Borneo, where it is confined to Mount Kinabalu. Its habitat is in high-elevation forests, to elevations of 3,400 m (11,200 ft).

== Conservation ==
Microtropis ovata has been assessed as vulnerable on the IUCN Red List. It is threatened by landslides and climate change. The species is confined to Kinabalu Park in Sabah, where it is protected.
