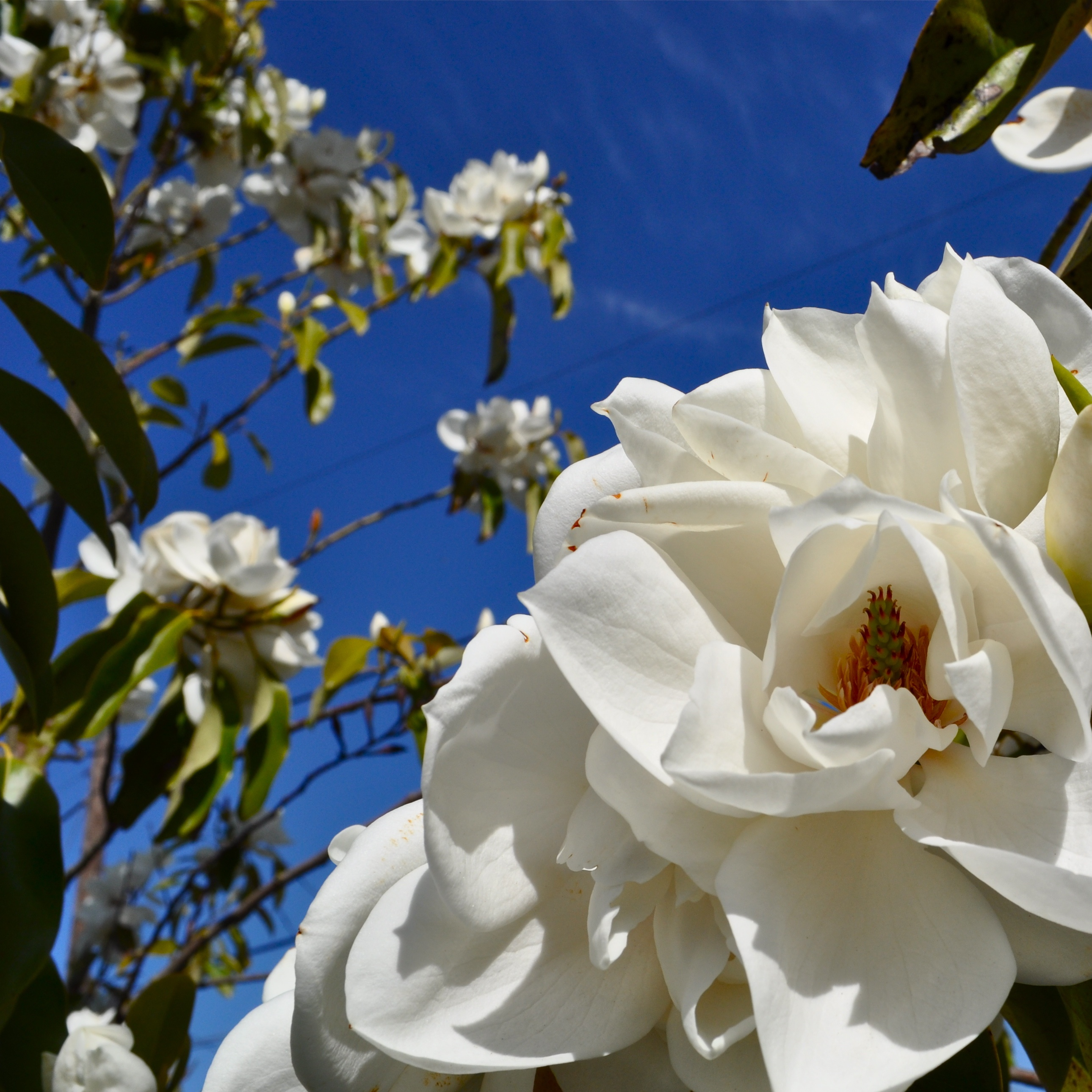
- Close-up of flower
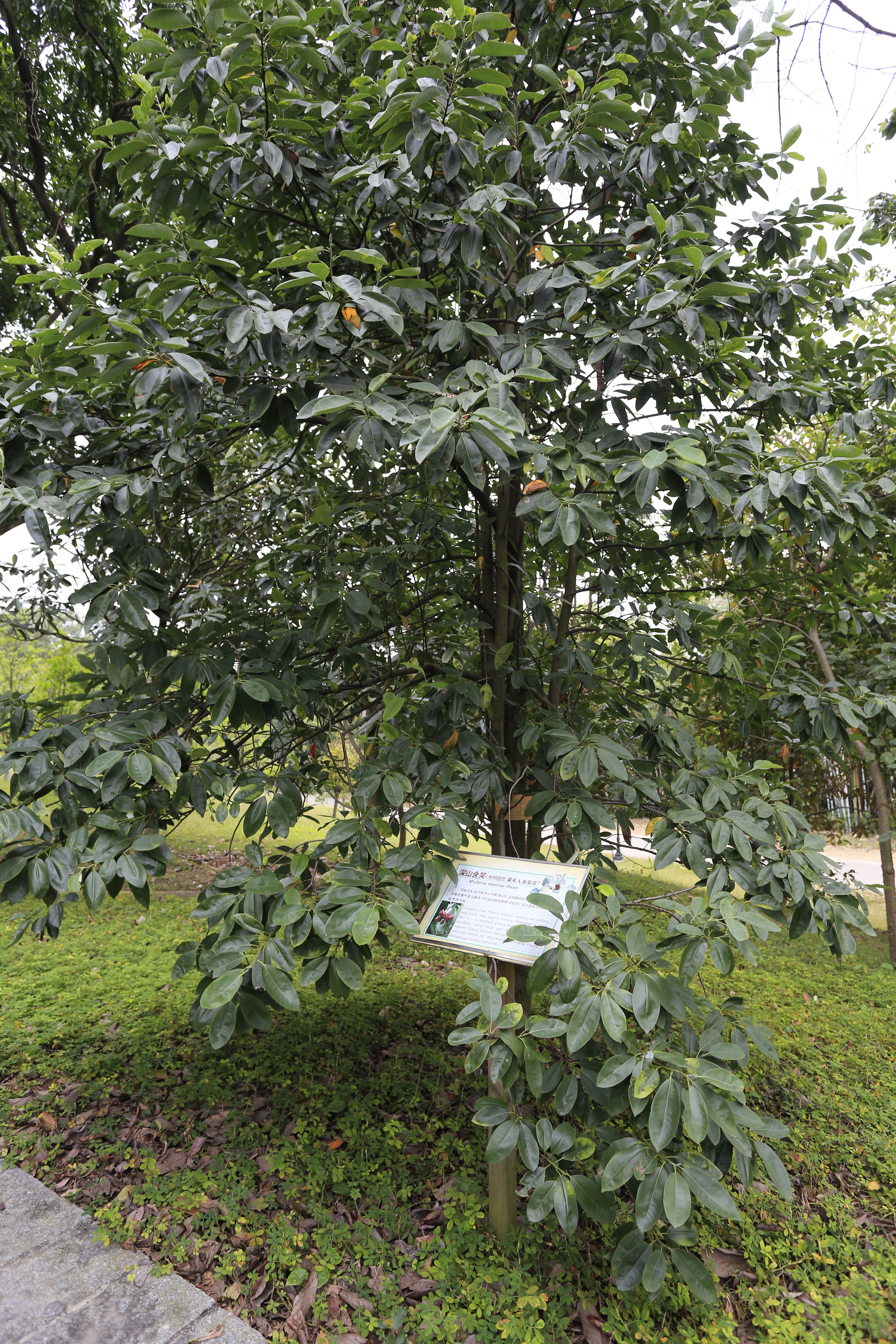
- At the South China National Botanical Garden

Conservation status
- Least Concern (IUCN 3.1)

Scientific classification
- Kingdom: Plantae
- Clade: Embryophytes
- Clade: Tracheophytes
- Clade: Spermatophytes
- Clade: Angiosperms
- Clade: Magnoliids
- Order: Magnoliales
- Family: Magnoliaceae
- Genus: Magnolia
- Species: M. maudiae

Binomial name
- Magnolia maudiae (Dunn) Figlar

Synonyms
- List: Magnolia gelida (T.B.Zhao, Z.X.Chen & D.L.Fu) C.B.Callaghan & Png; Magnolia maudiae var. rubicunda (T.P.Yi & J.C.Fan) C.B.Callaghan & Png; Magnolia platypetala (Hand.-Mazz.) C.B.Callaghan & Png; Michelia cavaleriei var. platypetala (Hand.-Mazz.) N.H.Xia; Michelia chingii W.C.Cheng; Michelia gelida T.B.Zhao, Z.X.Chen & D.L.Fu; Michelia maudiae Dunn; Michelia maudiae var. rubicunda T.P.Yi & J.C.Fan; Michelia platypetala Hand.-Mazz.

= Magnolia maudiae =

Species of plant

Magnolia maudiae (syn. Michelia maudiae), the smiling monkey forest tree, (Note: There are no "smiling monkeys", the name parses with "monkey forest" referring to deep forest.) is a species of flowering plant in the family Magnoliaceae. It is native to southern China, including Hainan. A shrubby tree occasionally reaching 20 m (66 ft) in the wild, it is found growing in evergreen broadleaf forests from 600 to 1,500 m (2,000 to 4,900 ft) above sea level. A well-shaped evergreen species, it blooms early with heavily fragrant white flowers, and has attractive bluish-green leaves. It is used as a street tree in southern Chinese cities.

== Subtaxa ==
The following subtaxa are accepted:

- Magnolia maudiae var. maudiae – entire range
- Magnolia maudiae var. platypetala (Hand.-Mazz.) Sima – mainland China
