= Carlesia sinensis =

Scientific classification
- Kingdom: Plantae
- Clade: Tracheophytes
- Clade: Angiosperms
- Clade: Eudicots
- Clade: Asterids
- Order: Apiales
- Family: Apiaceae
- Subfamily: Apioideae
- Tribe: Selineae
- Genus: Carlesia; Dunn
- Species: C. sinensis

Binomial name
- Carlesia sinensis Dunn

Synonyms
- Species synonymy: Cuminum sinensis (Dunn) M.Hiroe; Seseli taquetii H.Wolff

Species of flowering plant

Carlesia sinensis is a species of flowering plant in the Apiaceae and is the only member of the genus Carlesia. It is endemic to eastern China.

== Description ==
The species can grow anywhere from 10–30 cm (3.9–11.8 in) tall. Its taproots are 8–25 mm (0.31–0.98 in) thick. The leaves are 2.5–7 by 1–3.5 cm (0.98–2.76 by 0.39–1.38 in) in size and their ultimate segments are linear with dimensions of 4–10 by 1 mm (0.157–0.394 by 0.039 in). The upper leaves are reduced in size and are 3-parted. The umbels (clusters of flowers) measure 1.8–4 cm (0.71–1.57 in) in width and their umbellules are many-flowered. The peduncles (main stalks of the inflorescence) measure 1.5–8 cm (0.59–3.15 in). The rays normally number 7-12 but can be as numerous as 20 and measure 1–3 cm (0.39–1.18 in) in length. The bracts have dimensions of 5–8 mm (0.20–0.31 in) by 1 mm (0.039 in) and the bracteoles are 2–5 mm (0.079–0.197 in) long. The pedicels are 2–3 mm (0.079–0.118 in) long. The sepals measure 0.6–1 by 0.2–0.5 mm (0.0236–0.0394 by 0.0079–0.0197 in) . The fruits measure around 1.3 by 0.8 mm (0.051 by 0.031 in).

The species flowers and fruits from July–September.
