= Microtropis sabahensis =

Conservation status
- Vulnerable (IUCN 2.3)

Scientific classification
- Kingdom: Plantae
- Clade: Tracheophytes
- Clade: Angiosperms
- Clade: Eudicots
- Clade: Rosids
- Order: Celastrales
- Family: Celastraceae
- Genus: Microtropis
- Species: M. sabahensis

Binomial name
- Microtropis sabahensis Kochummen

Species of tree

Microtropis sabahensis is a species of plant in the family Celastraceae. It is a tree endemic to Borneo where it is confined to Sabah.

Microtropis sabahensis is a small tree. It is known only from the type specimen collected at Kinabatangan.

It grows in lowland rain forest and seasonal freshwater swamp forest.
