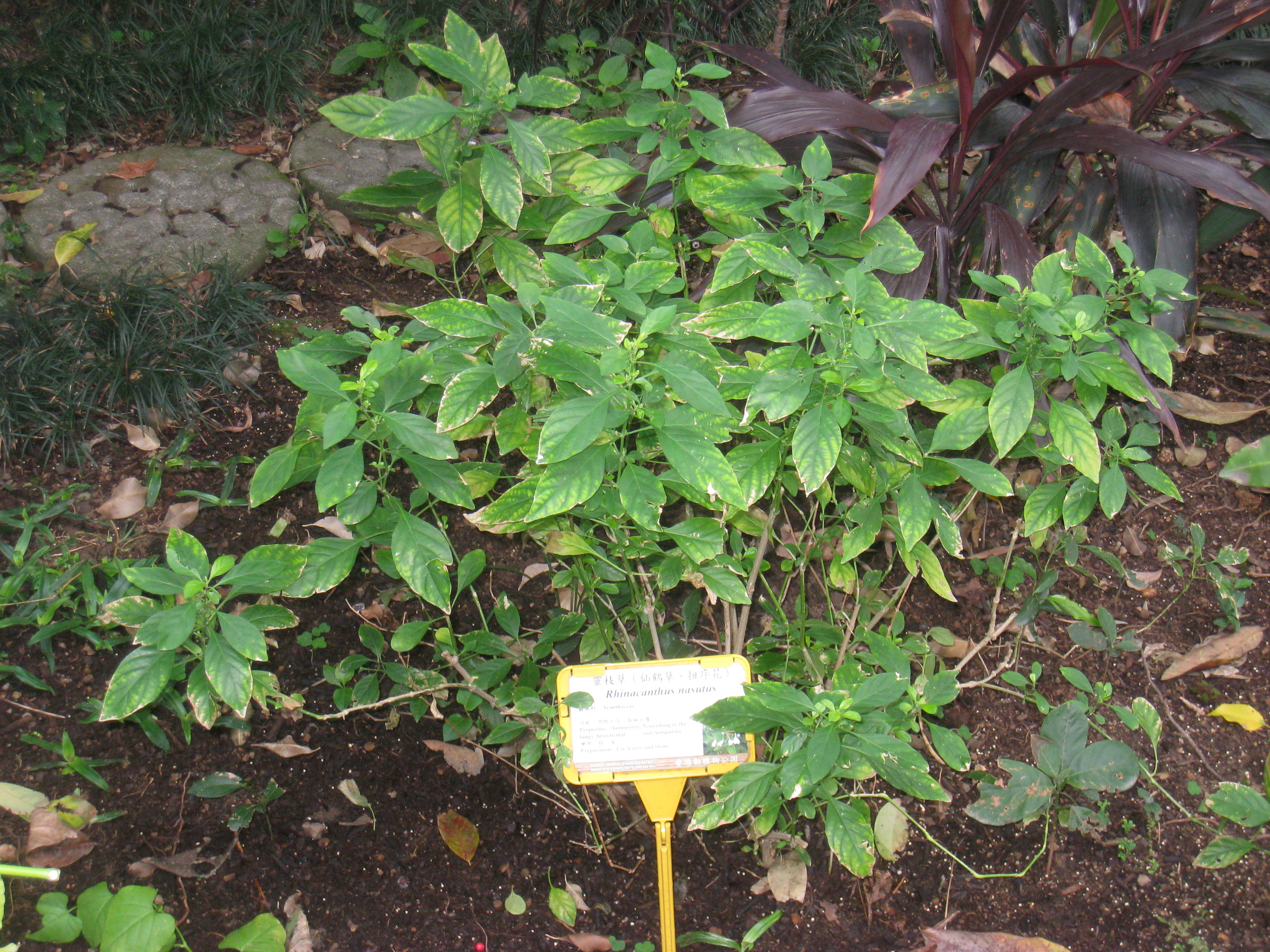
- Rhinacanthus nasutus

Scientific classification
- Kingdom: Plantae
- Clade: Tracheophytes
- Clade: Angiosperms
- Clade: Eudicots
- Clade: Asterids
- Order: Lamiales
- Family: Acanthaceae
- Subfamily: Acanthoideae
- Tribe: Justicieae
- Genus: Rhinacanthus; Nees (1832)

Species
- See text

= Rhinacanthus =

Genus of flowering plants

Rhinacanthus is a genus of plants in the family Acanthaceae. It includes 26 species native to tropical Africa and Asia, ranging across sub-Saharan Africa to Madagascar, the Indian subcontinent, Indochina, south-central China, Peninsular Malaysia, and the Philippines.

== Species ==
26 species are accepted.

- Rhinacanthus angolensis I.Darbysh.
- Rhinacanthus angulicaulis I.Darbysh.
- Rhinacanthus beesianus Diels
- Rhinacanthus calcaratus (Wall) Nees
- Rhinacanthus dichotomus (Lindau) I.Darbysh.
- Rhinacanthus flavovirens Amaras. & Wijes.
- Rhinacanthus gracilis Klotzsch
- Rhinacanthus grandiflorus Dunn
- Rhinacanthus humilis Benoist
- Rhinacanthus kaokoensis K.Balkwill & S.Will.
- Rhinacanthus mucronatus Ensermu
- Rhinacanthus nasutus (L.) Kurz
- Rhinacanthus oblongus (Nees) Nees
- Rhinacanthus obtusifolius (Heine) I.Darbysh.
- Rhinacanthus osmospermus Bojer ex Nees
- Rhinacanthus perrieri Benoist
- Rhinacanthus polonnaruwensis L.H.Cramer
- Rhinacanthus pulcher Milne-Redh.
- Rhinacanthus rotundifolius C.B.Clarke
- Rhinacanthus scoparius Balf.f.
- Rhinacanthus selousensis I.Darbysh.
- Rhinacanthus spiciformis Y.F.Deng, Z.L.Lin & D.V.Hai
- Rhinacanthus submontanus T.Harris & I.Darbysh.
- Rhinacanthus virens (Nees) Milne-Redh.
- Rhinacanthus xerophilus A.Meeuse
- Rhinacanthus zambesiacus I.Darbysh.

=== Formerly placed here ===
- Kenyacanthus ndorensis (Schweinf.) I.Darbysh. & Kiel (as Rhinacanthus ndorensis Schweinf. & Mildbr.)
