= Microtropis keningauensis =

Conservation status
- Vulnerable (IUCN 3.1)

Scientific classification
- Kingdom: Plantae
- Clade: Tracheophytes
- Clade: Angiosperms
- Clade: Eudicots
- Clade: Rosids
- Order: Celastrales
- Family: Celastraceae
- Genus: Microtropis
- Species: M. keningauensis

Binomial name
- Microtropis keningauensis Kochummen

Species of flowering plant

Microtropis keningauensis is a species of plant in the family Celastraceae. It is endemic to Borneo where it is confined to Sabah.

Microtropis keningauensis is a shrub or small tree.

It is restricted to the Ulu Sungai Milian Forest Reserve in Keningau District. It is an uncommon tree in lowland rain forest at approximately 440 metres elevation.
