= Microtropis platyphylla =

Conservation status
- Least Concern (IUCN 3.1)

Scientific classification
- Kingdom: Plantae
- Clade: Tracheophytes
- Clade: Angiosperms
- Clade: Eudicots
- Clade: Rosids
- Order: Celastrales
- Family: Celastraceae
- Genus: Microtropis
- Species: M. platyphylla

Binomial name
- Microtropis platyphylla Merr.

Synonyms
- Microtropis basilanensis Merr. & F.L.Freeman; Microtropis borneensis Merr. & F.L.Freeman; Microtropis chartacea Merr. & F.L.Freeman; Microtropis fasciculata Quisumb. & Merr.; Microtropis philippinensis Merr.; Microtropis rostrata Merr.; Microtropis rubra Elmer ex Merr. & F.L.Freeman

Species of plant

Microtropis platyphylla is a plant in the family Celastraceae. The specific epithet platyphylla means 'broad-leaved'.

== Description ==
Microtropis platyphylla grows as a shrub or tree up to 10 metres (30 ft) tall, with a diameter of up to 10 cm (4 in). The leathery leaves are ovate to lanceolate to elliptic and measure up to 24 cm (9 in) long, and up to 4.5 cm (1.8 in) wide. The inflorescences are in panicles.

== Distribution and habitat ==
Microtropis platyphylla is native to Borneo and the Philippines. Its Borneo habitat is in lowland to montane forests, to elevations of 2,700 m (9,000 ft). Its Philippines habitat is in lowland forests.

== Conservation ==
Microtropis platyphylla has been assessed as least concern on the IUCN Red List. It is threatened by conversion of its habitat for agriculture and urban development and also by logging and mining. The species is present in a number of protected areas, in Borneo: Crocker Range National Park, Maliau Basin and Tawau Hills National Park; in the Philippines: Upper Marikina River Basin Protected Landscape and Bulusan Volcano Natural Park.
