= Rhinacanthus scoparius =

Conservation status
- Least Concern (IUCN 3.1)

Scientific classification
- Kingdom: Plantae
- Clade: Tracheophytes
- Clade: Angiosperms
- Clade: Eudicots
- Clade: Asterids
- Order: Lamiales
- Family: Acanthaceae
- Genus: Rhinacanthus
- Species: R. scoparius

Binomial name
- Rhinacanthus scoparius Balf.f. (1883)

Species of plant

Rhinacanthus scoparius is a species of plant in the family Acanthaceae. It is a subshrub native to northeastern Somalia and to Yemen's Socotra island. On Socotra it is widespread on the coastal plains and limestone plateaus, growing in several shrubland types including Croton socotranus shrubland, succulent shrubland, and dwarf shrubland from 20 to 600 metres elevation.
