= Microtropis sumatrana =

Conservation status
- Least Concern (IUCN 3.1)

Scientific classification
- Kingdom: Plantae
- Clade: Tracheophytes
- Clade: Angiosperms
- Clade: Eudicots
- Clade: Rosids
- Order: Celastrales
- Family: Celastraceae
- Genus: Microtropis
- Species: M. sumatrana

Binomial name
- Microtropis sumatrana Merr.

Species of tree

Microtropis sumatrana is a tree in the family Celastraceae. It is named for Sumatra.

== Description ==
Microtropis sumatrana grows up to 20 m (70 ft) tall, with a trunk diameter of up to 20 cm (8 in). The smooth bark is grey. The leathery leaves are elliptic and measure up to 11 cm (4 in) long. The fruits measure up to 1.7 cm (0.7 in) long.

== Distribution and habitat ==
Microtropis sumatrana is native to Borneo and Sumatra. Its habitat is forests to elevations of 1,050 m (3,000 ft).
