= Microtropis densiflora =

Conservation status
- Endangered (IUCN 2.3)

Scientific classification
- Kingdom: Plantae
- Clade: Tracheophytes
- Clade: Angiosperms
- Clade: Eudicots
- Clade: Rosids
- Order: Celastrales
- Family: Celastraceae
- Genus: Microtropis
- Species: M. densiflora

Binomial name
- Microtropis densiflora Wight

Species of flowering plant

Microtropis densiflora is a species of plant in the family Celastraceae. It is endemic to Tamil Nadu in India.
