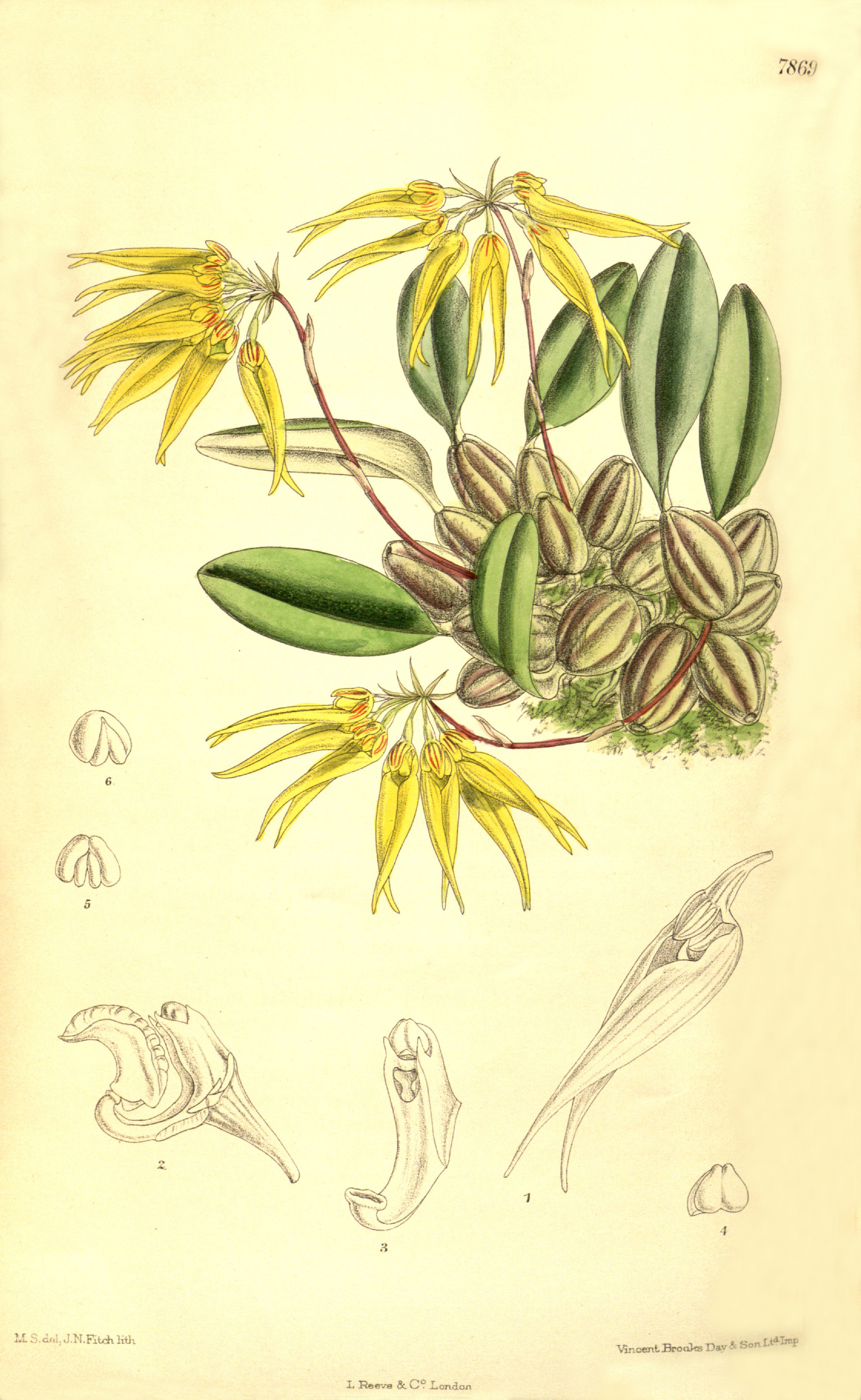

Scientific classification
- Kingdom: Plantae
- Clade: Tracheophytes
- Clade: Angiosperms
- Clade: Monocots
- Order: Asparagales
- Family: Orchidaceae
- Subfamily: Epidendroideae
- Genus: Bulbophyllum
- Species: B. muscicola

Binomial name
- Bulbophyllum muscicola Rchb.f.

= Bulbophyllum muscicola =

Species of orchid

Bulbophyllum muscicola is a species of orchid in the genus Bulbophyllum. It is native to the eastern Himalayan region, and the Asian tropics.
