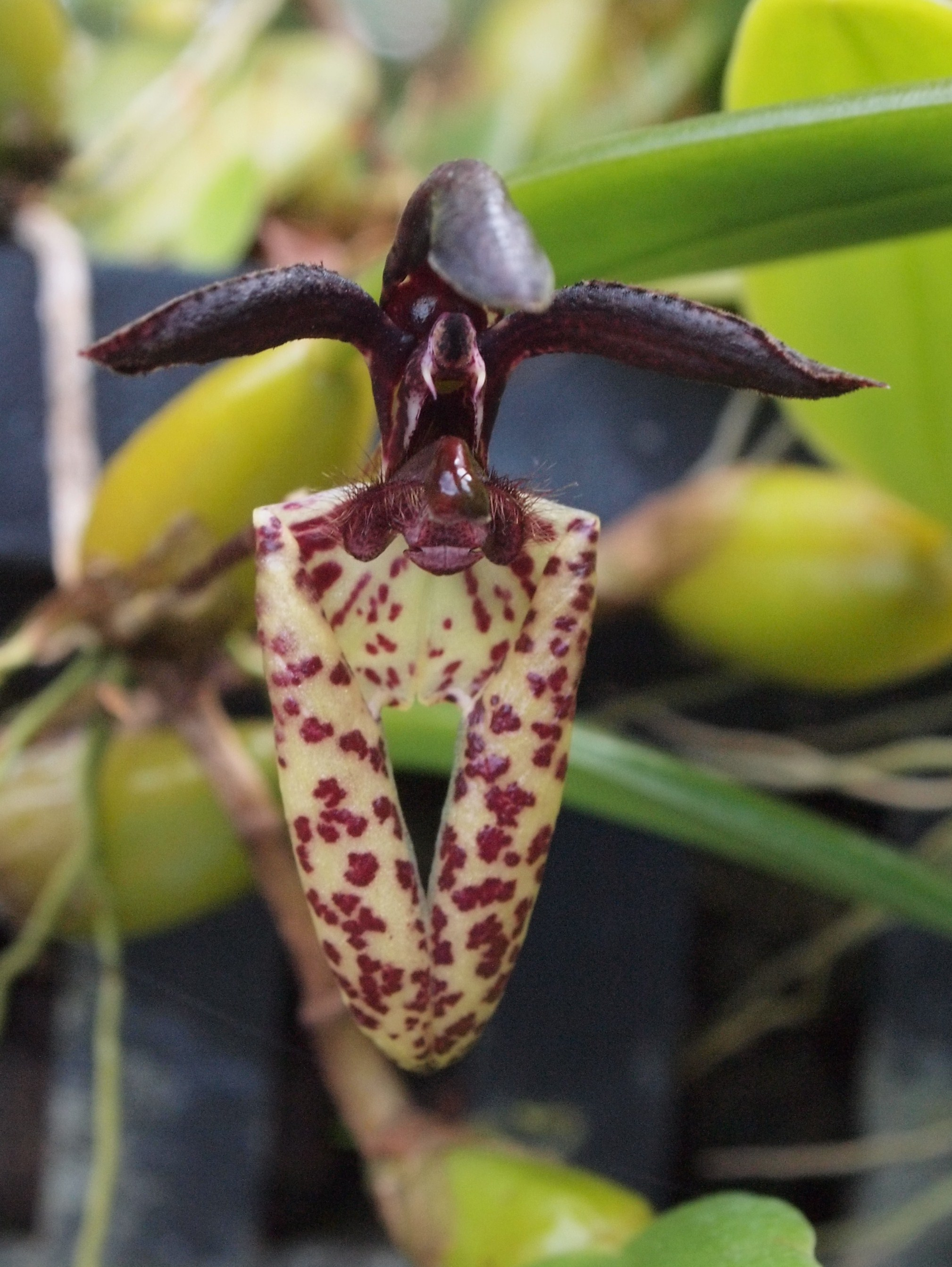

Scientific classification
- Kingdom: Plantae
- Clade: Embryophytes
- Clade: Tracheophytes
- Clade: Spermatophytes
- Clade: Angiosperms
- Clade: Monocots
- Order: Asparagales
- Family: Orchidaceae
- Subfamily: Epidendroideae
- Genus: Bulbophyllum
- Species: B. lasiochilum

Binomial name
- Bulbophyllum lasiochilum C. S. P. Parish & Rchb. f.

Synonyms
- Cirrhopetalum lasiochilum C. S. P. Parish & Rchb.f. (1874); Phyllorkis lasiochila (C. S. P. Parish & Rchb.f.) Kuntze (1891); Cirrhopetalum breviscapum Rolfe (1905); Bulbophyllum breviscapum (Rolfe) Ridl. (1907)

= Bulbophyllum lasiochilum =

Species of orchid

Bulbophyllum lasiochilum, commonly referred to as the shaggy lipped bulbophyllum, is a species of orchid in the genus Bulbophyllum. It is found in India, Myanmar, Thailand and Malaysia in wet or seasonally dry forests, and blooms in the fall.
