= Microtropis fascicularis =

Conservation status
- Vulnerable (IUCN 2.3)

Scientific classification
- Kingdom: Plantae
- Clade: Tracheophytes
- Clade: Angiosperms
- Clade: Eudicots
- Clade: Rosids
- Order: Celastrales
- Family: Celastraceae
- Genus: Microtropis
- Species: M. fascicularis

Binomial name
- Microtropis fascicularis Kochummen

Species of flowering plant

Microtropis fascicularis is a species of plant in the family Celastraceae. It is endemic to Borneo where it is confined to Sarawak. It is a deciduous shrub normally ranging in height from 1–5 m, though sometimes it can scramble higher into the crowns of taller trees. Its stems are covered with small, sharp, hooked spines, which aid it in climbing. The leaves are pinnate, with 5-7 leaflets. The flowers are usually pale pink, but can vary between a deep pink and white. They are 4–6 cm diameter with five petals, and mature into an oval 1.5–2 cm red-orange fruit.
