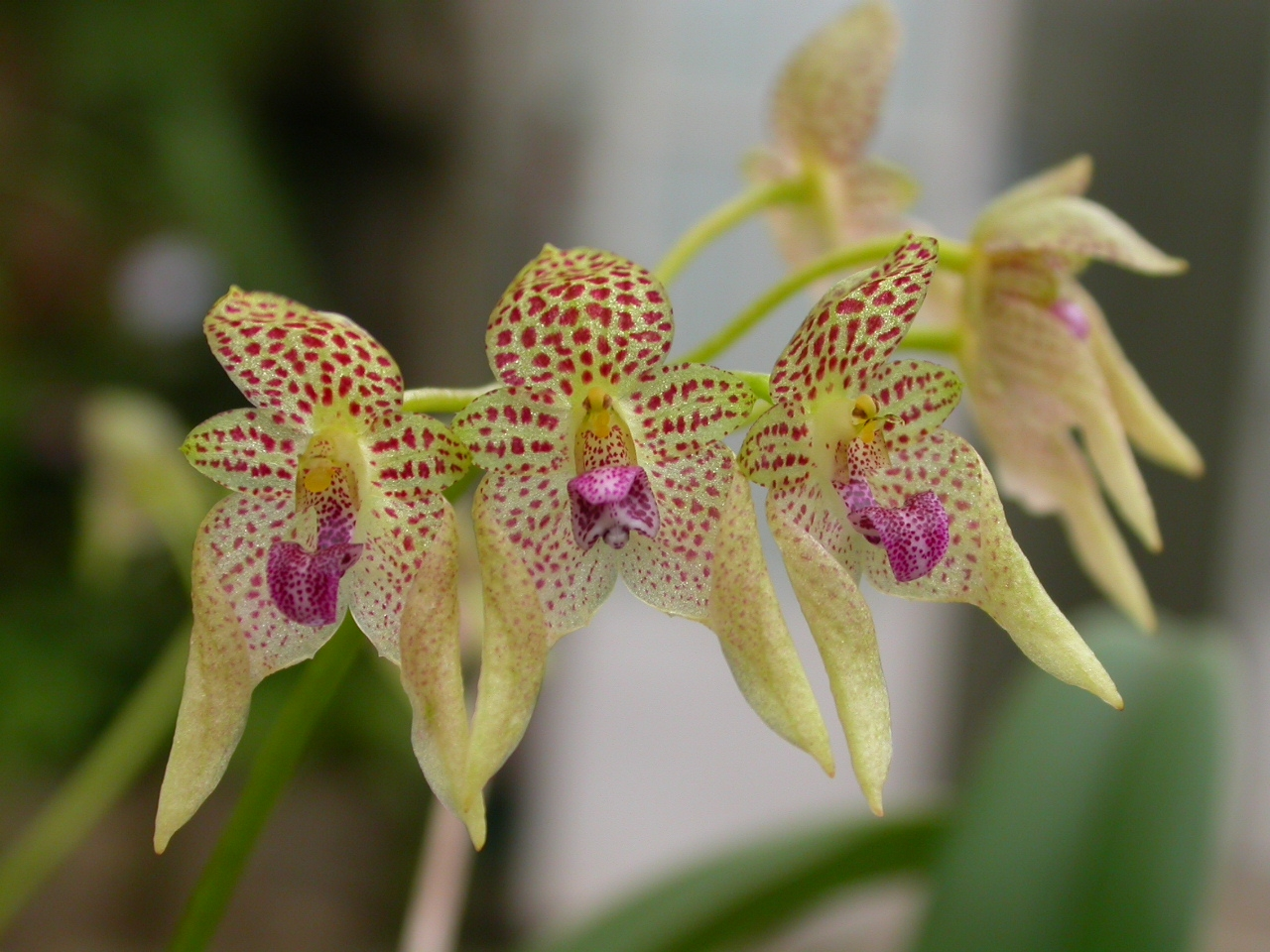

Scientific classification
- Kingdom: Plantae
- Clade: Tracheophytes
- Clade: Angiosperms
- Clade: Monocots
- Order: Asparagales
- Family: Orchidaceae
- Subfamily: Epidendroideae
- Genus: Bulbophyllum
- Species: B. guttulatum

Binomial name
- Bulbophyllum guttulatum (Hook.f.) N.P. Balakr. (1970)

Synonyms
- Phyllorkis guttulata (Hook.f.) Kuntze (1891); Cirrhopetalum guttulatum Hook.f. (1896) (Basionym)

= Bulbophyllum guttulatum =

Small-spotted bulbophyllum

Species of orchid

Bulbophyllum guttulatum, the small-spotted bulbophyllum, is a species of orchid.
