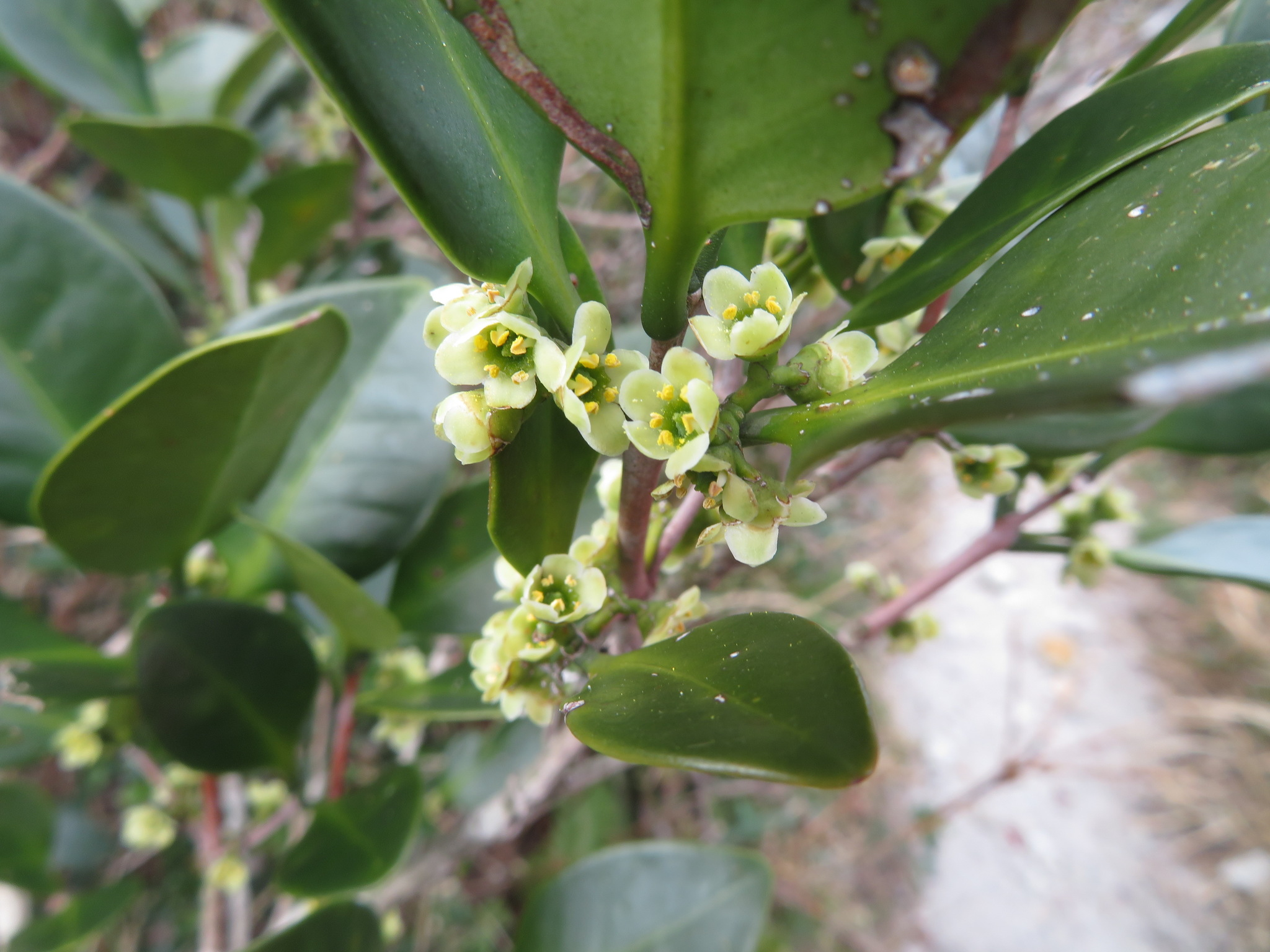
- Microtropis japonica in Japan

Scientific classification
- Kingdom: Plantae
- Clade: Tracheophytes
- Clade: Angiosperms
- Clade: Eudicots
- Clade: Rosids
- Order: Celastrales
- Family: Celastraceae
- Genus: Microtropis; Wall. ex Meisn.

Synonyms
- Chingithamnus Hand.-Mazz.; Otherodendron Makino; Paracelastrus Miq.

= Microtropis =

Genus of flowering plants

Microtropis is a genus of plant in the family Celastraceae. There are about 70 species. They are trees and shrubs, evergreen or deciduous, with oppositely arranged leaves and white or yellowish flowers. Microtropis are distributed in Asia, Africa, and Central America.

As of December 2023, Plants of the World Online accepted the following species:

- Microtropis apiculata Ding Hou
- Microtropis argentea Kochummen
- Microtropis beddomei Merr. & F.L.Freeman
- Microtropis biflora Merr. & F.L.Freeman
- Microtropis bivalvis (Jack) Wall.
- Microtropis cerocarpa Savinov & Nuraliev
- Microtropis chaffanjonii (H.Lév.) Y.F.Deng
- Microtropis chlorocarpa Merr. & F.L.Freeman
- Microtropis crassifolia Craib
- Microtropis curranii Merr.
- Microtropis daweishanensis Q.W.Lin & Z.X.Zhang
- Microtropis dehuaensis Z.S.Huang & Y.Y.Lin
- Microtropis discolor (Wall.) Wall. ex Meisn.
- Microtropis elliptica King
- Microtropis fallax Pit.
- Microtropis fascicularis Kochummen
- Microtropis fokienensis Dunn
- Microtropis gagei Merr. & F.L.Freeman
- Microtropis gracilipes Merr. & F.P.Metcalf
- Microtropis grandifolia Kochummen
- Microtropis henryi Merr. & F.L.Freeman
- Microtropis hexandra Merr. & F.L.Freeman
- Microtropis japonica (Franch. & Sav.) Hallier f.
- Microtropis keningauensis Kochummen
- Microtropis kinabaluensis Merr. & F.L.Freeman
- Microtropis lanceolata Boerl. & Koord.-Schum.
- Microtropis latifolia Wight ex M.A.Lawson
- Microtropis longicarpa Q.W.Lin & Z.X.Zhang
- Microtropis longifolia Wall. ex Kurz
- Microtropis macrocarpa C.Y.Cheng & T.C.Kao
- Microtropis malipoensis Y.M.Shui & W.H.Chen
- Microtropis microcarpa Wight
- Microtropis obliquinervia Merr. & F.L.Freeman
- Microtropis obscurinervia Merr. & F.L.Freeman
- Microtropis oligantha Merr. & F.L.Freeman
- Microtropis osmanthoides (Hand.-Mazz.) Hand.-Mazz.
- Microtropis ovata Merr. & F.L.Freeman
- Microtropis pallens Pierre
- Microtropis paucinervia Merr. & Chun ex Merr. & F.L.Freeman
- Microtropis petelotii Merr. & F.L.Freeman
- Microtropis platyphylla Merr.
- Microtropis pyramidalis C.Y.Cheng & T.C.Kao
- Microtropis ramiflora Wight
- Microtropis reticulata Dunn
- Microtropis rhynchocarpa Merr.
- Microtropis rigida Ridl.
- Microtropis sabahensis Kochummen
- Microtropis sarawakensis Kochummen
- Microtropis scottii R.Parker
- Microtropis semipaniculata C.Y.Cheng & T.C.Kao
- Microtropis shenzhenensis Lin Chen & F.W.Xing
- Microtropis sphaerocarpa C.Y.Cheng & T.C.Kao
- Microtropis stocksii Gamble
- Microtropis submembranacea Merr. & F.L.Freeman
- Microtropis sumatrana Merr.
- Microtropis tenuis Symington
- Microtropis tetragona Merr. & F.L.Freeman
- Microtropis tetrameris Ding Hou
- Microtropis thyrsiflora C.Y.Cheng & T.C.Kao
- Microtropis triflora Merr. & F.L.Freeman
- Microtropis valida Ridl.
- Microtropis wallichiana Wight ex Thwaites
- Microtropis wui Y.M.Shui & W.H.Chen
- Microtropis xizangensis Q.W.Lin & Z.X.Zhang
- Microtropis zeylanica Merr. & F.L.Freeman
