= Bulbophyllum kontumense =

Scientific classification
- Kingdom: Plantae
- Clade: Tracheophytes
- Clade: Angiosperms
- Clade: Monocots
- Order: Asparagales
- Family: Orchidaceae
- Subfamily: Epidendroideae
- Genus: Bulbophyllum
- Species: B. kontumense

Binomial name
- Bulbophyllum kontumense Gagnep.

Species of orchid

Bulbophyllum kontumense is a flowering plant in the family Orchidaceae that is endemic to Vietnam.
