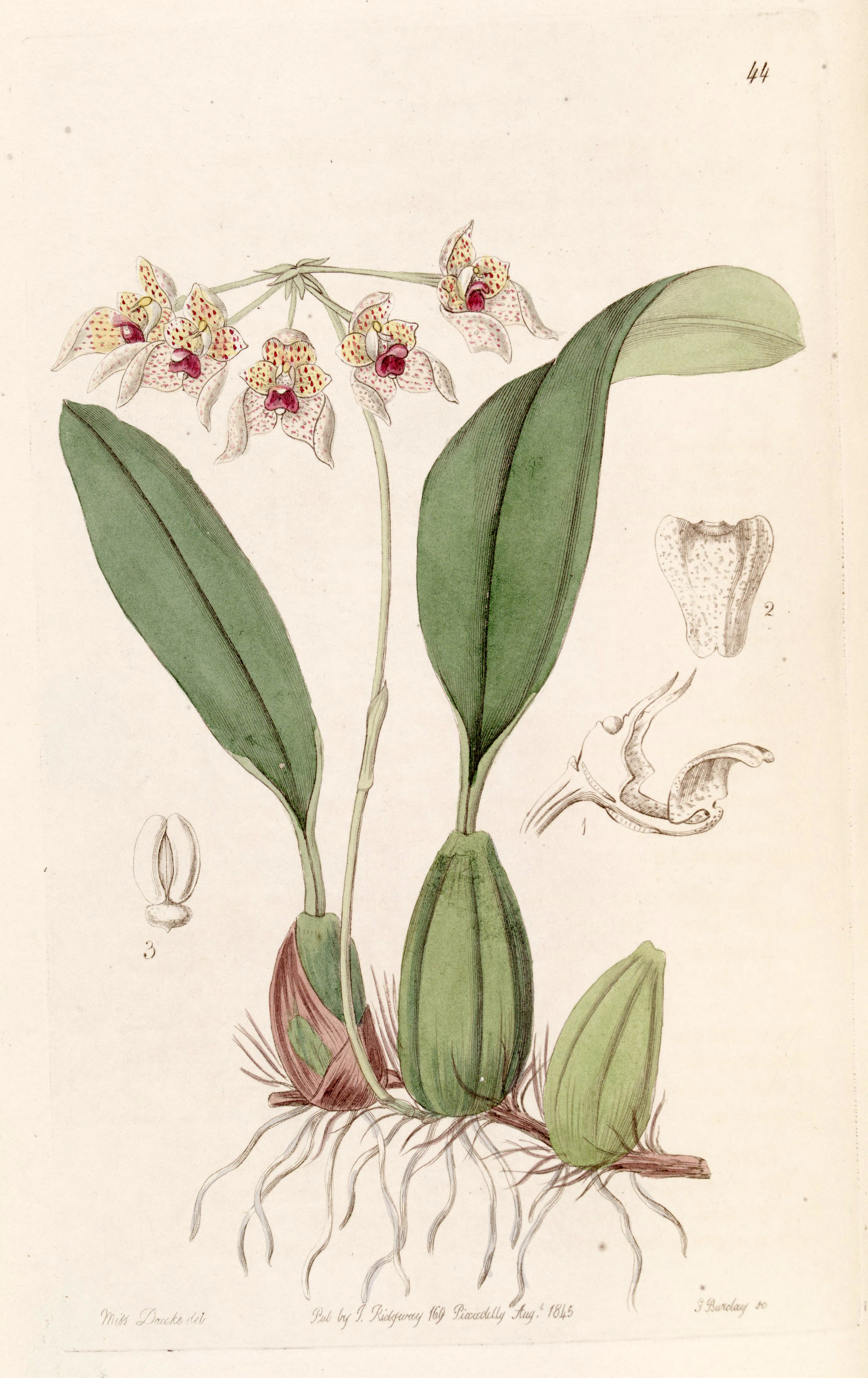

Scientific classification
- Kingdom: Plantae
- Clade: Tracheophytes
- Clade: Angiosperms
- Clade: Monocots
- Order: Asparagales
- Family: Orchidaceae
- Subfamily: Epidendroideae
- Genus: Bulbophyllum
- Species: B. umbellatum

Binomial name
- Bulbophyllum umbellatum Lindl.

Synonyms
- Cirrhopetalum umbellatum (Lindl.) Linden, nom. illeg.; Phyllorkis umbellata (Lindl.) Kuntze

= Bulbophyllum umbellatum =

Umbrella Bulbophyllum

Species of orchid

Bulbophyllum umbellatum (umbrella bulbophyllum) is a species of orchid. It is native to tropical parts of South Asia, from the west central Himalayas to Taiwan and Indo-China.

== Varieties ==
As of December 2023, Plants of the World Online accepted two varieties:

- Bulbophyllum umbellatum var. fuscescens (Hook.f.) P.K.Sarkar
- Bulbophyllum umbellatum var. umbellatum, many synonyms including Cirrhopetalum maculosum

Cirrhopetalanthrin is a dimeric phenanthrene derivative from B. umbellatum var. umbellatum.
