= Bulbophyllum spathulatum =

Scientific classification
- Kingdom: Plantae
- Clade: Tracheophytes
- Clade: Angiosperms
- Clade: Monocots
- Order: Asparagales
- Family: Orchidaceae
- Subfamily: Epidendroideae
- Genus: Bulbophyllum
- Species: B. spathulatum

Binomial name
- Bulbophyllum spathulatum (Rolfe ex E. Cooper) Seidenf.

Species of orchid

Bulbophyllum spathulatum is a species of orchid in the genus Bulbophyllum. The plant is characterized by miniature flowers about 8x4 cm in size, and are a purplish red color. This plant is typically found in tropical climates at elevations of 1,000 to 2,000 meters, particularly in Asia.
