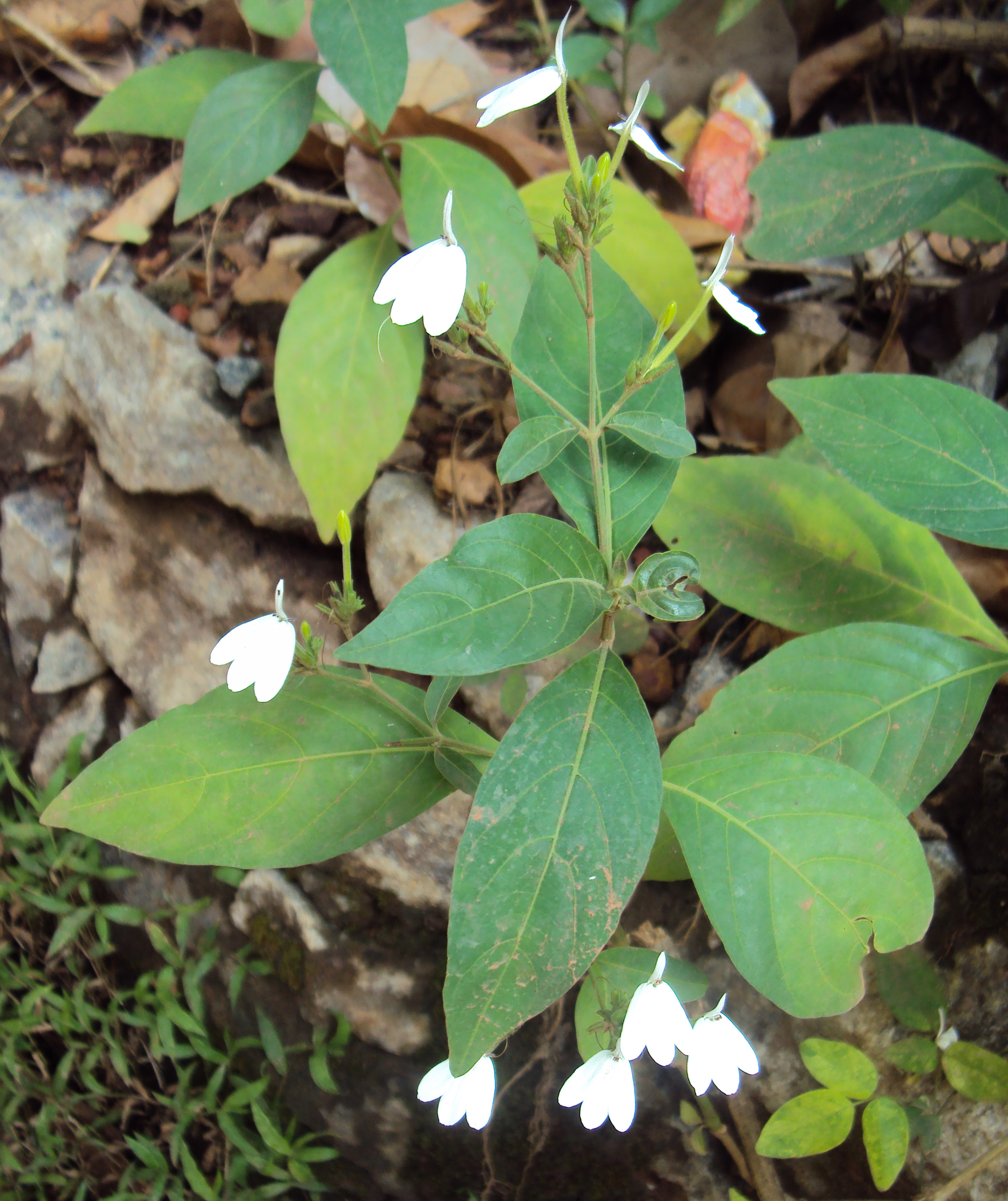

Scientific classification
- Kingdom: Plantae
- Clade: Tracheophytes
- Clade: Angiosperms
- Clade: Eudicots
- Clade: Asterids
- Order: Lamiales
- Family: Acanthaceae
- Genus: Rhinacanthus
- Species: R. nasutus

Binomial name
- Rhinacanthus nasutus (L.) Kurz

Varieties
- Rhinacanthus nasutus var. montanus (C.B.Clarke) N.P.Balakr.; Rhinacanthus nasutus var. nasutus

Synonyms
- Justicia nasuta L.; Rhinacanthus communis Nees; synonyms of var. montanus: Rhinacanthus communis var. montanus C.B.Clarke; synonyms of var. nasutus: Dianthera paniculata Lour., nom. illeg. homonym. post.; Justicia dichotoma Rottler; Justicia gendarussa Macrae ex Nees; Justicia rottleriana Wall.; Justicia silvatica Nees; Justicia sylvatica Vahl; Pseuderanthemum connatum Lindau; Rhinacanthus rottlerianus Nees

= Rhinacanthus nasutus =

Species of flowering plant

Rhinacanthus nasutus, commonly known as snake jasmine, is a plant native to tropical Asia – India, Bangladesh, Sri Lanka, Indochina, Peninsular Malaysia, and the Philippines. It is a slender, erect, branched, somewhat hairy shrub 1–2 m in height. The leaves are oblong, 4–10 cm in length, and narrowed and pointed at both ends. The inflorescence is a spreading, leafy, hairy panicle with the flowers usually in clusters. The calyx is green, hairy, and about 5 mm long. The corolla-tube is greenish, slender, cylindric, and about 2 cm long. The flowers is 2-lipped; the upper lip is white, erect, oblong or lancelike, 2-toothed at the apex, and about 3 mm in both length and width; and the lower lip is broadly obovate, 1.1-1.3 cm in both measurements, 3-lobed, and white, with a few, minute, brownish dots near the base. The fruit (capsule) is club-shaped and contains 4 seeds.

Two varieties are accepted:

- Rhinacanthus nasutus var. montanus (C.B.Clarke) N.P.Balakr. – southern India
- Rhinacanthus nasutus var. nasutus – India, Bangladesh, Sri Lanka, Indochina, Peninsular Malaysia, and the Philippines

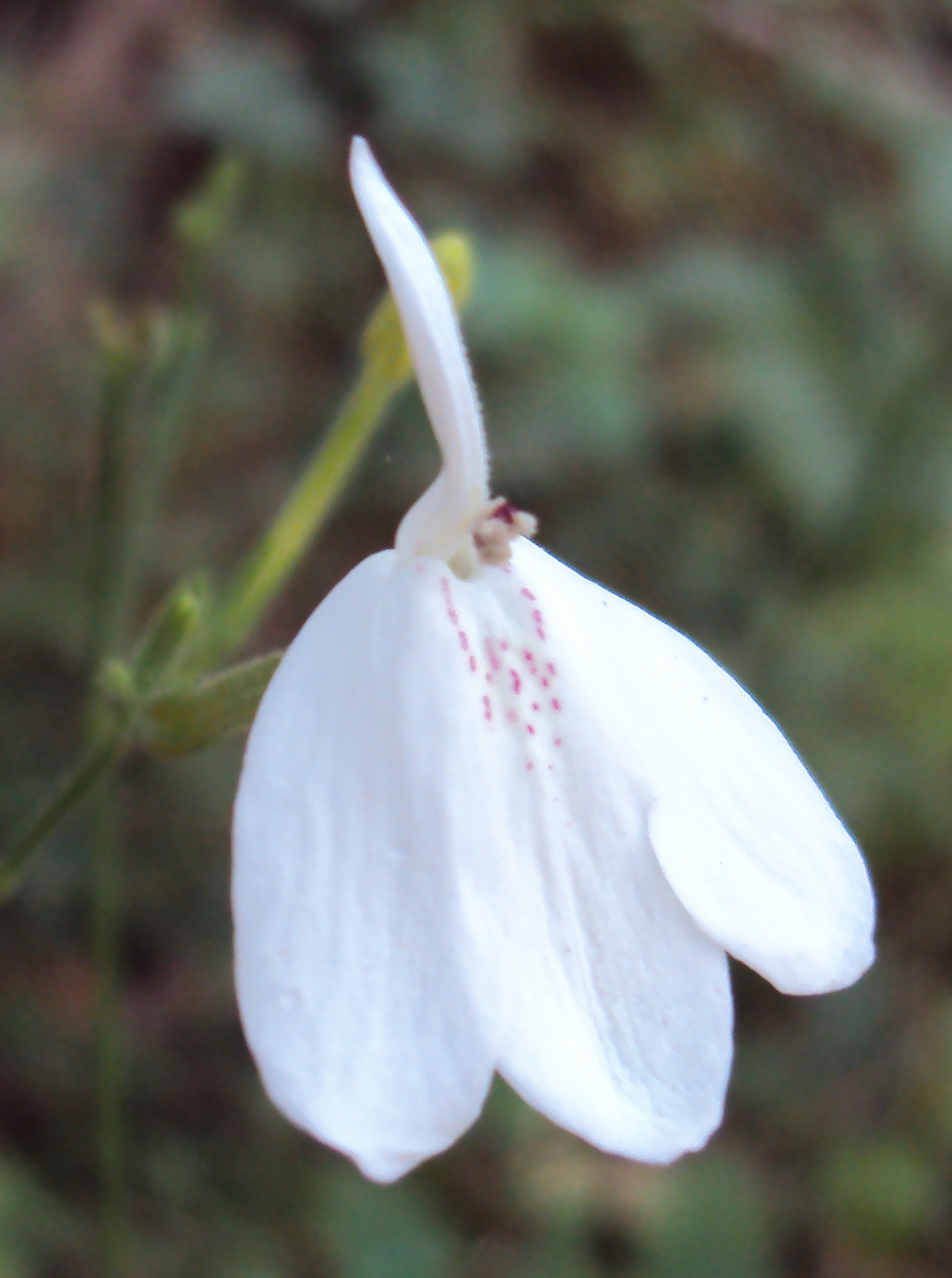
Flower

== Uses ==
It has been used in the treatment of snake bites.
