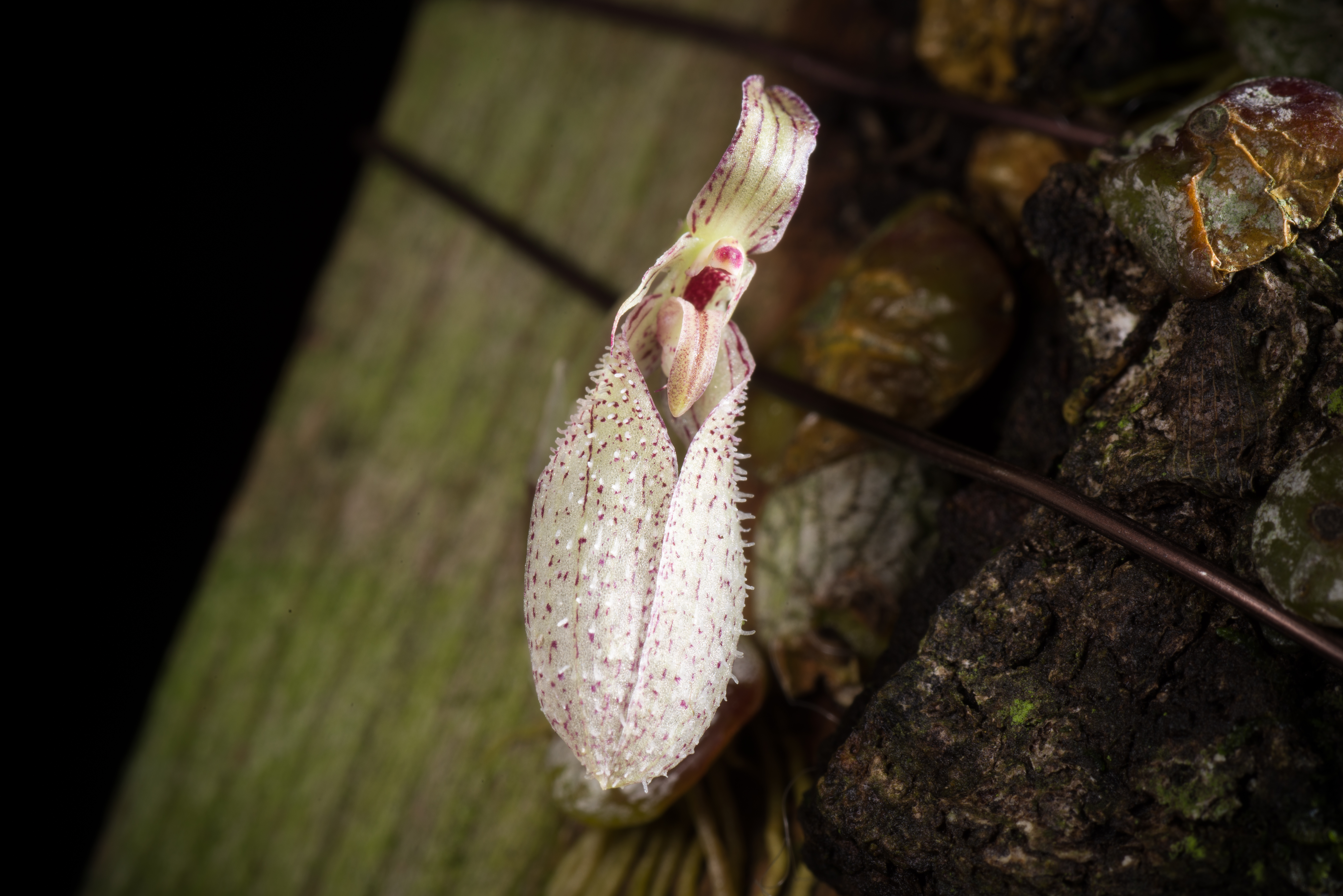

Scientific classification
- Kingdom: Plantae
- Clade: Tracheophytes
- Clade: Angiosperms
- Clade: Monocots
- Order: Asparagales
- Family: Orchidaceae
- Subfamily: Epidendroideae
- Genus: Bulbophyllum
- Species: B. polliculosum

Binomial name
- Bulbophyllum polliculosum Seidenf.

= Bulbophyllum polliculosum =

Species of orchid

Bulbophyllum polliculosum is a species of orchid in the genus Bulbophyllum. The plant carries deciduous leaves which fall off in the winter.
