= Bulbophyllum orezii =

Scientific classification
- Kingdom: Plantae
- Clade: Tracheophytes
- Clade: Angiosperms
- Clade: Monocots
- Order: Asparagales
- Family: Orchidaceae
- Subfamily: Epidendroideae
- Genus: Bulbophyllum
- Species: B. orezii

Binomial name
- Bulbophyllum orezii Sath. Kumar 2004

Synonyms
- Bulbophyllum josephi M.Kumar & Sequiera 2001

Species of orchid

Bulbophyllum orezii is a species of orchid in the genus Bulbophyllum found in Kerala, India at elevations of 900-1000 meters. Plants are epiphytic.
