= Bulbophyllum sphaericum =

Scientific classification
- Kingdom: Plantae
- Clade: Tracheophytes
- Clade: Angiosperms
- Clade: Monocots
- Order: Asparagales
- Family: Orchidaceae
- Subfamily: Epidendroideae
- Genus: Bulbophyllum
- Species: B. sphaericum

Binomial name
- Bulbophyllum sphaericum Z. H. Tsi & H. Li

Species of orchid

Bulbophyllum sphaericum is a species of orchid in the genus Bulbophyllum. It is found in Sichuan and Yunnan, providence of China. The Bulbophyllum sphaericum is a warm to cool growing epiphyte with a creeping, branching rhizome with .4" [1 cm] between each globose pseudobulb carrying a single, apical, thickly leathery, elliptic-oblong, abaxially purplish red, adaxially pale green, margin slightly recurved, retuse apically, sessile base leaf that blooms in the summer on an erect, basal from the pseudobulb, much longer than the leaf, 4 to 5 flowered inflorescence holding the flowers in an apical umbel.
