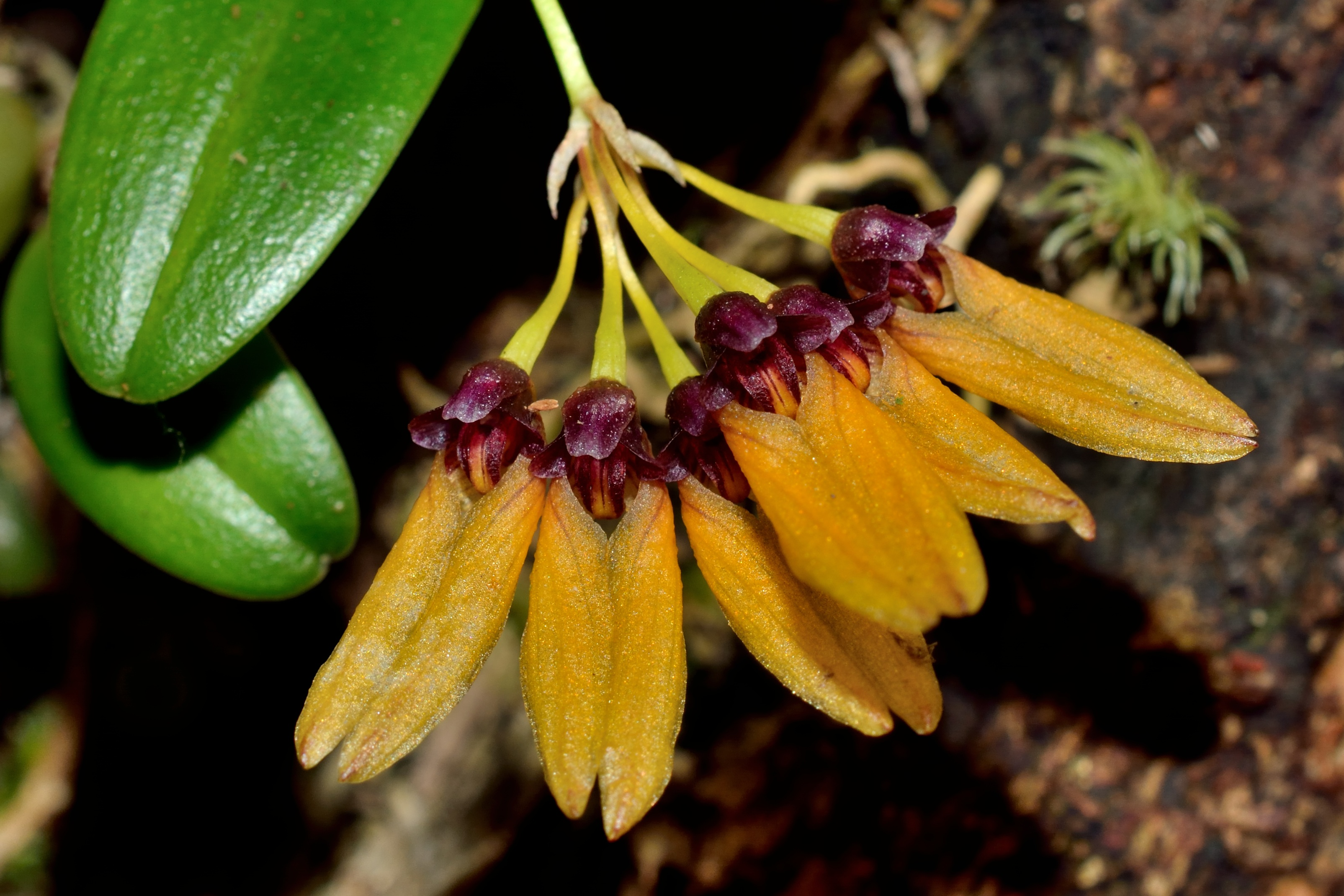

Scientific classification
- Kingdom: Plantae
- Clade: Tracheophytes
- Clade: Angiosperms
- Clade: Monocots
- Order: Asparagales
- Family: Orchidaceae
- Subfamily: Epidendroideae
- Genus: Bulbophyllum
- Species: B. retusiusculum

Binomial name
- Bulbophyllum retusiusculum Rchb.f.

Synonyms
- Cirrhopetalum retusiusculum (Rchb.f.) Hook.f. (1890; Phyllorkis retusiuscula (Rchb.f.) Kuntze 1891; Bulbophyllum flavisepalum Hayata 1912; Bulbophyllum langbianense Seidenf. & Smitinand 1965; Bulbophyllum micholitzii (Rolfe) J.J.Sm. 1912; Bulbophyllum oreogenes (W.W.Sm.) Seidenf. 1973 publ. 1974; Bulbophyllum retusiusculum f. brunneum N.H.Tuan & O.Gruss 2019; Bulbophyllum retusiusculum f. flavum N.H.Tuan, O.Gruss & D.H.Le 2019; Bulbophyllum retusiusculum var. oreogenes (W.W.Sm.) Z.H.Tsi 1995; Cirrhopetalum flavisepalum (Hayata) Hayata 1917; Cirrhopetalum micholitzii Rolfe 1912; Cirrhopetalum oreogenes W.W.Sm. 1921; Cirrhopetalum touranense Gagnep. 1931; Cirrhopetalum touranense var. breviflorum Gagnep. 1931

= Bulbophyllum retusiusculum =

Species of orchid

Bulbophyllum retusiusculum is a species of orchid in the genus Bulbophyllum.

== Description ==
Bulbophyllum retusiusculum is a warm-growing orchid has lithophytic or epiphytic habits, featuring a creeping branched rhizome with 1-3 cm separations between each falcate pseudobulb. The pseudobulbs are slender, suberect to oblique, and narrowly ovate-conical, each bearing a single apical, leathery, linear-oblong leaf that is erect to suberect and semi-flexible to rigid and 1.6-8 cm long. It flowers in summer and autumn with a 14 cm long basal inflorescence, which can be ascending or descending, bearing 6 to 12 umbel-shaped flowers with tubular, narrowly lanceolate bracts.

Close up of labellum

Flowers

== Distribution ==
Bulbophyllum retusiusculum is found in lowland evergreen forests and primary montane forests at elevations of 500 to 3000 meters in China (Gansu, Guizhou, Hainan, Hubei, Hunan, Sichuan, Xizang, Yunnan), Nepal, India (Assam and Sikkim), Bhutan, Burma, Thailand, Malaysia, Laos, Vietnam, and Taiwan.

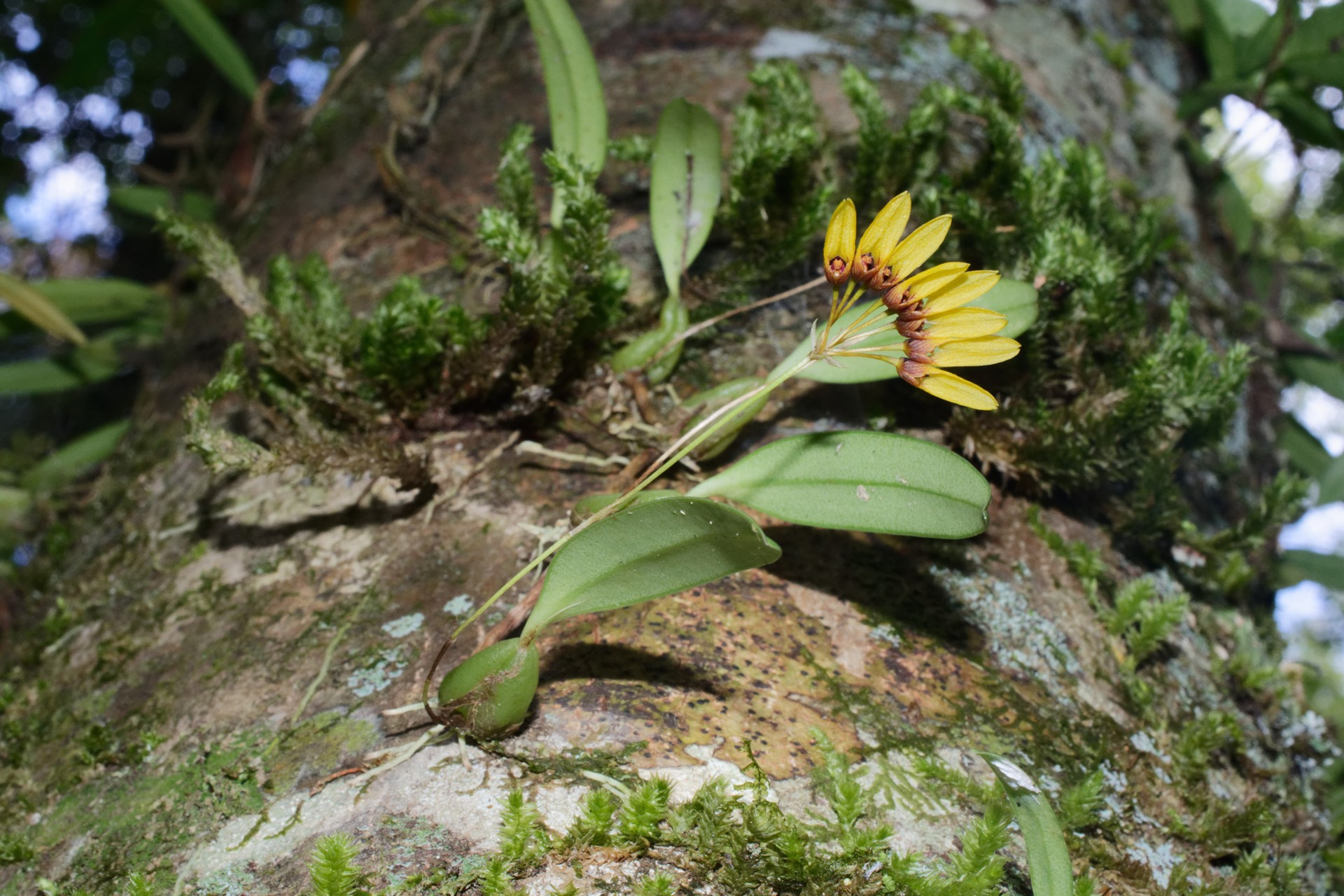
Plant growing epiphytically

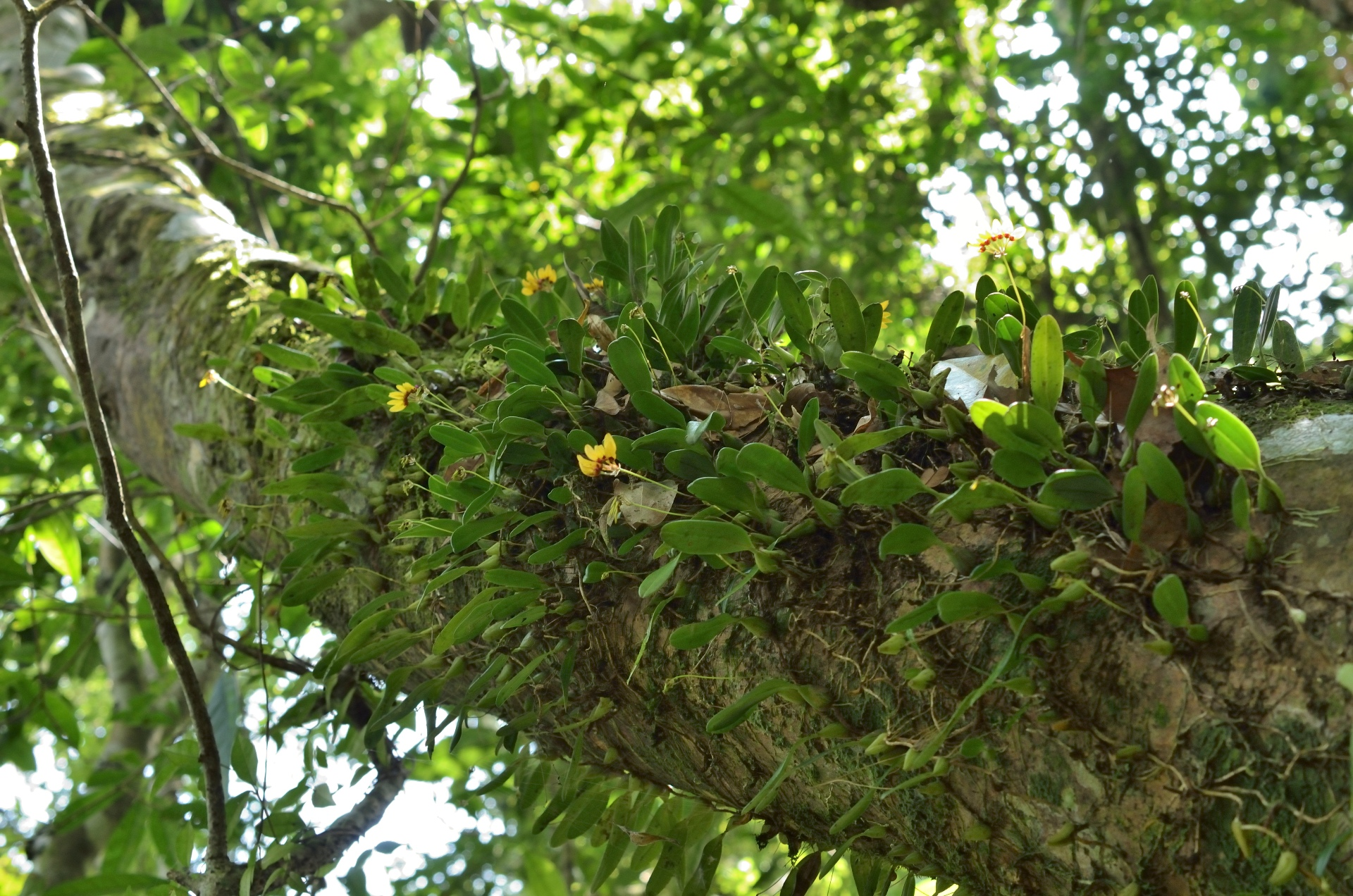

== Taxonomy ==
Heinrich Gustav Reichenbach described Bulbophyllum retusiusculum in The Gardeners' Chronicle & Agricultural Gazette in 1869.
