= Bulbophyllum fibratum =

Scientific classification
- Kingdom: Plantae
- Clade: Tracheophytes
- Clade: Angiosperms
- Clade: Monocots
- Order: Asparagales
- Family: Orchidaceae
- Subfamily: Epidendroideae
- Genus: Bulbophyllum
- Species: B. fibratum

Binomial name
- Bulbophyllum fibratum (Gagnep.) Seidenf.

Synonyms
- Cirrhopetalum fibratum Gagnep.; Cirrhopetalum wallichii J.Graham

Species of orchid

Bulbophyllum fibratum is flowering plant in the family Orchidaceae.
