= Bulbophyllum funingense =

Scientific classification
- Kingdom: Plantae
- Clade: Embryophytes
- Clade: Tracheophytes
- Clade: Spermatophytes
- Clade: Angiosperms
- Clade: Monocots
- Order: Asparagales
- Family: Orchidaceae
- Subfamily: Epidendroideae
- Genus: Bulbophyllum
- Species: B. funingense

Binomial name
- Bulbophyllum funingense Z. H. Tsi & H. C. Chen

Species of orchid

Bulbophyllum funingense is a species of orchid in the genus Bulbophyllum.
