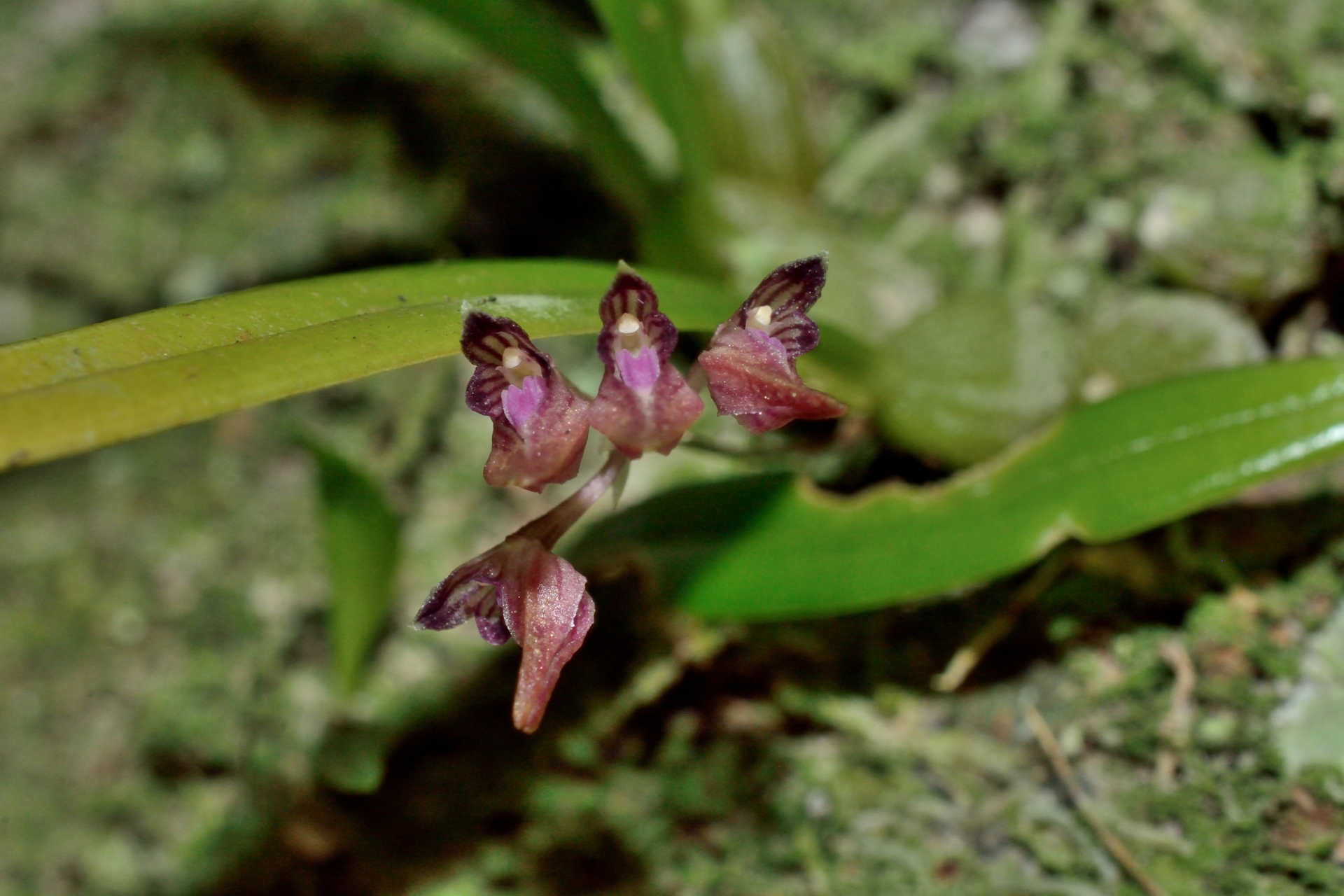

Scientific classification
- Kingdom: Plantae
- Clade: Tracheophytes
- Clade: Angiosperms
- Clade: Monocots
- Order: Asparagales
- Family: Orchidaceae
- Subfamily: Epidendroideae
- Genus: Bulbophyllum
- Species: B. japonicum

Binomial name
- Bulbophyllum japonicum (Makino) Makino

Synonyms
- Homotypic Synonyms: Cirrhopetalum japonicum Makino; Heterotypic Synonyms: Bulbophyllum inabae Hayata; Bulbophyllum japonicum f. lutescens (Murata) Masam. & Satomi; Cirrhopetalum inabae (Hayata) Hayata; Cirrhopetalum japonicum var. lutescens Murata

= Bulbophyllum japonicum =

Species of orchid

Bulbophyllum japonicum is a species of orchid in the family Orchidaceae. It is native to Southeast China, Japan and Taiwan.
