= Stephen Troyte Dunn =

British botanist

- Born: August 26, 1868; Bristol, England
- Died: April 18, 1938 (aged 69); Sheen, Surrey, England
- Education: Merton College, Oxford
- Known for: Description of Bauhinia blakeana; taxonomy of Chinese flora; compiling Index Kewensis
- Scientific career
- Fields: Botany, Plant taxonomy
- Workplaces: Royal Botanic Gardens, Kew; Department of Botany and Forestry, Hong Kong
- Author abbrev. (botany): Dunn

Stephen Troyte Dunn (26 August 1868, Bristol - 18 April, 1938, Sheen, Surrey, England) was a British botanist. He described and systematized a significant number of plants around the world, his input most noticeable in the taxonomy of the flora of China. Among the plants he first scientifically described was Bauhinia blakeana, now the national flower of Hong Kong.

== Biography ==
Born in Bristol in the family of Rev. James Dunn, of Northern Irish descent, S. T. Dunn was educated at Radley, and at Merton College, Oxford, where he earned his BA in classics.

He was private secretary to liberal politician Thomas Acland in 1897, and the next year (as in 1898 Thomas Acland died) he first joined Kew as private secretary to the director, W. T. Thiselton-Dyer. He was then assistant for India in the herbarium from 1901 until his departure for Hong Kong in 1903. At Kew prior to this, he worked on compiling the second supplement of Index Kewensis which was issued in 1904–1905.

While superintendent at the Department of Botany and Forestry, Hong Kong (1903–1910), Stephen Dunn would go on expeditions and make many collections in Asia, including Taiwan, Guangdong province and Fujian Province, as well as in Korea and Japan. He was especially interested in ferns.

After returning to England, he became an official guide at Kew in 1913, but left Britain again in 1915 for America. Returning four years later, he went back to the Kew Herbarium, where he remained until his retirement in 1928.

Among his published works were many articles on the Chinese flora as well as the flora of Britain. He was a regular contributor to the Journal of the Linnean Society.

== Legacy ==
(not to be confused with Dunn in zoology, where it refers to herpetologist Emmett Reid Dunn)

Colleague William James Tutcher named Amorphophallus dunnii and Illicium dunnianum after him.

== Family ==
He married firstly Maud, youngest daughter of Rev. W. H. Thornton, rector of North Bovey, Devon on the 17th of April 1901 in St. Barnabas' Church, Pimlico, London. She took keen interest in botany as well. Maudiae was the word used by S. T. Dunn in her honor when naming magnolia Michelia maudiae Dunn.
He married secondly Eila Foster, daughter of Henry Oldham Foster & His wife Johanna Christina Hermina née Keuchenius in 1901 at London, England.

== Works ==
- Stephen Troyte Dunn, William James Tutcher. Flora of Kwangtung and Hong Kong (China) being an account of the flowering plants, ferns and fern allies together with keys for their determination preceded by a map and introduction. London: H. M. Stationery off., printed by Darling and son, ltd., 1912. PDF
- Stephen Troyte Dunn. A supplementary list of Chinese flowering plants, 1904-1910. London, 1911. PDF
- Stephen Troyte Dunn. Alien flora of Britain. West, Newman, and Co., 1905
- Stephen Troyte Dunn. Descriptions of New Chinese Plants. 1904.
- C.H. Wright, Charles Geekie Matthew, Stephen Troyte Dunn. Flora of the Falkland Islands. London: Linnean Society, 1911.
- James Sykes Gamble, Stephen Troyte Dunn, Cecil Ernest Claude Fischer. Flora of the Presidency of Madras. Botanical Survey of India, 1967.
- Stephen Troyte Dunn. A Key to the Labiatae of China. London: Her Majesty's Stationery Office, 1915.
- Chapter "Flora" in Twentieth Century Impressions of Hong Kong, Shanghai, and other Treaty Ports of China. Their History, People, Commerce, Industries, and Resources. Lloyd's (London), 1908.
- S. T. Dunn (1908). "New Chinese Plants". Journal of Botany, British and Foreign. 46 (550): 324–326., Page 325 (re Bauhinia × blakeana)
