= Sessilifolia =

Sessilifolia is a specific epithet and may refer to:

- Aglaia sessilifolia, Borneo
- Axinaea sessilifolia, Ecuador
- Diervilla sessilifolia, United States
- Drosera sessilifolia, South America
- Horsfieldia sessilifolia, Malaysia
- Renealmia sessilifolia, Ecuador
- Salix sessilifolia, North America
- Uvularia sessilifolia, North America
