= Aglaia leptantha =

Conservation status
- Near Threatened (IUCN 2.3)

Scientific classification
- Kingdom: Plantae
- Clade: Embryophytes
- Clade: Tracheophytes
- Clade: Angiosperms
- Clade: Eudicots
- Clade: Rosids
- Order: Sapindales
- Family: Meliaceae
- Genus: Aglaia
- Species: A. leptantha

Binomial name
- Aglaia leptantha Miq.

Synonyms
- Aglaia annamensis Pellegr.; Aglaia gamopetala Merr.; Aglaia glabriflora Hiern; Aglaia glabrifolia Merr.; Aglaia laevigata Merr.

Species of tree from Southeast Asia

Aglaia leptantha is a species of tree in the family Meliaceae. It is found in Mainland and Island Southeast Asia. People use the plant for food, incense, and for human and bovine medicine. Gibbons also eat parts of the tree.

== Description ==
A tree growing some 20–35 m (66–115 ft) tall. The wood is red. Distinguishing traits include that the secondary veins on the leaves are usually less than ten, though rarely more, and that the leaflets dry to a blackish to blackish-green colour. In Thailand the tree flowers from August to October, with fruiting occurring from October to April.

== Distribution ==
The species is found in Mainland and Island Southeast Asia. Countries and regions that it is native to are: Indonesia (Nusa Tenggara, Kalimantan, Sumatera); Philippines; Malaysia (Sabah, Sarawak, Peninsular Malaysia); Thailand; Cambodia; Vietnam; and Laos.

== Habitat and ecology ==
Occurs in many forest habitats and in seasonal swamps.

In upland Cavite (Luzon, Philippines) the natural forest, a lowland evergreen dipterocarp rainforest, is under threat from deforestation, mining and pollution. The dominant trees are Shorea guiso, Ficus chrysolepis, Diospyros pyrrhocarpa, Buchanania arborescens and Strombosia philippinensis. A. leptantha is a minor taxa (less than 1% importance value) in this forest.

In Thailand it is recorded in evergreen forests, growing in sediments derived from sandstone, limestone or granite bedrock, at 500–1,100 m (1,600–3,600 ft) altitude.

In Cambodia and Vietnam it is restricted to montane forests.

Local people in the Veun Sai-Siem Pang Conservation Area, northeastern Cambodia, have observed Northern yellow-cheeked crested gibbons (Nomascus annamensis) eating parts of A. leptantha.

== Conservation ==
The species is considered Lower Risk/Near Threatened by the IUCN Red List mainly because of the threat of habitat loss.

== Vernacular names ==
- sang khriat lueat (สังเครียดเลือด) (Thailand)
- sang ka tong (สังกะโต้ง) (Peninsular Thailand)
- sdau phnôm (sdau="Azadirachta indica", phnôm="mountain", Khmer language)
- sdau ânluëk (ânluëk="vegetables", Khmer)
- santal rouge de Cochinchinense (="red sandalwood of Cochinchina", French)

== Uses ==
In Thailand the aril is eaten. In Cambodia the young leaves are eaten in salads, like those of the genuine sdau (Azadirachta indica). The red wood is fragrant and used as incense, like sandalwood (Santalum spp.) A decoction of the bark is used in local medicine to treat fever in people and to increase the appetite of oxen and buffalo.

== History ==
The species was first described in 1868 by the Nederlander botanist Friedrich Anton Wilhelm Miquel (1811–1871). After an early career as a medical doctor and academic, he became a leading expert on the botany of the then Nederlands West Indies, now Indonesia. He published his description in Annales Musei Botanici Lugduno-Batavi (Amsterdam).
