= List of endemic plants of Tonga =

Tonga is an archipelago and island nation in the South Pacific. It is home to 30 endemic species and subspecies of vascular plants.

Plants are listed alphabetically by plant family. Extinct and presumed extinct species are indicated with †.

== Annonaceae ==
- Meiogyne amicorum (A.C.Sm.) B.Xue & R.M.K.Saunders

== Arecaceae ==
- Pritchardia pacifica Seem. & H.Wendl. – Vava'u

== Aspleniaceae ==
- Thelypteris macroptera (Copel.) C.F.Reed – 'Eua

== Dennstaedtiaceae ==
- Dennstaedtia parksii Copel. ex Morton – Tongatapu and 'Eua

== Goodeniaceae ==
- Scaevola porrecta A.C.Sm.

== Lamiaceae ==
- Phyllostegia tongaensis H.St.John – 'Ata I.

== Malvaceae ==
- Grewia amicorum Steud.
- Grewia populoides Burret

== Meliaceae ==
- Aglaia heterotricha A.C.Sm. – 'Eua
- Didymocheton tongensis (A.C.Sm.) Holzmeyer & Hauenschild – 'Eua

== Monimiaceae ==
- Hedycarya alternifolia Hemsl. – 'Eua

== Orchidaceae ==
- Robiquetia tongaensis P.J.Cribb & Ormerod – Tongatapu and 'Eua

== Pandanaceae ==
- Pandanus amicalis H.St.John
- Pandanus tongatapuensis H.St.John
- Pandanus vavauensis H.St.John

== Phyllanthaceae ==
- Phyllanthus amicorum G.L.Webster

== Pittosporaceae ==
- Pittosporum yunckeri A.C.Sm.

== Plantaginaceae ==
- Plantago euana Hürl. – 'Eua

== Podocarpaceae ==
- Podocarpus pallidus N.E.Gray – 'Eua, Vava'u

== Rhamnaceae ==
- Alphitonia franguloides var. obtusa A.Gray

== Rubiaceae ==
- Atractocarpus crosbyi (Burkill) Puttock – Vava'u
- Ixora yunckeri A.C.Sm. – 'Eua
- Oldenlandia debilis G.Forst.
- Psychotria euaensis M.Hotta
- Psychotria kaoensis A.C.Sm. – Kao

== Salicaceae ==
- Casearia buelowii Whistler – Vava'u
- Xylosma smithiana Fosberg – Tongatabu

== Sapindaceae ==
- Arytera bifoliata Whistler
- Guioa lentiscifolia Cav.

== Selaginellaceae ==
- Selaginella yunckeri Alston – Kao
