= Aglaia brassii =

- Kew Gardens specimen K001590177

Conservation status
- Least Concern (IUCN 3.1)

Scientific classification
- Kingdom: Plantae
- Clade: Tracheophytes
- Clade: Angiosperms
- Clade: Eudicots
- Clade: Rosids
- Order: Sapindales
- Family: Meliaceae
- Genus: Aglaia
- Species: A. brassii

Binomial name
- Aglaia brassii Merr. & L.M.Perry

Species of flowering plant

Aglaia brassii is a species of plant in the family Meliaceae native to New Guinea, the Solomon Islands and the Australian state of Queensland. It was first described in 1940 by Elmer Drew Merrill and Lily May Perry and has a conservation status of least concern.

== Description ==
Aglaia brassii is a tree which grows to about 20 m (66 ft) metres tall. It has a dense red-brown indumentum on most parts of the plant, including the flowers and fruit. The leaves are arranged alternately and are pinnately compound. The usually have three leaflets but may have up to seven. The leaflets may reach up to 22 cm (8.7 in) long and 7 cm (2.8 in) wide, and they have 6–11 lateral veins branching from the midrib.

The inflorescence is a panicle which grows from the leaf axils and reaches up to 14 cm (5.5 in) long. Flowers are 2–4 mm (0.08–0.16 in) long, with 4–6 petals that may be white, cream, yellow or brown. The fruit is a yellow or orange berry, about 3 cm (1.2 in) long and wide, containing one or two seeds that are encased in a translucent aril.

== Distribution and habitat ==
It grows as an understory tree in mountain rainforest, at altitudes between 600 and 1,300 m (2,000 and 4,300 ft). In Australia it occurs only around Mount Pieter Botte on the northern side of the Daintree River, and about 30 km (19 mi) to the southwest in the area of Mount Lewis National Park. It also occurs in Western New Guinea, Papua New Guinea and the Solomon Islands.

== Taxonomy ==
Aglaia brassii was first described by American botanists Elmer Drew Merrill and Lily May Perry, based on material collected in the Solomon Islands by Leonard John Brass in 1932. Merrill and Perry published the name in 1940 in the Journal of the Arnold Arboretum, with the comment that the new species bears some similarities with Aglaia obliqua, (now a synonym of Aglaia silvestris). It also bears similarities with Aglaia cooperae.

== Conservation ==
This species was most recently assessed by the International Union for Conservation of Nature (IUCN) in 2023 and found to be of least concern. In Queensland, it is rated as near-threatened by the Queensland Government under its Nature Conservation Act.

In its statement, the IUCN recognises that the species' habitat is declining but considers that this is offset by the large distribution area. In 1997 the IUCN gave the species the now-obsolete status of 'rare', and in 1998 it was changed to vulnerable.

== Uses ==
In the Solomon Islands, the timber was traditionally used to make handles for fighting axes.
