= Aglaia malabarica =

Conservation status
- Endangered (IUCN 3.1)

Scientific classification
- Kingdom: Plantae
- Clade: Tracheophytes
- Clade: Angiosperms
- Clade: Eudicots
- Clade: Rosids
- Order: Sapindales
- Family: Meliaceae
- Genus: Aglaia
- Species: A. malabarica

Binomial name
- Aglaia malabarica Sasidh.

Species of flowering plant

Aglaia malabarica is a species of flowering plant in the family Meliaceae. It is a tree which grows up to grows up to 25 metres tall that is endemic to Kerala, India. It is native to the middle elevations of the Western Ghats, where it grows in tropical evergreen rain forests up to 1000 meters elevation. Its estimated population is fewer than 1000 individuals.
