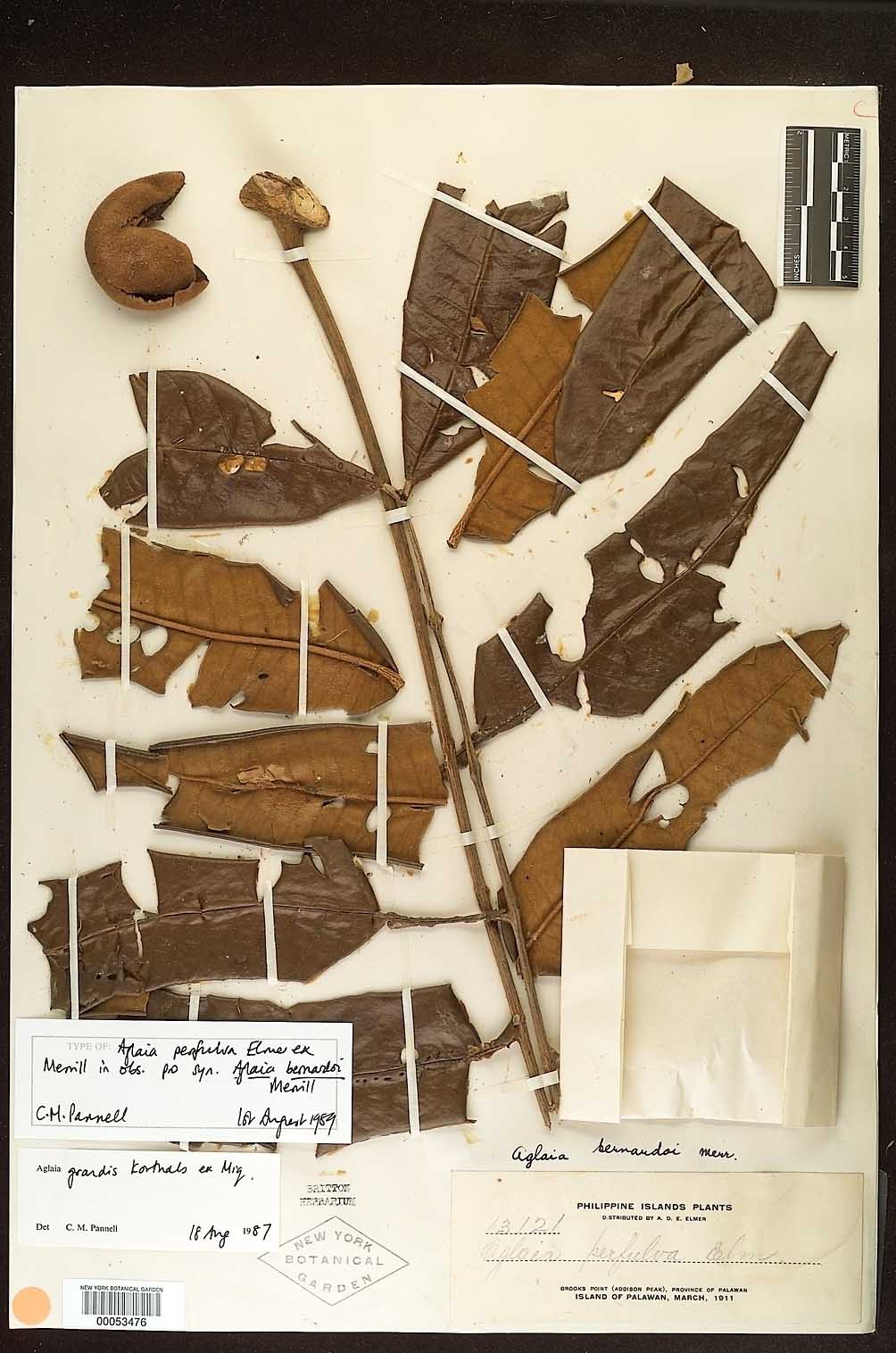
- Herbarium specimen of Aglaia grandis

Conservation status
- Near Threatened (IUCN 2.3)

Scientific classification
- Kingdom: Plantae
- Clade: Tracheophytes
- Clade: Angiosperms
- Clade: Eudicots
- Clade: Rosids
- Order: Sapindales
- Family: Meliaceae
- Genus: Aglaia
- Species: A. grandis

Binomial name
- Aglaia grandis Korth. ex Miq.

= Aglaia grandis =

Species of flowering plant

Aglaia grandis is a species of plant in the family Meliaceae. It is found in Indonesia, Malaysia, the Philippines, Thailand, and Vietnam. Its pinnate leaves are up to 200 cm (79 in) long and 80 cm (31 in) wide, with a 20 cm (8 in) petiole, this up to 2 cm thick at the base of the leaf. This is the largest once-pinnate leaf of any hardwood (Dicot) tree. The tree can reach a height of up to 27 m (89 ft).
