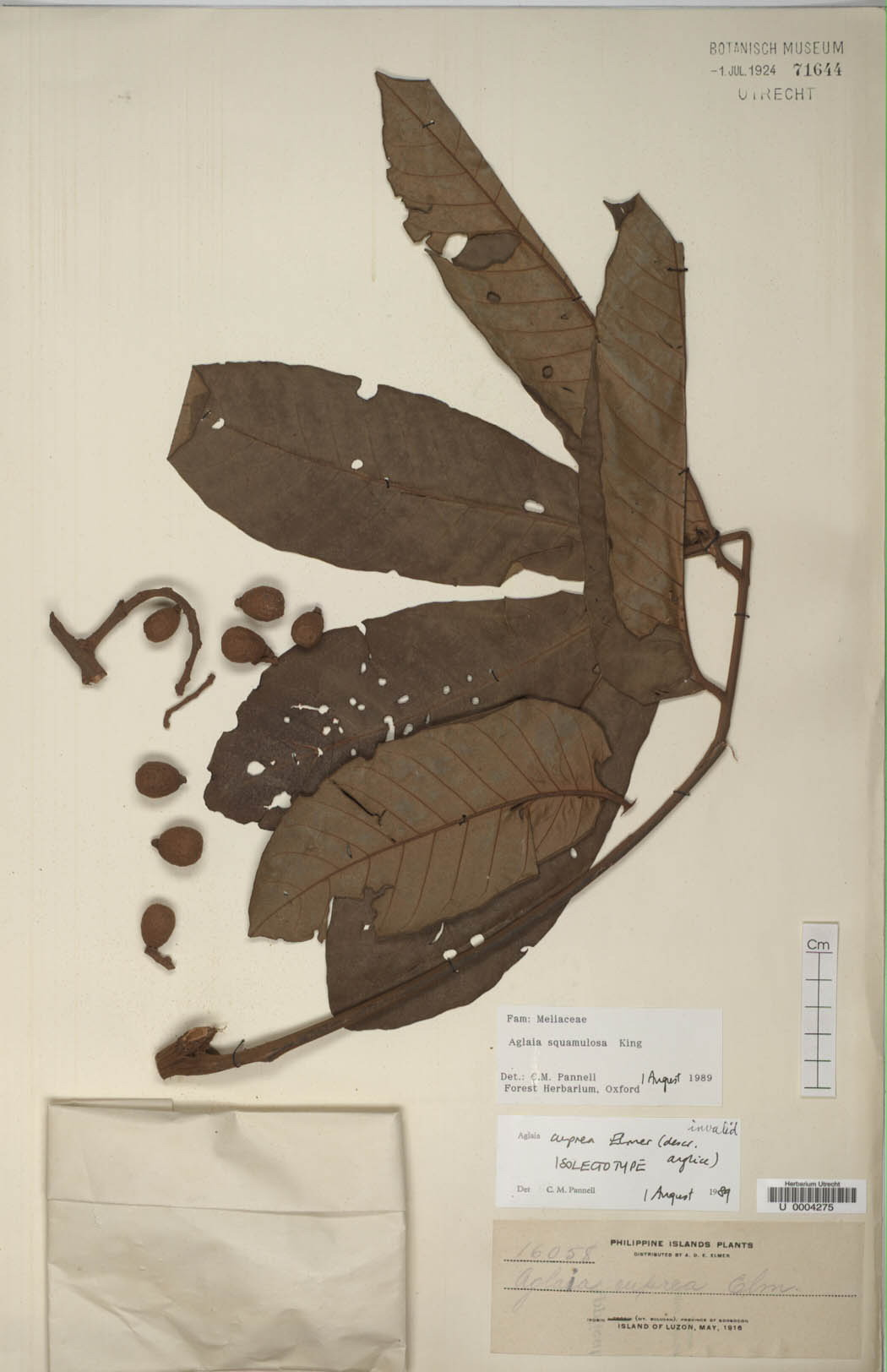
- Herbarium specimen of Aglaia squamulosa

Conservation status
- Near Threatened (IUCN 3.1)

Scientific classification
- Kingdom: Plantae
- Clade: Tracheophytes
- Clade: Angiosperms
- Clade: Eudicots
- Clade: Rosids
- Order: Sapindales
- Family: Meliaceae
- Genus: Aglaia
- Species: A. squamulosa

Binomial name
- Aglaia squamulosa King

Synonyms
- Aglaia cuprea Elmer

= Aglaia squamulosa =

Species of flowering plant

The bugalbal-pula (Aglaia squamulosa) is a species of flowering plant in the family Meliaceae. It is found in Indonesia, Malaysia, and the Philippines.
