= Aglaia cremea =

Conservation status
- Least Concern (IUCN 3.1)

Scientific classification
- Kingdom: Plantae
- Clade: Tracheophytes
- Clade: Angiosperms
- Clade: Eudicots
- Clade: Rosids
- Order: Sapindales
- Family: Meliaceae
- Genus: Aglaia
- Species: A. cremea

Binomial name
- Aglaia cremea Merrill & Perry

Species of flowering plant

Aglaia cremea is a species of plant in the family Meliaceae. It is endemic to Papua New Guinea.
