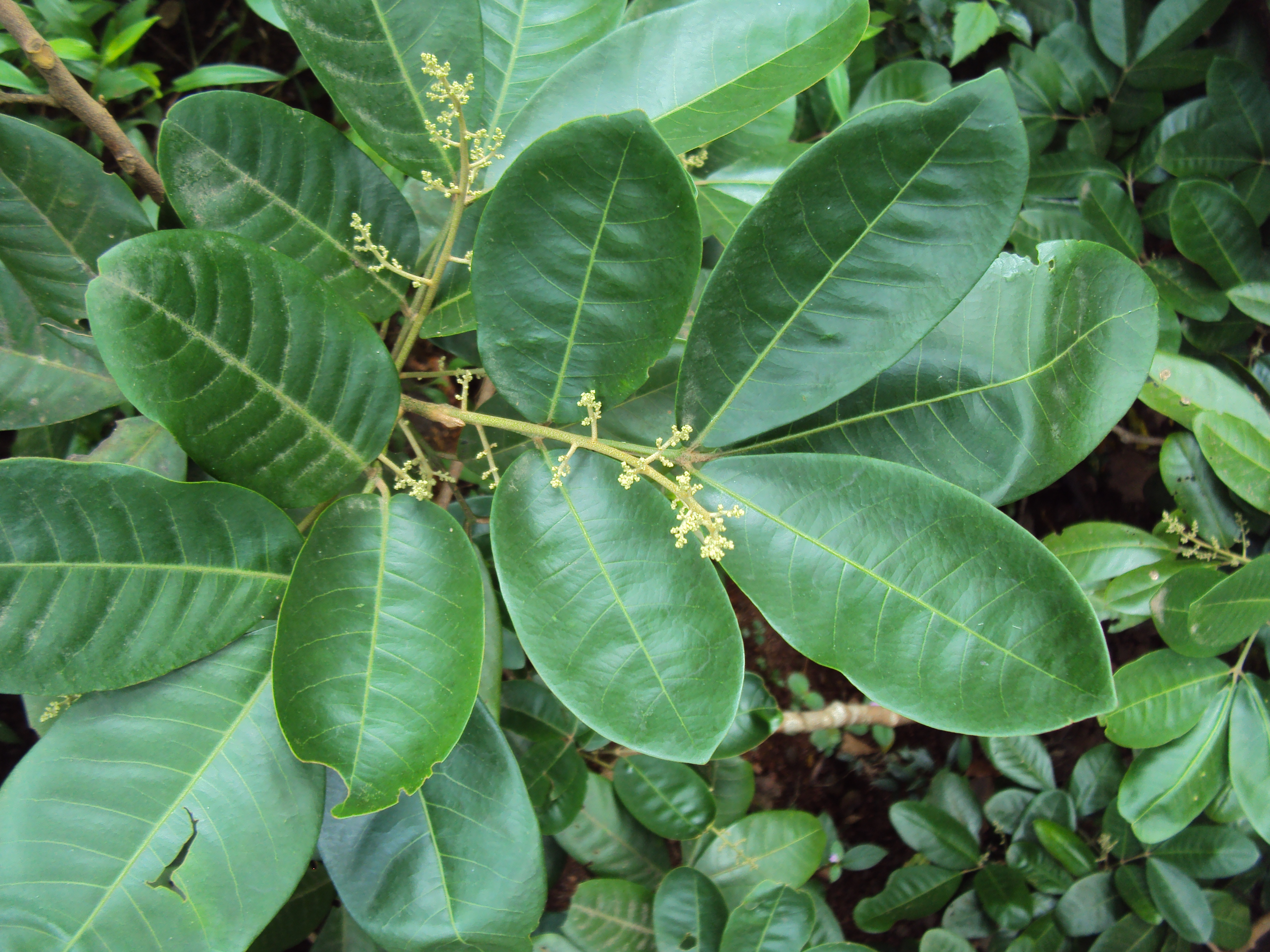

Scientific classification
- Kingdom: Plantae
- Clade: Tracheophytes
- Clade: Angiosperms
- Clade: Eudicots
- Clade: Rosids
- Order: Sapindales
- Family: Meliaceae
- Genus: Aglaia
- Species: A. roxburghiana

Binomial name
- Aglaia roxburghiana (Wight & Arn.) Miq.

= Aglaia roxburghiana =

Species of plant

Aglaia roxburghiana is a species of Aglaia. It is native to South Asia and Australia.
