= Aglaia teysmanniana =

Conservation status
- Near Threatened (IUCN 2.3)

Scientific classification
- Kingdom: Plantae
- Clade: Tracheophytes
- Clade: Angiosperms
- Clade: Eudicots
- Clade: Rosids
- Order: Sapindales
- Family: Meliaceae
- Genus: Aglaia
- Species: A. teysmanniana

Binomial name
- Aglaia teysmanniana (Miq.) Miq.

Species of flowering plant

Aglaia teysmanniana is a species of plant in the family Meliaceae. It is found in China, Indonesia, Malaysia, the Philippines, Thailand, and possibly Papua New Guinea.
