= Aglaia amplexicaulis =

Conservation status
- Endangered (IUCN 3.1)

Scientific classification
- Kingdom: Plantae
- Clade: Tracheophytes
- Clade: Angiosperms
- Clade: Eudicots
- Clade: Rosids
- Order: Sapindales
- Family: Meliaceae
- Genus: Aglaia
- Species: A. amplexicaulis

Binomial name
- Aglaia amplexicaulis A.C.Sm.

Species of flowering plant

Aglaia amplexicaulis is a species of tree in the family Meliaceae, endemic to Fiji.
