= Aglaia rubiginosa =

Conservation status
- Least Concern (IUCN 3.1)

Scientific classification
- Kingdom: Plantae
- Clade: Tracheophytes
- Clade: Angiosperms
- Clade: Eudicots
- Clade: Rosids
- Order: Sapindales
- Family: Meliaceae
- Genus: Aglaia
- Species: A. rubiginosa

Binomial name
- Aglaia rubiginosa (Hiern) Pannell

Synonyms
- Amoora rubiginosa Hiern; Aglaia ignea Valeton ex K.Heyne; Aphanamixis rubiginosa Griff. ex C.DC.

Species of flowering plant

Aglaia rubiginosa is a species of plant in the family Meliaceae. It is found in Indonesia, Malaysia, the Philippines, and Singapore.
