= Aglaia macrocarpa =

Conservation status
- Near Threatened (IUCN 2.3)

Scientific classification
- Kingdom: Plantae
- Clade: Tracheophytes
- Clade: Angiosperms
- Clade: Eudicots
- Clade: Rosids
- Order: Sapindales
- Family: Meliaceae
- Genus: Aglaia
- Species: A. macrocarpa

Binomial name
- Aglaia macrocarpa (Miq.) Pannell

Species of flowering plant

Aglaia macrocarpa is a species of plant in the family Meliaceae. It is found in Brunei, Indonesia, Malaysia, Singapore, Thailand, Vietnam, and possibly the Philippines.
