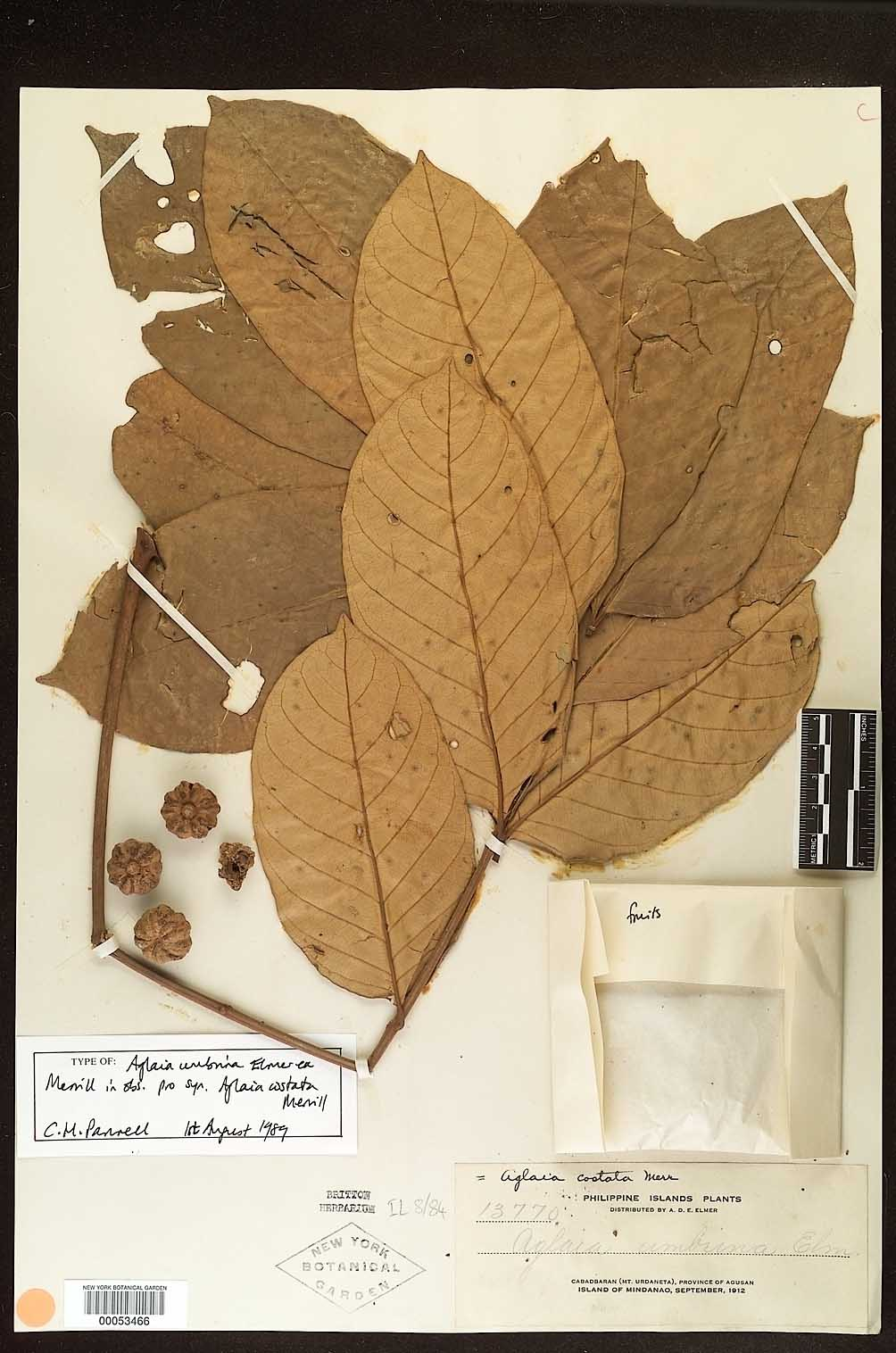
- Herbarium specimen of Aglaia costata

Conservation status
- Endangered (IUCN 3.1)

Scientific classification
- Kingdom: Plantae
- Clade: Tracheophytes
- Clade: Angiosperms
- Clade: Eudicots
- Clade: Rosids
- Order: Sapindales
- Family: Meliaceae
- Genus: Aglaia
- Species: A. costata

Binomial name
- Aglaia costata Merr.

= Aglaia costata =

Species of tree

Aglaia costata is a species of tree in the family Meliaceae. It is endemic to the Philippines.
