= Aglaia (plant) =

- Aglaia roxburghiana

Scientific classification
- Kingdom: Plantae
- Clade: Tracheophytes
- Clade: Angiosperms
- Clade: Eudicots
- Clade: Rosids
- Order: Sapindales
- Family: Meliaceae
- Subfamily: Melioideae
- Genus: Aglaia; Lour.

Synonyms
- Aglaiopsis Miq.; Amoora Roxb.; Andersonia Roxb.; Argophilum Blanco; Beddomea Hook.f.; Camunium Roxb.; Euphora Griff.; Hearnia F.Muell.; Lepiaglaia Pierre; Lepidaglaia Pierre; Merostela Pierre; Milnea Roxb.; Nemedra A.Juss.; Nialel Adans.; Nimmoia Wight; Nyalelia Dennst. ex Kostel.; Oraoma Turcz.; Selbya M.Roem.

Genus of flowering plants

Aglaia is a genus of 125 recognised species of woody dioecious trees in the mahogany family Meliaceae. They occur in the subtropical and tropical forests of Southeast Asia, northern Australia and the Pacific.

Some species are important timber trees; others have scented flowers, or medicinal properties (the edible fruits duku or langsat have now been placed in the genus Lansium). Many have complex biological relationships with their dispersal agents.

== Phytochemistry ==
Species in the genus Aglaia synthesize a unique class of highly bioactive chemical compounds known as flavaglines. Over 50 unique compounds of this class have been described so far, including rocaglamide, aglafoline, silvestrol, pannellin, episilvestrol, and ponapensin. They are known for their anti-cancer, anti-fungal, anti-inflammatory and insecticidal properties. Several of these compounds have been shown to be exceptional therapeutic agents for cancer chemotherapy, however further research is needed to develop medicines.

== Species ==
As of 20 November 2026, there are 125 species are accepted by Plants of the World Online, as follows:

- Aglaia agglomerata Merr. & L.M.Perry
- Aglaia aherniana Perkins
- Aglaia amplexicaulis A.C.Sm.
- Aglaia angustifolia (Miq.) Miq.
- Aglaia apiocarpa (Thwaites) Hiern
- Aglaia archboldiana A.C.Sm.
- Aglaia argentea Blume
- Aglaia australiensis Pannell
- Aglaia barbanthera C.DC.
- Aglaia basiphylla A.Gray
- Aglaia beccarii C.DC.
- Aglaia bourdillonii Gamble
- Aglaia bracteolata Pannell
- Aglaia brassii Merr. & L.M.Perry
- Aglaia brownii Pannell
- Aglaia bullata Pannell
- Aglaia ceramica (Miq.) Pannell
- Aglaia chittagonga Miq.
- Aglaia conferta Merr. & L.M.Perry
- Aglaia cooperae Pannell
- Aglaia coriacea Korth. ex Miq.
- Aglaia costata Merr.
- Aglaia crassinervia Kurz ex Hiern
- Aglaia cremea Merr. & L.M.Perry
- Aglaia cucullata (Roxb.) Pellegr.
- Aglaia cumingiana Turcz.
- Aglaia cuspidata C.DC.
- Aglaia densisquama Pannell
- Aglaia densitricha Pannell
- Aglaia edulis (Roxb.) Wall.
- Aglaia elaeagnoidea (A.Juss.) Benth.
- Aglaia elliptica Blume
- Aglaia erythrosperma Pannell
- Aglaia euryanthera Harms
- Aglaia evansensis A.C.Sm.
- Aglaia eximia Miq.
- Aglaia exstipulata (Griff.) W.Theob.
- Aglaia fellii W.E.Cooper & Joyce
- Aglaia ferruginea C.T.White & W.D.Francis
- Aglaia flavescens C.DC.
- Aglaia flavida Merr. & L.M.Perry
- Aglaia forbesii King
- Aglaia foveolata Pannell
- Aglaia fragilis A.C.Sm.
- Aglaia glabrata Teijsm. & Binn.
- Aglaia gracilis A.C.Sm.
- Aglaia grandis Korth. ex Miq.
- Aglaia heterotricha A.C.Sm.
- Aglaia hiernii King
- Aglaia ijzermannii Boerl. & Koord.-Schum.
- Aglaia integrifolia Pannell
- Aglaia korthalsii Miq.
- Aglaia lancilimba Merr.
- Aglaia lawii (Wight) C.J.Saldanha
- Aglaia laxiflora Miq.
- Aglaia lepidopetala Harms
- Aglaia lepiorrhachis Harms
- Aglaia leptantha Miq.
- Aglaia leucoclada C.DC.
- Aglaia leucophylla King
- Aglaia luzoniensis (S.Vidal) Merr. & Rolfe
- Aglaia mabberleyi Pannell
- Aglaia mackiana Pannell
- Aglaia macrocarpa (Miq.) Pannell
- Aglaia macrostigma King
- Aglaia malabarica Sasidh.
- Aglaia malaccensis (Ridl.) Pannell
- Aglaia mariannensis Merr.
- Aglaia membranifolia King
- Aglaia meridionalis Pannell
- Aglaia monocaula C.M.Pannell
- Aglaia monozyga Harms
- Aglaia monticola W.E.Cooper & P.I.Forst.
- Aglaia multinervis Pannell
- Aglaia nyaruensis C.M.Pannell
- Aglaia odorata Lour.
- Aglaia odoratissima Blume
- Aglaia oligophylla Miq.
- Aglaia pachyphylla Miq.
- Aglaia palembanica Miq.
- Aglaia pannelliana W.N.Takeuchi
- Aglaia parksii A.C.Sm.
- Aglaia parviflora C.DC.
- Aglaia penningtoniana Pannell
- Aglaia perviridis Hiern
- Aglaia pleuropteris Pierre
- Aglaia polyneura C.DC.
- Aglaia puberulanthera C.DC.
- Aglaia pyriformis Merr.
- Aglaia ramotricha Pannell
- Aglaia rimosa (Blanco) Merr.
- Aglaia rivularis Merr.
- Aglaia roxburghiana (Wight & Arn.) Miq.
- Aglaia rubiginosa (Hiern) Pannell
- Aglaia rubrivenia Merr. & L.M.Perry
- Aglaia rufibarbis Ridl.
- Aglaia rufinervis (Blume) Bentv.
- Aglaia rugulosa Pannell
- Aglaia saltatorum A.C.Sm.
- Aglaia samoensis A.Gray
- Aglaia sapindina (F.Muell.) Harms
- Aglaia saxonii W.N.Takeuchi
- Aglaia scortechinii King
- Aglaia sessilifolia Pannell
- Aglaia sexipetala Griff.
- Aglaia silvestris (M.Roem.) Merr.
- Aglaia simplicifolia (Bedd.) Harms
- Aglaia smithii Koord.
- Aglaia soepadmoi Pannell
- Aglaia speciosa Blume
- Aglaia spectabilis (Miq.) S.S.Jain & S.Bennet
- Aglaia squamulosa King
- Aglaia stellatopilosa Pannell
- Aglaia subcuprea Merr. & L.M.Perry
- Aglaia subminutiflora C.DC.
- Aglaia subsessilis Pannell
- Aglaia taiwaniana S.S.Ying
- Aglaia taynguyenensis T.Ð.Ðai
- Aglaia tenuicaulis Hiern
- Aglaia teysmanniana (Miq.) Miq.
- Aglaia tomentosa Teijsm. & Binn.
- Aglaia unifolia P.T.Li & X.M.Chen
- Aglaia variisquama Pannell
- Aglaia vitiensis A.C.Sm.
- Aglaia wallichii Hiern
