= Aglaia densitricha =

Conservation status
- Data Deficient (IUCN 3.1)

Scientific classification
- Kingdom: Plantae
- Clade: Tracheophytes
- Clade: Angiosperms
- Clade: Eudicots
- Clade: Rosids
- Order: Sapindales
- Family: Meliaceae
- Genus: Aglaia
- Species: A. densitricha

Binomial name
- Aglaia densitricha Pannell

Species of tree

Aglaia densitricha is a species of flowering plant in the family Meliaceae. It is a tree endemic to Peninsular Malaysia.
