= Aglaia bourdillonii =

Conservation status
- Vulnerable (IUCN 2.3)

Scientific classification
- Kingdom: Plantae
- Clade: Embryophytes
- Clade: Tracheophytes
- Clade: Spermatophytes
- Clade: Angiosperms
- Clade: Eudicots
- Clade: Rosids
- Order: Sapindales
- Family: Meliaceae
- Genus: Aglaia
- Species: A. bourdillonii

Binomial name
- Aglaia bourdillonii Gamble

Synonyms
- Aglaia elaeagnoidea var. bourdillonii (Gamble) N.C.Nair

Species of flowering plant

Aglaia bourdillonii is a species of plant in the family Meliaceae. It is endemic to southern India.
