= Aglaia membranifolia =

Conservation status
- Vulnerable (IUCN 3.1)

Scientific classification
- Kingdom: Plantae
- Clade: Tracheophytes
- Clade: Angiosperms
- Clade: Eudicots
- Clade: Rosids
- Order: Sapindales
- Family: Meliaceae
- Genus: Aglaia
- Species: A. membranifolia

Binomial name
- Aglaia membranifolia King

Species of flowering plant

Aglaia membranifolia is a species of flowering plant in the family Meliaceae. It is found in Indonesia and Malaysia.
