= Aglaia stellatopilosa =

Scientific classification
- Kingdom: Plantae
- Clade: Tracheophytes
- Clade: Angiosperms
- Clade: Eudicots
- Clade: Rosids
- Order: Sapindales
- Family: Meliaceae
- Genus: Aglaia
- Species: A. stellatopilosa

Binomial name
- Aglaia stellatopilosa Pannell

Species of tree

Aglaia stellatopilosa is a tree in the family Meliaceae. It grows up to 8 metres (30 ft) tall with a trunk diameter of up to 10 centimetres (4 in). The bark is greyish green. The fruits are roundish; yellow, orange or yellowish brown when ripe; up to 2.3 cm (1 in) in diameter. The specific epithet stellatopilosa is from the Latin meaning 'stellate hairs', referring to those on the twigs. Habitat is forests from sea-level to 1,200 metres (4,000 ft) altitude. A. stellatopilosa is endemic to Borneo.
