= Aglaia pleuropteris =

Conservation status
- Critically Endangered (IUCN 2.3)

Scientific classification
- Kingdom: Plantae
- Clade: Tracheophytes
- Clade: Angiosperms
- Clade: Eudicots
- Clade: Rosids
- Order: Sapindales
- Family: Meliaceae
- Genus: Aglaia
- Species: A. pleuropteris

Binomial name
- Aglaia pleuropteris Pierre

Species of flowering plant

Aglaia pleuropteris is a species of flowering plant in the family Meliaceae. It is a shrub or tree native to Vietnam and Laos, and possibly to Cambodia.

The species was first described by Jean Baptiste Louis Pierre in 1897.
