= Aglaia parksii =

Conservation status
- Vulnerable (IUCN 2.3)

Scientific classification
- Kingdom: Plantae
- Clade: Tracheophytes
- Clade: Angiosperms
- Clade: Eudicots
- Clade: Rosids
- Order: Sapindales
- Family: Meliaceae
- Genus: Aglaia
- Species: A. parksii

Binomial name
- Aglaia parksii A.C.Smith

Species of flowering plant

Aglaia parksii is a species of plant in the family Meliaceae. It is found in Fiji, Papua New Guinea, and the Solomon Islands.
