= Aglaia crassinervia =

Conservation status
- Least Concern (IUCN 3.1)

Scientific classification
- Kingdom: Plantae
- Clade: Tracheophytes
- Clade: Angiosperms
- Clade: Eudicots
- Clade: Rosids
- Order: Sapindales
- Family: Meliaceae
- Genus: Aglaia
- Species: A. crassinervia

Binomial name
- Aglaia crassinervia Kurz ex Hiern

Synonyms
- Aglaia cinerea King; Aglaia pyricarpa Baker f.; Chisocheton sumatranus Baker f.

Species of flowering plant

Aglaia crassinervia is a species of plant in the family Meliaceae. It is found in Brunei, India, Indonesia, Malaysia, Myanmar, the Philippines, and Thailand.
