= Aglaia gracilis =

Conservation status
- Least Concern (IUCN 3.1)

Scientific classification
- Kingdom: Plantae
- Clade: Tracheophytes
- Clade: Angiosperms
- Clade: Eudicots
- Clade: Rosids
- Order: Sapindales
- Family: Meliaceae
- Genus: Aglaia
- Species: A. gracilis

Binomial name
- Aglaia gracilis A.C. Smith

Synonyms
- Didymocheton obliquus (Gillespie) Harms; Dysoxylum obliquum Gillespie

Species of flowering plant

Aglaia gracilis is a species of flowering plant in the family Meliaceae. It is a shrub or small tree endemic to Viti Levu in Fiji. It grows 2 to 5 metres tall in dry forests from 50 to 1,200 metres elevation.

The species was described by Albert Charles Smith in 1952.
