= Aglaia glabrata =

Conservation status
- Near Threatened (IUCN 2.3)

Scientific classification
- Kingdom: Plantae
- Clade: Tracheophytes
- Clade: Angiosperms
- Clade: Eudicots
- Clade: Rosids
- Order: Sapindales
- Family: Meliaceae
- Genus: Aglaia
- Species: A. glabrata

Binomial name
- Aglaia glabrata Teijsm. & Binn.

Species of flowering plant

Aglaia glabrata is a species of plant in the family Meliaceae. Aglaia glabrata is native to Brunei, Indonesia, and Malaysia.
