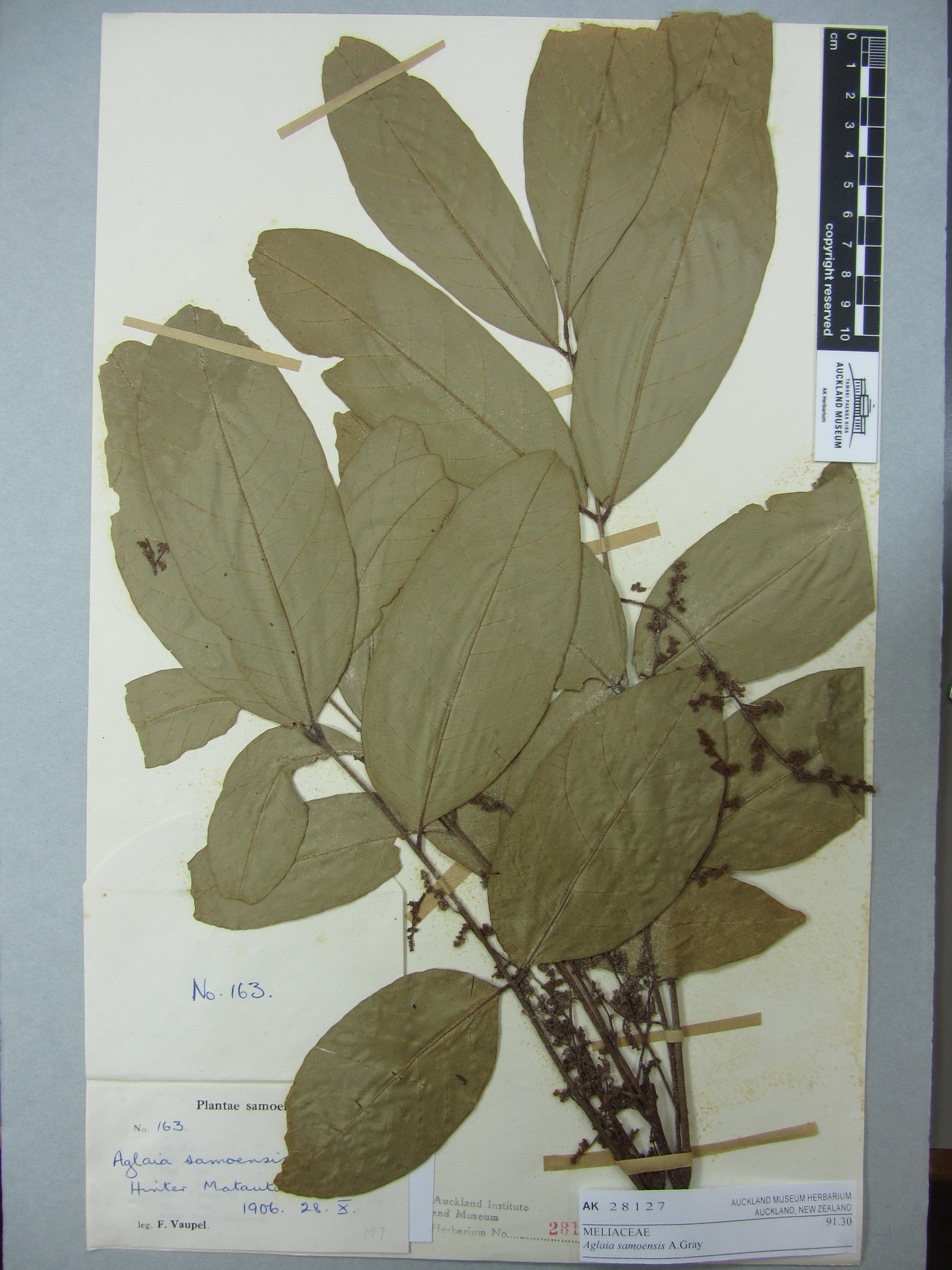

Conservation status
- Near Threatened (IUCN 2.3)

Scientific classification
- Kingdom: Plantae
- Clade: Tracheophytes
- Clade: Angiosperms
- Clade: Eudicots
- Clade: Rosids
- Order: Sapindales
- Family: Meliaceae
- Genus: Aglaia
- Species: A. samoensis

Binomial name
- Aglaia samoensis A.Gray

= Aglaia samoensis =

Species of tree

Aglaia samoensis is a species of tree in the family Meliaceae. It is found in American Samoa, New Guinea, Samoa, the Solomon Islands, Vanuatu, and Wallis and Futuna Islands.
