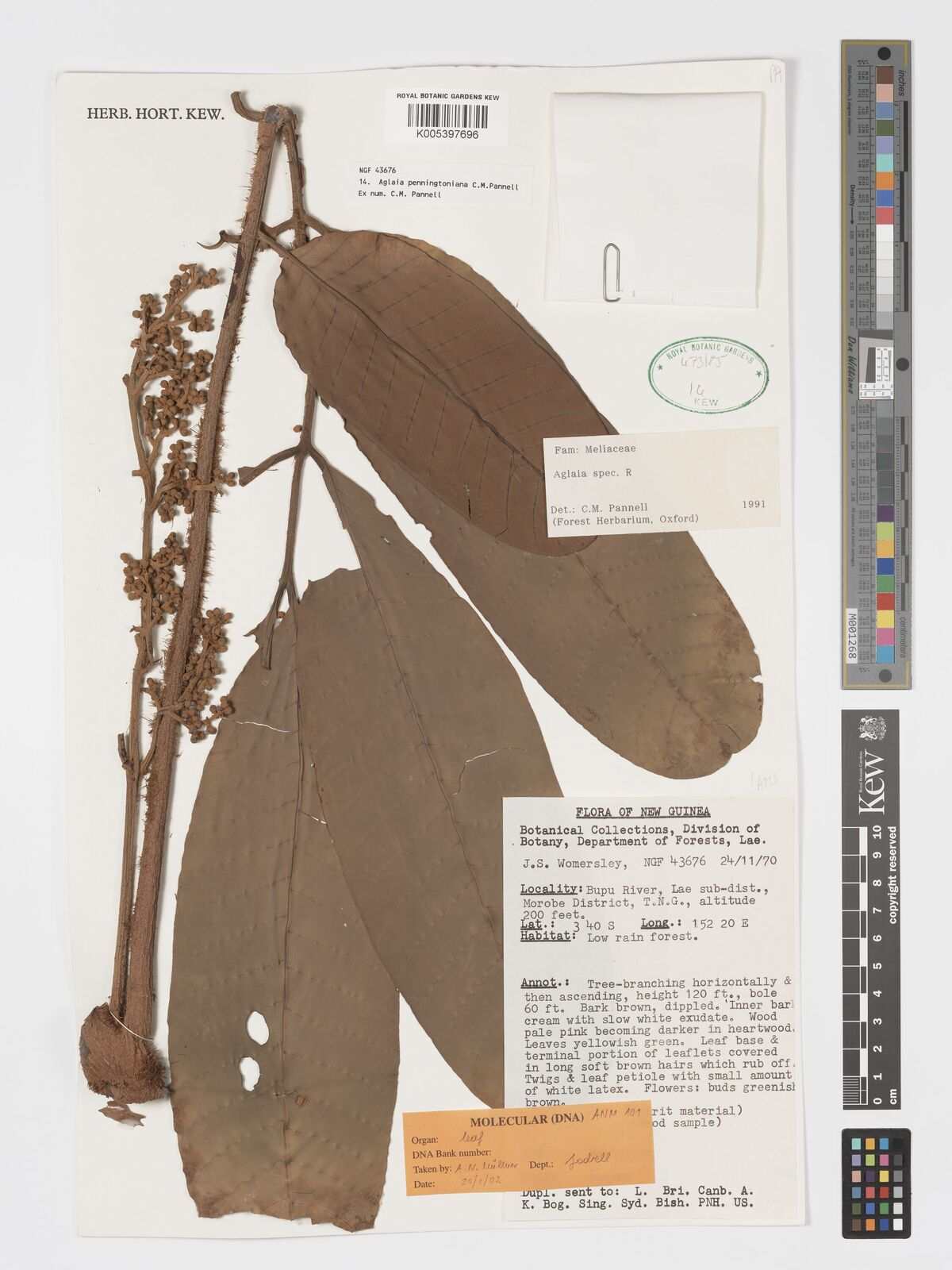

Conservation status
- Endangered (IUCN 3.1)

Scientific classification
- Kingdom: Plantae
- Clade: Tracheophytes
- Clade: Angiosperms
- Clade: Eudicots
- Clade: Rosids
- Order: Sapindales
- Family: Meliaceae
- Genus: Aglaia
- Species: A. penningtoniana

Binomial name
- Aglaia penningtoniana Pannell

= Aglaia penningtoniana =

Species of flowering plant

Aglaia penningtoniana is a species of plant in the family Meliaceae. It is endemic to Papua New Guinea.
