= Aglaia perviridis =

Conservation status
- Vulnerable (IUCN 2.3)

Scientific classification
- Kingdom: Plantae
- Clade: Tracheophytes
- Clade: Angiosperms
- Clade: Eudicots
- Clade: Rosids
- Order: Sapindales
- Family: Meliaceae
- Genus: Aglaia
- Species: A. perviridis

Binomial name
- Aglaia perviridis Hiern

Synonyms
- Aglaia canarensis Gamble; Aglaia kingiana Ridl.; Aglaia maiae Bourd.

Species of flowering plant

Aglaia perviridis is a species of plant in the family Meliaceae. It is found in Bangladesh, Bhutan, China, India, Malaysia, Thailand, and Vietnam.
