= Aglaia evansensis =

Conservation status
- Critically Endangered (IUCN 3.1)

Scientific classification
- Kingdom: Plantae
- Clade: Tracheophytes
- Clade: Angiosperms
- Clade: Eudicots
- Clade: Rosids
- Order: Sapindales
- Family: Meliaceae
- Genus: Aglaia
- Species: A. evansensis

Binomial name
- Aglaia evansensis A.C.Smith

Species of flowering plant

Aglaia evansensis is a species of flowering plant in the family Meliaceae. It is a shrub or tree endemic to northwestern Viti Levu in Fiji. It grows 2 to eight metres tall in low, dense montane rain forest from 900 to 1,180 metres elevation.

The species was described by Albert Charles Smith in 1952.
