= Aglaia bullata =

Conservation status
- Endangered (IUCN 3.1)

Scientific classification
- Kingdom: Plantae
- Clade: Tracheophytes
- Clade: Angiosperms
- Clade: Eudicots
- Clade: Rosids
- Order: Sapindales
- Family: Meliaceae
- Genus: Aglaia
- Species: A. bullata

Binomial name
- Aglaia bullata Pannell

Species of flowering plant

Aglaia bullata is a tree in the family Meliaceae, native to Borneo.

== Description ==
Aglaia bullata grows up to 10 m (30 ft) tall with a trunk diameter of up to 12 cm (5 in). The bark is greyish brown. The fruits are roundish, brownish yellow, up to 1.5 cm (0.6 in) in diameter.

== Taxonomy ==
Aglaia bullata was described by British botanist Caroline Pannell in the Kew Bulletin in 2004. The type specimen was collected in Kapit District in Sarawak, Borneo. The specific epithet bullata means 'puckered', referring to the leaflets.

== Distribution and habitat ==
Aglaia bullata is endemic to Sarawak state in Borneo, where it is confined to Kapit and Mukah Districts. Its habitat is mixed dipterocarp forests at 400–1,100 m (1,000–4,000 ft) altitude.

== Conservation ==
Aglaia bullata has been assessed as endangered on the IUCN Red List. It is threatened by logging and by conversion of its habitat for palm oil plantations. It is not known to be present in any protected areas.
