= Aglaia unifolia =

Conservation status
- Critically Endangered (IUCN 3.1)

Scientific classification
- Kingdom: Plantae
- Clade: Tracheophytes
- Clade: Angiosperms
- Clade: Eudicots
- Clade: Rosids
- Order: Sapindales
- Family: Meliaceae
- Genus: Aglaia
- Species: A. unifolia

Binomial name
- Aglaia unifolia P.T.Li & X.M.Chen

Synonyms
- Aglaia haplophylla A.C.Sm. (1952), nom. illeg. homonym. post.

Species of flowering plant

Aglaia unifolia is a species of flowering plant in the family Meliaceae. It is a small tree endemic to the island of Viti Levu in Fiji. It grows up to 7 metres tall in montane rain forest on a high ridge from 1,050 to 1,120 metres elevation.

The species was described by Ping Tao Li and Xi Mu Chen in 1984.
