= Aglaia rufibarbis =

Scientific classification
- Kingdom: Plantae
- Clade: Tracheophytes
- Clade: Angiosperms
- Clade: Eudicots
- Clade: Rosids
- Order: Sapindales
- Family: Meliaceae
- Genus: Aglaia
- Species: A. rufibarbis

Binomial name
- Aglaia rufibarbis Ridl.

Species of tree

Aglaia rufibarbis is a small tree in the family Meliaceae. It grows up to 5 metres (20 ft) tall with a trunk diameter of up to 5 centimetres (2 in). The bark is usually grey and pale brown, sometimes dark brown. The fruits are roundish, up to 2 cm (1 in) in diameter. The specific epithet rufibarbis is from the Latin meaning 'red beard', referring to the reddish brown hairs of the indumentum. Habitat is mixed dipterocarp forests from 100 metres (300 ft) to 250 metres (800 ft) altitude. A. rufibarbis is found in Peninsular Malaysia and Borneo.
