= Aglaia apiocarpa =

Conservation status
- Vulnerable (IUCN 2.3)

Scientific classification
- Kingdom: Plantae
- Clade: Tracheophytes
- Clade: Angiosperms
- Clade: Eudicots
- Clade: Rosids
- Order: Sapindales
- Family: Meliaceae
- Genus: Aglaia
- Species: A. apiocarpa

Binomial name
- Aglaia apiocarpa (Thwaites) Hiern

Synonyms
- Aglaia congylos Kosterm.; Milnea apiocarpa Thwaites

Species of flowering plant

Aglaia apiocarpa is a species of plant in the family Meliaceae. It is found in Southern India and Sri Lanka.

== Description ==
Leaves compound, pinnate; lamina broadly elliptic; apex acuminate with blunt tip; base cuneate; with recurved margin. Yellow colored flowers are unisexual and show panicle inflorescence. Fruit is a single-seeded, reddish obovoid berry.
