= Aglaia macrostigma =

Conservation status
- Vulnerable (IUCN 2.3)

Scientific classification
- Kingdom: Plantae
- Clade: Tracheophytes
- Clade: Angiosperms
- Clade: Eudicots
- Clade: Rosids
- Order: Sapindales
- Family: Meliaceae
- Genus: Aglaia
- Species: A. macrostigma

Binomial name
- Aglaia macrostigma King

Species of tree

Aglaia macrostigma is a species of flowering plant in the family Meliaceae. It is a tree endemic to Peninsular Malaysia.
