= Aglaia basiphylla =

Conservation status
- Vulnerable (IUCN 2.3)

Scientific classification
- Kingdom: Plantae
- Clade: Tracheophytes
- Clade: Angiosperms
- Clade: Eudicots
- Clade: Rosids
- Order: Sapindales
- Family: Meliaceae
- Genus: Aglaia
- Species: A. basiphylla

Binomial name
- Aglaia basiphylla A.Gray

Synonyms
- Aglaia elegans Gillespie, 1931; Aglaia greenwoodii A.C.Sm.; Aglaia venusta A.C.Sm.

Species of flowering plant

Aglaia basiphylla is a species of plant in the family Meliaceae. It is endemic to Fiji.
