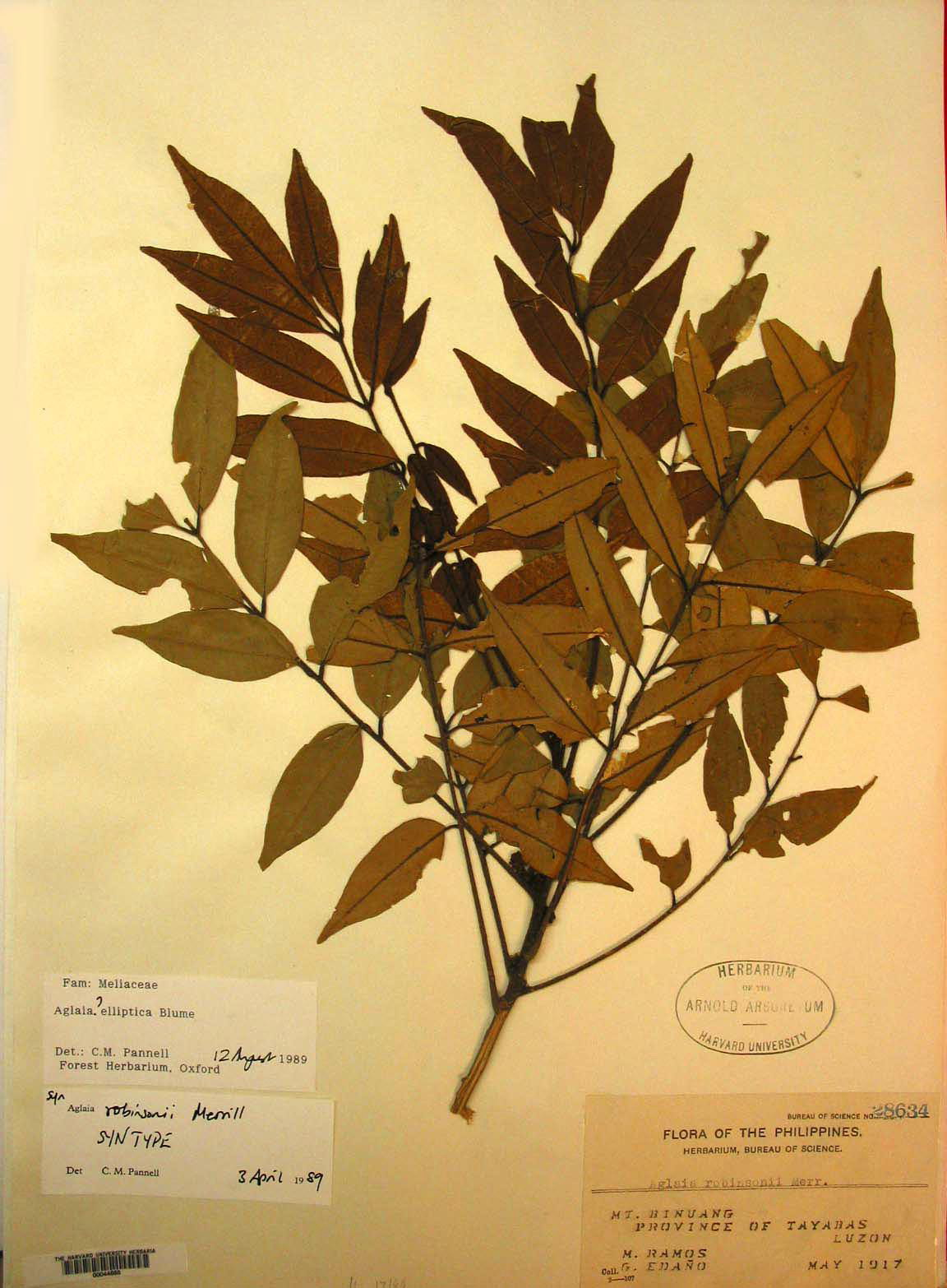
- Herbarium specimen of Aglaia elliptica

Conservation status
- Least Concern (IUCN 3.1)

Scientific classification
- Kingdom: Plantae
- Clade: Tracheophytes
- Clade: Angiosperms
- Clade: Eudicots
- Clade: Rosids
- Order: Sapindales
- Family: Meliaceae
- Genus: Aglaia
- Species: A. elliptica

Binomial name
- Aglaia elliptica Blume

Subspecies
- Aglaia elliptica subsp. clementis (Merr.) Pannell; Aglaia elliptica subsp. elliptica

Synonyms
- Hearnia elliptica C.DC.; synonyms of subsp. clementis: Aglaia clementis Merr.; synonyms of subsp. elliptica: Aglaia antonii Elmer; Aglaia apoana Merr.; Aglaia banahaensis Elmer ex Merr.; Aglaia baramensis Merr.; Aglaia caulobotrys Quisumb. & Merr.; Aglaia cinnamomea Baker f.; Aglaia davaoensis Elmer; Aglaia harmsiana G.Perkins; Aglaia havilandii Ridl.; Aglaia inaequalis Teijsm. & Binn.; Aglaia lagunensis Merr.; Aglaia lancifolia (Hook.f.) Harms; Aglaia langlassei C.DC.; Aglaia longipetiolata Elmer; Aglaia marginata Craib; Aglaia menadonensis Koord.; Aglaia micrantha Merr.; Aglaia mindanaensis Merr. ex Elmer; Aglaia moultonii Merr.; Aglaia negrosensis Merr. ex Elmer; Aglaia ovata Teijsm. & Binn.; Aglaia oxypetala Valeton; Aglaia palawanensis Merr.; Aglaia pauciflora Merr.; Aglaia querciflorescens Elmer; Aglaia reinwardtii Miq.; Aglaia robinsonii Merr.; Aglaia rufa var. celebica Miq.; Aglaia sorsogonensis Elmer; Aglaia stapfii Koord.; Aglaia tayabensis Merr.; Aglaia tembelingensis M.R.Hend.; Aglaia trunciflora Merr.; Aglaia urdanetensis Elmer; Aglaia villosa (C.DC.) Merr.; Aglaiopsis lancifolia (Hook.f.) Miq.; Hearnia lancifolia (Hook.f.) C.DC.; Hearnia villosa C.DC.; Milnea dulcis Teijsm. & Binn.; Milnea lancifolia Hook.f.

= Aglaia elliptica =

Species of flowering plant

Aglaia elliptica is a species of flowering plant in the family Meliaceae. It is a tree native to Brunei, Indonesia (Borneo, Sumatra, Java, Sulawesi, and the Lesser Sunda Islands), Malaysia (Peninsular Malaysia, Sabah, and Sarawak), Myanmar, the Philippines, and Thailand.

Two subspecies are accepted:

- Aglaia elliptica subsp. clementis (Merr.) Pannell (synonym Aglaia clementis Merr.) – Borneo and Sulawesi
- Aglaia elliptica subsp. elliptica – Borneo, Java, Lesser Sunda Islands, Peninsular Malaysia, Myanmar, Philippines, Sulawesi, Sumatra, and Thailand

The species was first described by Carl Ludwig Blume in 1825.
