= Aglaia mackiana =

Conservation status
- Data Deficient (IUCN 3.1)

Scientific classification
- Kingdom: Plantae
- Clade: Tracheophytes
- Clade: Angiosperms
- Clade: Eudicots
- Clade: Rosids
- Order: Sapindales
- Family: Meliaceae
- Genus: Aglaia
- Species: A. mackiana

Binomial name
- Aglaia mackiana Pannell

Species of flowering plant

Aglaia mackiana is a species of flowering plant in the family Meliaceae. It is a tree endemic to New Guinea.
