= Aglaia integrifolia =

Conservation status
- Critically Endangered (IUCN 3.1)

Scientific classification
- Kingdom: Plantae
- Clade: Tracheophytes
- Clade: Angiosperms
- Clade: Eudicots
- Clade: Rosids
- Order: Sapindales
- Family: Meliaceae
- Genus: Aglaia
- Species: A. integrifolia

Binomial name
- Aglaia integrifolia Pannell

Species of flowering plant

Aglaia integrifolia is a species of flowering plant in the family Meliaceae. It is a tree endemic to New Guinea. It is known from a single location in Kuriva, Central Province, where it grows in deciduous hill lowland moist forest.
