= Aglaia malaccensis =

Conservation status
- Least Concern (IUCN 3.1)

Scientific classification
- Kingdom: Plantae
- Clade: Tracheophytes
- Clade: Angiosperms
- Clade: Eudicots
- Clade: Rosids
- Order: Sapindales
- Family: Meliaceae
- Genus: Aglaia
- Species: A. malaccensis

Binomial name
- Aglaia malaccensis (Ridley) Pannell

Species of flowering plant

Aglaia malaccensis is a species of plant in the family Meliaceae. It is found in Indonesia, Malaysia, and the Philippines.
