= Aglaia rufinervis =

Conservation status
- Near Threatened (IUCN 2.3)

Scientific classification
- Kingdom: Plantae
- Clade: Tracheophytes
- Clade: Angiosperms
- Clade: Eudicots
- Clade: Rosids
- Order: Sapindales
- Family: Meliaceae
- Genus: Aglaia
- Species: A. rufinervis

Binomial name
- Aglaia rufinervis (Blume) Bentv.

Species of tree

Aglaia rufinervis is a species of tree in the family Meliaceae. It is native to Thailand, Peninsular Malaysia, Singapore, Sumatra, Borneo and Java.
