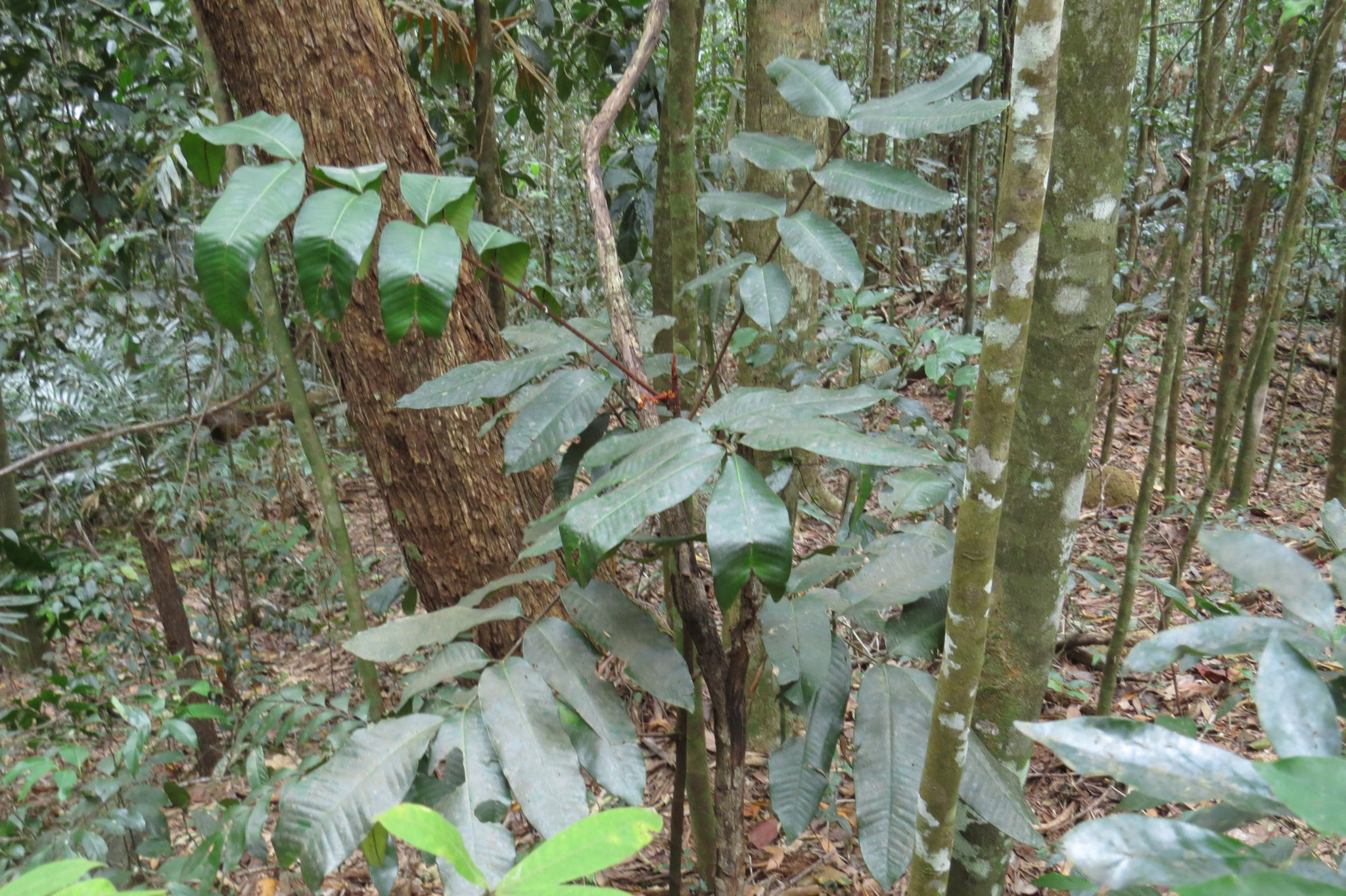
- In or near Daintree National Park, Australia

Conservation status
- Near Threatened (IUCN 2.3)

Scientific classification
- Kingdom: Plantae
- Clade: Tracheophytes
- Clade: Angiosperms
- Clade: Eudicots
- Clade: Rosids
- Order: Sapindales
- Family: Meliaceae
- Genus: Aglaia
- Species: A. meridionalis

Binomial name
- Aglaia meridionalis Pannell

= Aglaia meridionalis =

Species of flowering plant

Aglaia meridionalis is a species of plant in the family Meliaceae. It is endemic to Queensland, Australia.
