= Aglaia beccarii =

Scientific classification
- Kingdom: Plantae
- Clade: Tracheophytes
- Clade: Angiosperms
- Clade: Eudicots
- Clade: Rosids
- Order: Sapindales
- Family: Meliaceae
- Genus: Aglaia
- Species: A. beccarii

Binomial name
- Aglaia beccarii C.DC.

Species of tree

Aglaia beccarii is a tree in the family Meliaceae. It grows up to 25 metres (80 ft) tall with a trunk diameter of up to 30 centimetres (12 in). The bark is greyish brown, greenish brown or white. The fruits are pink or reddish purple. The tree is named for the Italian botanist Odoardo Beccari. Habitat is forests from sea-level to 1,500 metres (5,000 ft) altitude. A. beccarii is found in Borneo and the Philippines.
