= Aglaia laxiflora =

Conservation status
- Vulnerable (IUCN 2.3)

Scientific classification
- Kingdom: Plantae
- Clade: Tracheophytes
- Clade: Angiosperms
- Clade: Eudicots
- Clade: Rosids
- Order: Sapindales
- Family: Meliaceae
- Genus: Aglaia
- Species: A. laxiflora

Binomial name
- Aglaia laxiflora Miq.

Species of flowering plant

Aglaia laxiflora is a tree species in the family Meliaceae. It is native to Borneo, excluding the region that is the Malaysian state of Sarawak, an island located north of Australia at the geographic centre of Maritime Southeast Asia and is divided between the countries of Brunei Darussalam, Indonesia and Malaysia.

Aglaia laxiflora is primarily restricted to forest and to periodically inundated dipterocarp forest. The tree is considered a vulnerable species as its habitat is continuously lost.
