= Aglaia flavescens =

Conservation status
- Vulnerable (IUCN 2.3)

Scientific classification
- Kingdom: Plantae
- Clade: Tracheophytes
- Clade: Angiosperms
- Clade: Eudicots
- Clade: Rosids
- Order: Sapindales
- Family: Meliaceae
- Genus: Aglaia
- Species: A. flavescens

Binomial name
- Aglaia flavescens Candolle

Species of flowering plant

Aglaia flavescens is a species of plant in the family Meliaceae. It is found in Indonesia and Papua New Guinea.

The species was first identified and described by Swiss botanist Casimir de Candolle.

It grow primarily in wet tropical biomes and has a dioecious sexual system.
