= Aglaia luzoniensis =

Conservation status
- Near Threatened (IUCN 2.3)

Scientific classification
- Kingdom: Plantae
- Clade: Tracheophytes
- Clade: Angiosperms
- Clade: Eudicots
- Clade: Rosids
- Order: Sapindales
- Family: Meliaceae
- Genus: Aglaia
- Species: A. luzoniensis

Binomial name
- Aglaia luzoniensis (S.Vidal) Merr. & Rolfe

Species of flowering plant

Aglaia luzoniensis is a species of plant in the family Meliaceae. It is found in Indonesia and the Philippines. It can grow up to 10 meters tall and its bole can be up to 15 centimeters of diameter.
