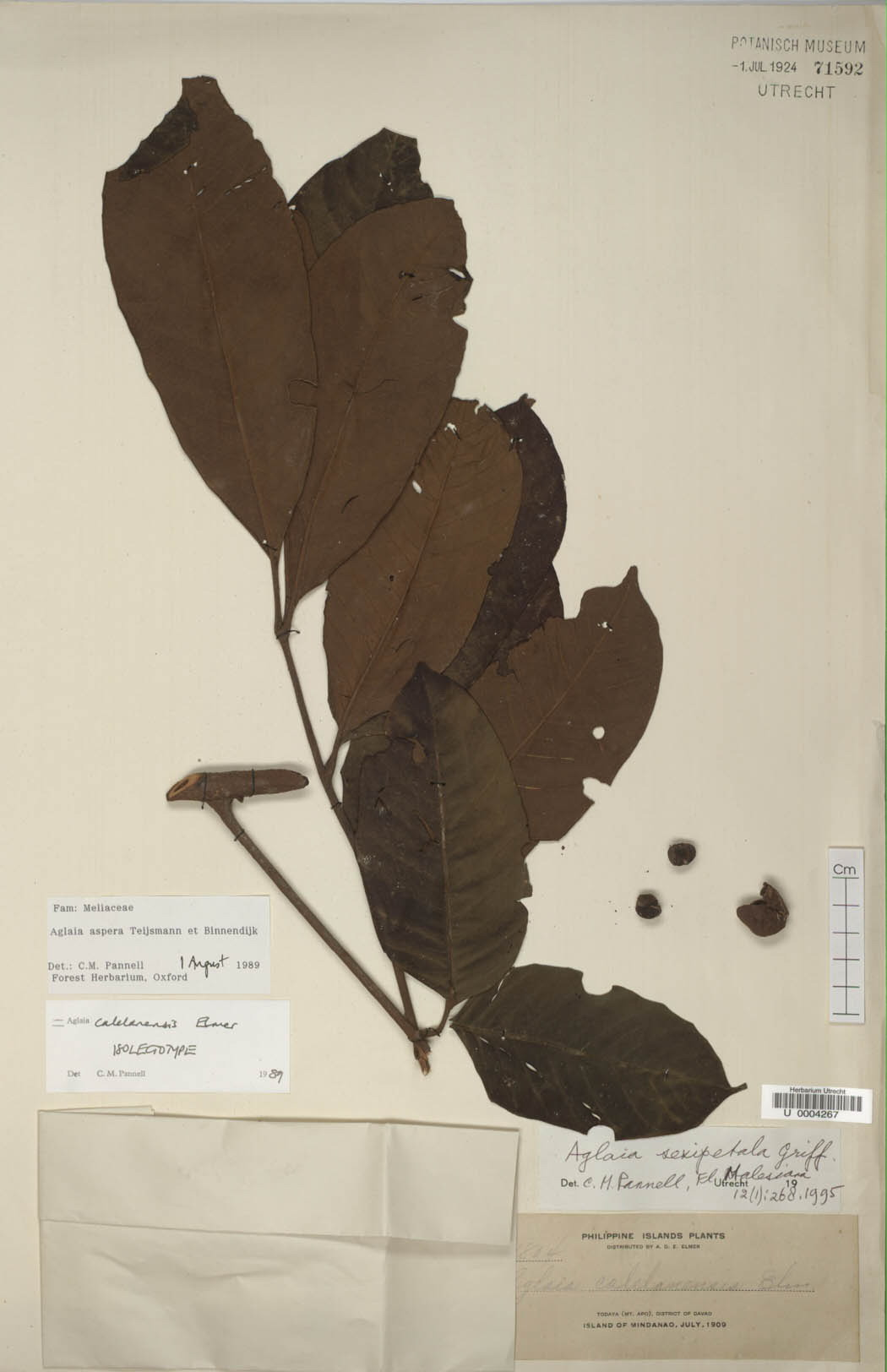
- Herbarium specimen of Aglaia sexipetala

Conservation status
- Near Threatened (IUCN 2.3)

Scientific classification
- Kingdom: Plantae
- Clade: Tracheophytes
- Clade: Angiosperms
- Clade: Eudicots
- Clade: Rosids
- Order: Sapindales
- Family: Meliaceae
- Genus: Aglaia
- Species: A. sexipetala

Binomial name
- Aglaia sexipetala Pannell

= Aglaia sexipetala =

Species of flowering plant

Aglaia sexipetala is a species of plant in the family Meliaceae. It is found in Indonesia, Malaysia, Papua New Guinea, Singapore, Thailand, and possibly the Philippines.
