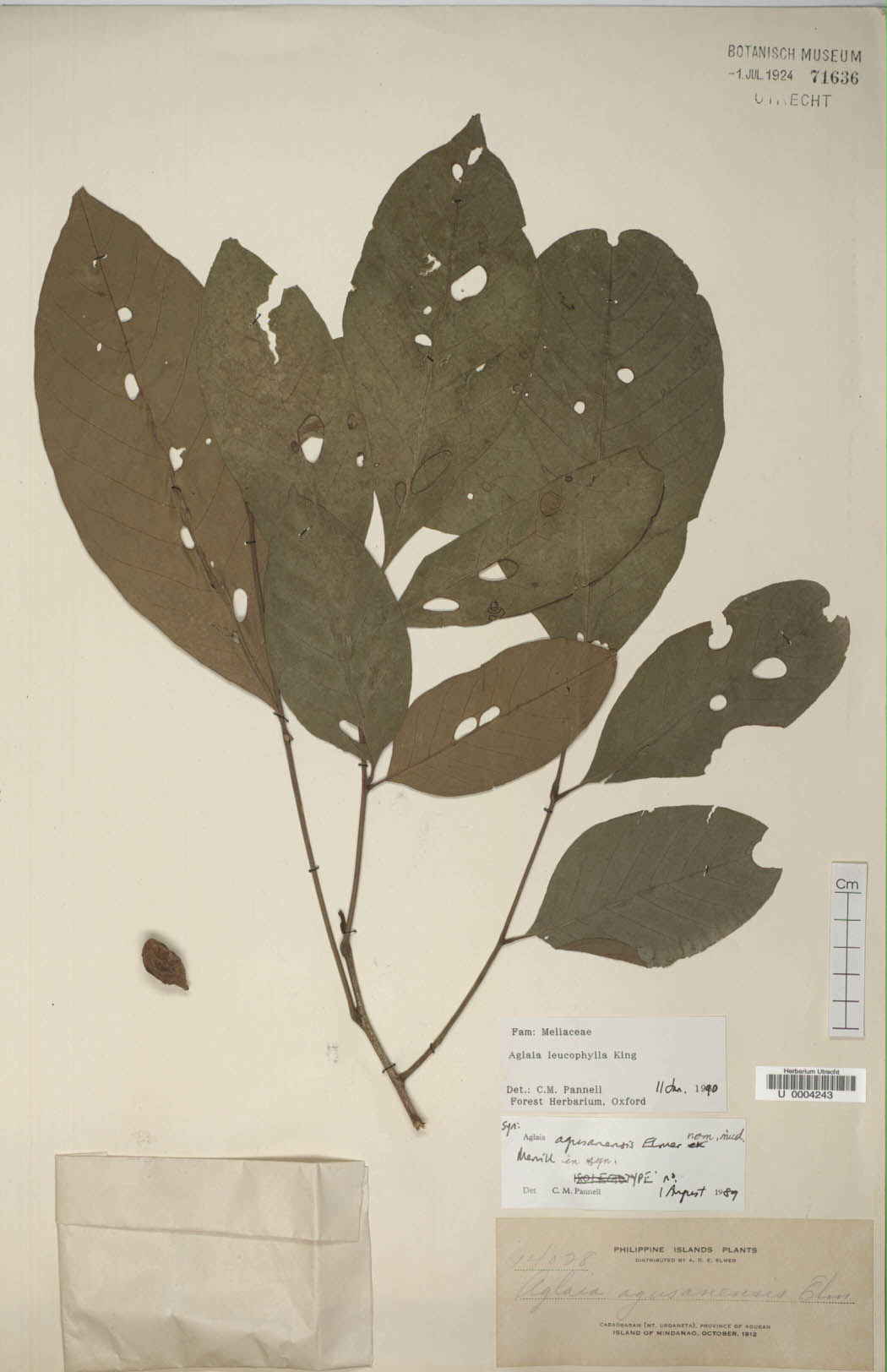
- Herbarium specimen of Aglaia leucophylla

Conservation status
- Least Concern (IUCN 3.1)

Scientific classification
- Kingdom: Plantae
- Clade: Tracheophytes
- Clade: Angiosperms
- Clade: Eudicots
- Clade: Rosids
- Order: Sapindales
- Family: Meliaceae
- Genus: Aglaia
- Species: A. leucophylla

Binomial name
- Aglaia leucophylla King

Synonyms
- Aglaia agusanensis Elmer ex Merr.; Aglaia elmeri Merr.; Aglaia heteroclita King; Aglaia insignis O.Schwartz; Aglaia kunstleri King; Aglaia mirandae Merr.; Aglaia pallida Merr.; Aglaia simplex Merr.

= Aglaia leucophylla =

Species of flowering plant

Aglaia leucophylla is a species of flowering plant in the family Meliaceae. It is found in Brunei, Indonesia, Malaysia, the Philippines, and Thailand.
