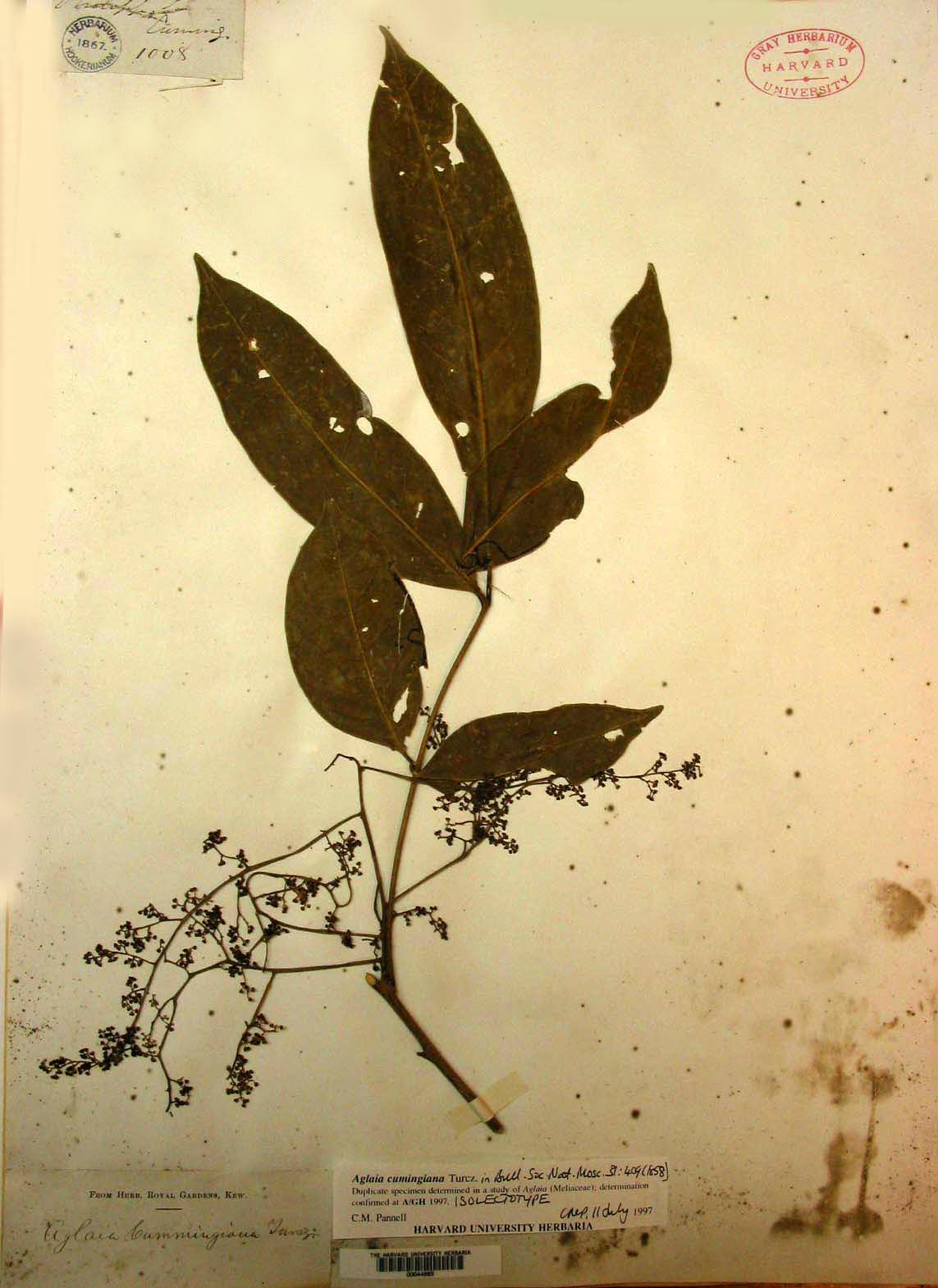
- Herbarium specimen of Aglaia cumingiana

Conservation status
- Least Concern (IUCN 3.1)

Scientific classification
- Kingdom: Plantae
- Clade: Tracheophytes
- Clade: Angiosperms
- Clade: Eudicots
- Clade: Rosids
- Order: Sapindales
- Family: Meliaceae
- Genus: Aglaia
- Species: A. cumingiana

Binomial name
- Aglaia cumingiana Turcz.

= Aglaia cumingiana =

Species of flowering plant

The alauihau (Aglaia cumingiana), also known as balbalan-amo is a species of plant in the family Meliaceae. It is found in Brunei, Malaysia, and the Philippines. It was first described in 1858 by Turcz.
