= Aglaia smithii =

Conservation status
- Near Threatened (IUCN 3.1)

Scientific classification
- Kingdom: Plantae
- Clade: Tracheophytes
- Clade: Angiosperms
- Clade: Eudicots
- Clade: Rosids
- Order: Sapindales
- Family: Meliaceae
- Genus: Aglaia
- Species: A. smithii

Binomial name
- Aglaia smithii Koord.

Synonyms
- Aglaia badia Merr.; Aglaia bicolor Merr.; Aglaia ramosii Quisumb.

Species of flowering plant

Aglaia smithii is a species of flowering plant in the family Meliaceae. It is found in Indonesia and the Philippines.
