= Aglaia coriacea =

Conservation status
- Vulnerable (IUCN 2.3)

Scientific classification
- Kingdom: Plantae
- Clade: Tracheophytes
- Clade: Angiosperms
- Clade: Eudicots
- Clade: Rosids
- Order: Sapindales
- Family: Meliaceae
- Genus: Aglaia
- Species: A. coriacea

Binomial name
- Aglaia coriacea Korth. ex Miq.

Species of flowering plant

Aglaia coriacea is a species of plant in the family Meliaceae. It is found in Kalimantan, Indonesia, and Peninsular Malaysia.
