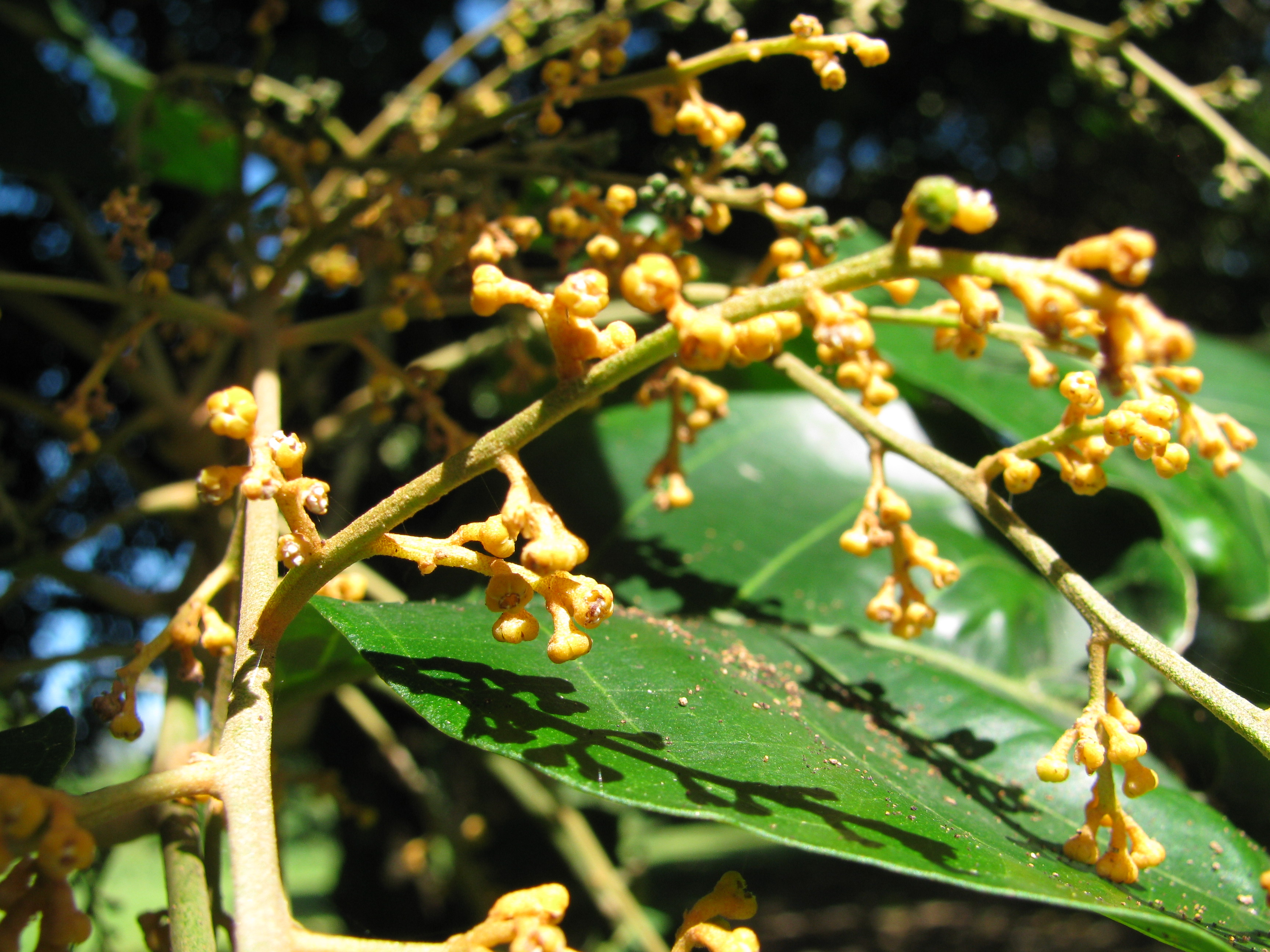

Conservation status
- Least Concern (IUCN 3.1)

Scientific classification
- Kingdom: Plantae
- Clade: Tracheophytes
- Clade: Angiosperms
- Clade: Eudicots
- Clade: Rosids
- Order: Sapindales
- Family: Meliaceae
- Genus: Aglaia
- Species: A. saltatorum

Binomial name
- Aglaia saltatorum A.C.Sm.

= Aglaia saltatorum =

Species of flowering plant

Aglaia saltatorum is a species of plant in the family Meliaceae. It is found in Fiji, Niue, the Solomon Islands, Tonga, Vanuatu, and Wallis and Futuna Islands.
