= Aglaia odoratissima =

Conservation status
- Least Concern (IUCN 3.1)

Scientific classification
- Kingdom: Plantae
- Clade: Tracheophytes
- Clade: Angiosperms
- Clade: Eudicots
- Clade: Rosids
- Order: Sapindales
- Family: Meliaceae
- Genus: Aglaia
- Species: A. odoratissima

Binomial name
- Aglaia odoratissima Blume

Synonyms
- Aglaia affinis Merr.; Aglaia cuspidella Ridl.; Aglaia diepenhorstii Miq.; Aglaia fraseri Ridl.; Aglaia heterophylla Merr.; Aglaia luzoniensis var. trifoliata Merr. & Rolfe; Aglaia odoratissima var. forbesii Baker f.; Aglaia odoratissima var. parvifolia Koord. & Valeton; Aglaia odoratissima var. pauciflora Koord. & Valeton; Aglaia paniculata Kurz; Milnea blumei Teijsm. & Binn.

Species of flowering plant

Aglaia odoratissima is a species of plant in the family Meliaceae. It is a tree native to parts of mainland Southeast Asia (Myanmar, Thailand, and Vietnam), the Nicobar Islands, and Malesia (Borneo, Java, the Lesser Sunda Islands, Peninsular Malaysia, Philippines, Sulawesi, and Sumatra).
