= Aglaia cucullata =

Conservation status
- Data Deficient (IUCN 3.1)

Scientific classification
- Kingdom: Plantae
- Clade: Tracheophytes
- Clade: Angiosperms
- Clade: Eudicots
- Clade: Rosids
- Order: Sapindales
- Family: Meliaceae
- Genus: Aglaia
- Species: A. cucullata

Binomial name
- Aglaia cucullata (Roxb.) Pellegr.

Synonyms
- Aglaia tripetala Merr.; Amoora aherniana Merr.; Amoora auriculata Miq.; Amoora conduplifolia Elmer nom. inval.; Amoora cucullata Roxb.; Amoora laxa Wight & Arn.; Andersonia cucullata Roxb.; Aphanamixis cucullata (Roxb.) M.R.Almeida; Buchanania paniculata Roxb. ex Steud.; Buchanania spicata Roxb. ex Wall. nom. inval.

Species of flowering plant

Aglaia cucullata, also called Pacific maple, is a species of plant in the family Meliaceae. It is found in Bangladesh, India, Indonesia, Malaysia, Myanmar, Nepal, Papua New Guinea, the Philippines, Singapore, Thailand, and Vietnam.
