= Aglaia sapindina =

Conservation status
- Least Concern (IUCN 2.3)

Scientific classification
- Kingdom: Plantae
- Clade: Tracheophytes
- Clade: Angiosperms
- Clade: Eudicots
- Clade: Rosids
- Order: Sapindales
- Family: Meliaceae
- Genus: Aglaia
- Species: A. sapindina

Binomial name
- Aglaia sapindina (F. V. Mueller) Harms

Species of tree

Aglaia sapindina is a species of plant in the family Meliaceae. It is found in Australia (Northern Territory and Queensland), Indonesia, Papua New Guinea, and the Solomon Islands.
