= Aglaia leucoclada =

Conservation status
- Vulnerable (IUCN 3.1)

Scientific classification
- Kingdom: Plantae
- Clade: Tracheophytes
- Clade: Angiosperms
- Clade: Eudicots
- Clade: Rosids
- Order: Sapindales
- Family: Meliaceae
- Genus: Aglaia
- Species: A. leucoclada

Binomial name
- Aglaia leucoclada C.DC.

Species of flowering plant

Aglaia leucoclada is an understorey tree in the family Meliaceae. It is endemic to Papua New Guinea.

The main threat to this species is the destruction of its habitat.

The specific epithet, leucoclada, derives from two Greek words: leucos (white) and clados (shoot/sprout) which were combined to give leucocladus, - a, -um, describing the plant as having white shoots.
