= Aglaia cooperae =

Cooper's Aglaia

Conservation status
- Least Concern (NCA)

Scientific classification
- Kingdom: Plantae
- Clade: Tracheophytes
- Clade: Angiosperms
- Clade: Eudicots
- Clade: Rosids
- Order: Sapindales
- Family: Meliaceae
- Genus: Aglaia
- Species: A. cooperae

Binomial name
- Aglaia cooperae Pannell

Species of flowering plant

Aglaia cooperae, commonly known as Cooper's aglaia, is a small tree growing to about 4–6 m (13–20 ft) tall in the mahogany family Meliaceae. Twigs, leaves, leaf stalks, flowering and fruiting structures, the outside surfaces of the petals, calices and fruit are all covered in a dense reddish brown indumentum.

It was first described in 2008 by the British botanist Caroline Mary Pannell, and is only found in a very small area, to the east of the McIlwraith Range on Cape York Peninsula, Queensland, Australia.

== Conservation ==
This species is listed by the Queensland Government's Department of Environment, Science and Innovation as least concern. As of 25 March 2024, it has not been assessed by the International Union for Conservation of Nature (IUCN).
