= N. Sasidharan =

Indian botanist (born 1952)

N. Sasidharan (born 1952) is an Indian botanist.
