= Diospyros pyrrhocarpa =

Scientific classification
- Kingdom: Plantae
- Clade: Tracheophytes
- Clade: Angiosperms
- Clade: Eudicots
- Clade: Asterids
- Order: Ericales
- Family: Ebenaceae
- Genus: Diospyros
- Species: D. pyrrhocarpa

Binomial name
- Diospyros pyrrhocarpa Miq.

Synonyms
- Diospyros ahernii Merr.; Diospyros asterocalyx Hiern; Diospyros reflexa King & Gamble

Species of tree

Diospyros pyrrhocarpa is a tree in the family Ebenaceae. It grows up to 23 metres (80 ft) tall. Twigs dry greyish to brownish. Inflorescences bear up to three flowers. The fruits are roundish to ovoid-ellipsoid, up to 5 cm (2 in) in diameter. The specific epithet pyrrhocarpa is from the Greek meaning 'fiery red or yellow fruits'. Habitat is lowland mixed dipterocarp forests. D. pyrrhocarpa ranges from the Andaman and Nicobar Islands through Thailand, Peninsular Malaysia, Sumatra, and Borneo to the Philippines. In Cebu and Negros Regions in the Philippines, the tree is commonly known as Kunalum.
