= Aglaia sessilifolia =

Scientific classification
- Kingdom: Plantae
- Clade: Embryophytes
- Clade: Tracheophytes
- Clade: Angiosperms
- Clade: Eudicots
- Clade: Rosids
- Order: Sapindales
- Family: Meliaceae
- Genus: Aglaia
- Species: A. sessilifolia

Binomial name
- Aglaia sessilifolia Pannell

Species of tree

Aglaia sessilifolia is a tree in the family Meliaceae. It grows up to 12 metres (40 ft) tall with a trunk diameter of up to 20 centimetres (8 in). The bark is greyish brown or dark brown. The flowers are yellow. The fruits are ellipsoid, up to 2.5 cm (1 in) long. The specific epithet sessilifolia is from the Latin meaning 'stalkless leaf'. Habitat is limestone hill forests from sea level to 1,000 metres (3,300 ft) altitude. A. sessilifolia is endemic to Borneo and confined to Malaysia's Sabah state.
