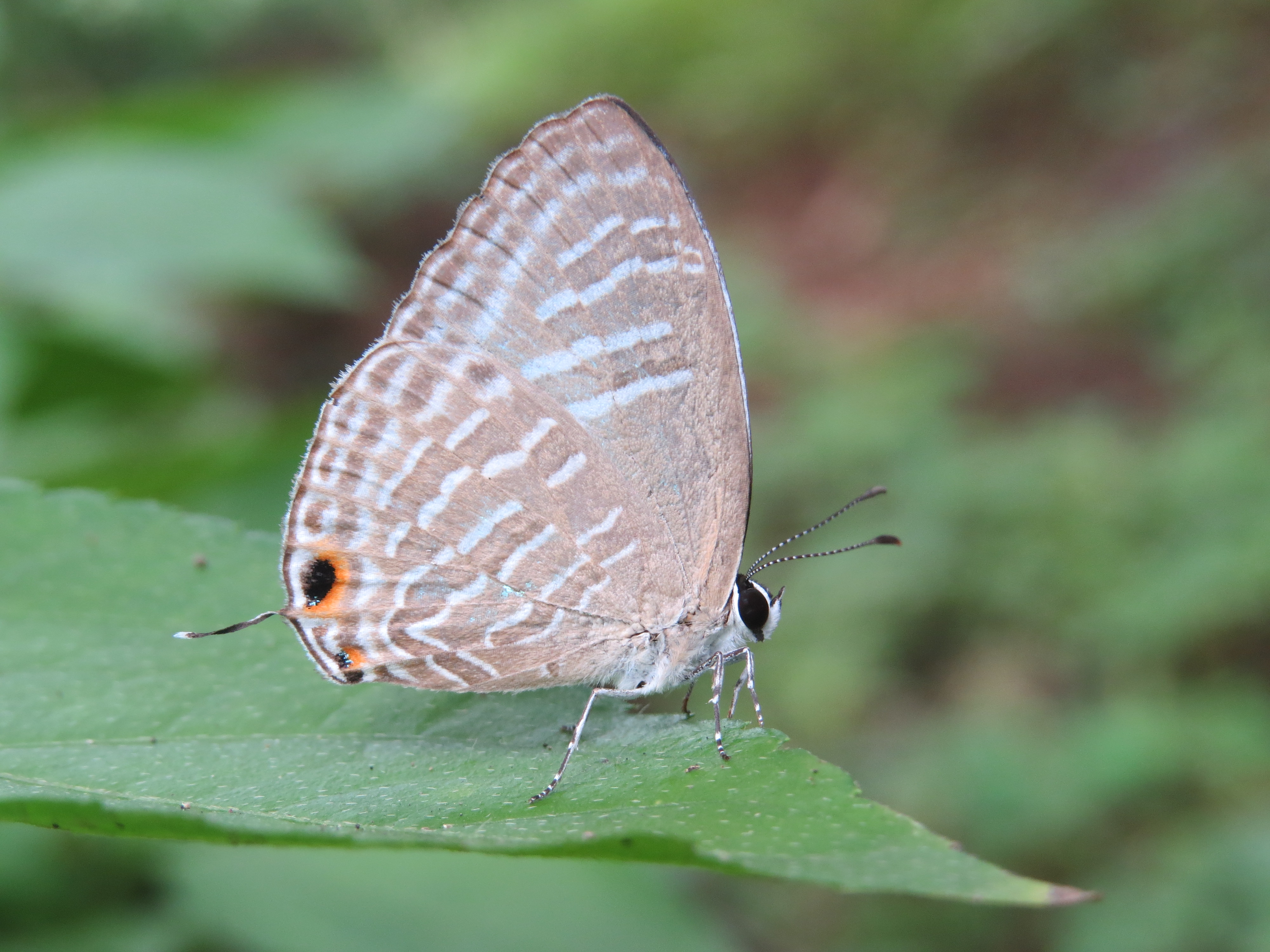
- At Parambikulam, Kerala, India
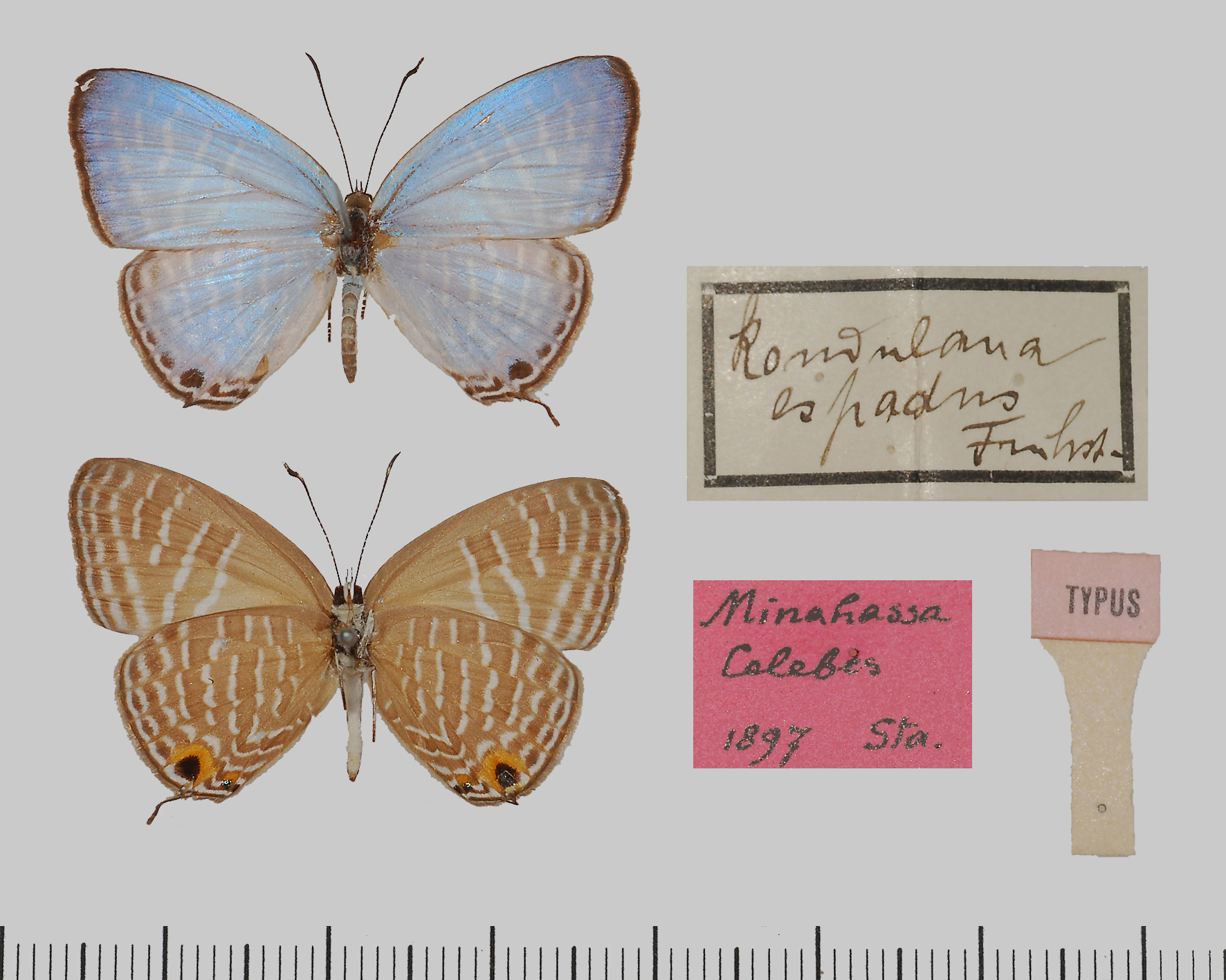
- Jamides Alecto espada Lectotype Courvoisier Collection, Basel

Scientific classification
- Kingdom: Animalia
- Phylum: Arthropoda
- Clade: Pancrustacea
- Class: Insecta
- Order: Lepidoptera
- Family: Lycaenidae
- Genus: Jamides
- Species: J. alecto

Binomial name
- Jamides alecto (C. Felder 1860)

= Jamides alecto =

Metallic cerulean

Species of butterfly

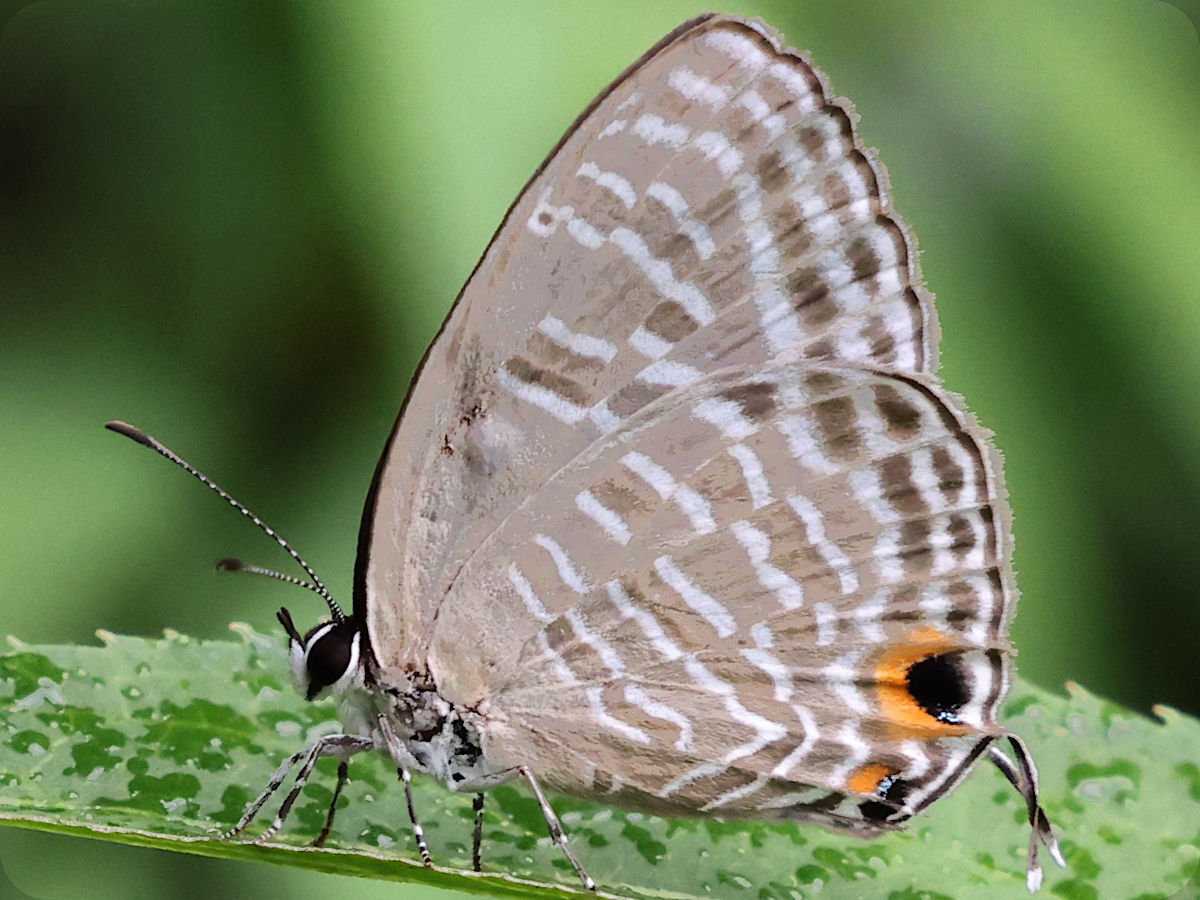
J. a. dromicus, Taiwan

Jamides alecto, the metallic cerulean, is a small species of butterfly found in the Indomalayan realm but which crosses the Wallace line into the Australasian realm (Celebes). It belongs to the lycaenids or blues family.

== Description ==
Charles Swinhoe described the subspecies J. a. alocina on 1915 as follows: "Upperside milky white tinged with pale lavender-blue, the inner surface of the fore wing and the upper half of the hind wing palest: fore wing with a fine grey costal line; a grey marginal narrow band: hind wing with a submarginal series of small and short black lunular marks, edged with white on both sides, and a fine black marginal line. Under-side pale pinkish grey, markings white but indistinct: fore wing with two lines across the end of the cell, continued to the hinder margin beyond its middle, two dislocated lines beyond in the fourth, fifth, and sixth interspaces, with a line in the third interspace from between the last two; two rows of submarginal lines and an indistinct marginal line, all three dislocated by the veins: hind wing with three rows of transverse double lines at equal distances apart, and a marginal series, all dislocated by the veins; a brownish spot touched with red near the anal angle."

== Subspecies ==
- J. a. alecto Moluccas
- J. a. kondulana (Felder, 1862) Nicobars
- J. a. latimargus (Snellen, 1878) Sulawesi
- J. a. elpidion (Doherty, 1891) Enggano
- J. a. mentawica (Hagen, 1902) Mentawai
- J. a. dromicus (Fruhstorfer, 1910) Taiwan
- J. a. alocina Swinhoe, 1915 Sri Lanka, South India - Myanmar, Thailand, Laos, S.China, Malay Peninsula
- J. a. espada (Fruhstorfer, 1916) Sulawesi
- J. a. eurysaces (Fruhstorfer, 1916) North India, Assam - Thailand
- J. a. meilichius (Fruhstorfer, 1916) Ceylon
- J. a. thanetus (Fruhstorfer, 1916) Nias
- J. a. ozea (Fruhstorfer, 1916) Sikkim
- J. a. ageladas (Fruhstorfer, 1916) Sumatra
- J. a. alvenus (Fruhstorfer, 1916) Selajar
- J. a. horsfieldi (Toxopeus, 1929) Java
- J. a. simalurana (Toxopeus, 1930) Simalue
- J. a. luniger (Toxopeus, 1930) Sulawesi
- J. a. manilana (Toxopeus, 1930) Philippines
- J. a. fusca Evans, 1932 Andamans
- J. a. kawazoei Hayashi, [1977] Palawan

The larva feeds on Elettaria cardamomum, Hevea, Pueraria, Alpinia, Boesenbergia, Curcuma, Elettaria, Hedychium, Kaempferia and Zingiber attended by ants.

== See also ==
- List of butterflies of India
- List of butterflies of India (Lycaenidae)
