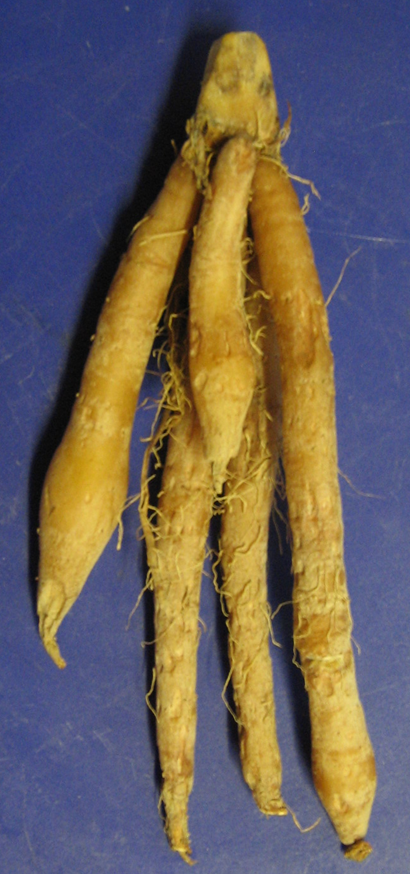

Scientific classification
- Kingdom: Plantae
- Clade: Tracheophytes
- Clade: Angiosperms
- Clade: Monocots
- Clade: Commelinids
- Order: Zingiberales
- Family: Zingiberaceae
- Genus: Boesenbergia
- Species: B. rotunda

Binomial name
- Boesenbergia rotunda (L.) Mansf.

Synonyms
- Boesenbergia cochinchinensis (Gagnep.) Loes.; Boesenbergia pandurata (Roxb.) Schltr.; Curcuma rotunda L.; Gastrochilus panduratus (Roxb.) Ridl.; Gastrochilus rotundus (L.) Alston; Kaempferia cochinchinensis Gagnep.; Kaempferia ovata Roscoe; Kaempferia pandurata Roxb.

= Boesenbergia rotunda =

Species of flowering medicinal and culinary plant

Boesenbergia rotunda (Thai: กระชาย, romanized: krachai, Khmer: ខ្ជាយ, romanized: k'jeay, Indonesian: temu kunci, Burmese: ဆိတ္ဖူး, romanized: Hsei' Hpu), commonly known as Chinese keys, fingerroot, lesser galangal or Chinese ginger, is a medicinal and culinary herb from China and Southeast Asia. In English, the root has traditionally been called fingerroot, because the shape of the rhizome resembles that of fingers growing out of a central piece.

== Description ==
Fingerroot is a kind of ginger (Zingiberaceae). It is an annual crop and indigenous to southern Yunnan Province, China, to west Malaysia, growing in tropical rain forest. It has an underground stem, known as a rhizome. This spreads into many bunches in the same way as banana, ginger, galangal and turmeric. These structures accumulate nutrients and the middle part is more swollen than the head and bottom part. The inner part has a range of colours and aromas depending on the variety of fingerroot. The above-ground part is composed of a leaf stalk that has a sheath covering it. The leaf sheaths are red, the blades are oval in shape and the apex of leaves are sharp. Chinese ginger is a herbaceous plant with a height of 61–91 centimetres (2–3 ft). The leaf is about 50 cm (20 in) long and 12 cm (4.7 in) wide. The middle of the petioles are deeply grooved. The flower appears between the leaf sheaths at the bottom of the trunk. The petals are white or light pink. Flowers bloom one at a time.

== Common names ==
- Khmer: kcheay (ខ្ជាយ)
- Indonesian: temu kunci
- Javanese: kunci
- Meitei: yai-macha
- Myanmar: Hsei' Hpu (ဆိတ္ဖူး)
- Sinhalese: haran kaha (හරං කහ)
- Thai: krachai (กระชาย)
- Vietnamese: ngải bún, nga truật

== Uses ==
Fingerroot is known as temu kunci in Indonesian. It is widely used in Javanese cuisine in Indonesia.

In addition to its culinary uses, it is also specifically used as a spice, or as flavoring agents, dyes, or traditional medicine. After its discovery, B. rotunda has been used as research material in rat studies and microbiological studies.

In Thai cooking, fingerroot is called krachai (Thai: กระชาย; pronounced [krà.tɕʰāːj]) and is an ingredient in dishes such as kaeng tai pla. It is used in some kroeung pastes of Cambodian cuisine and is known as k'cheay (Khmer: ខ្ជាយ). In the west it is usually found pickled or frozen. The rhizomes are commonly used as vegetables in main dishes or eaten raw when young. It is also used to help make fermented soya bean cake, also called tempeh, a traditional Indonesian food. Its roots and rhizomes are cultivated in Indonesia, Indochina, and India in small homes and is also popularly used in flavorful curry dishes. Fingerroot is also incorporated into tonic mixtures such as the famous Indonesian tonic jamu.

It is sometimes confused with Alpinia officinarum, another plant in the family Zingiberaceae which is also known as lesser galangal.

== Gallery ==
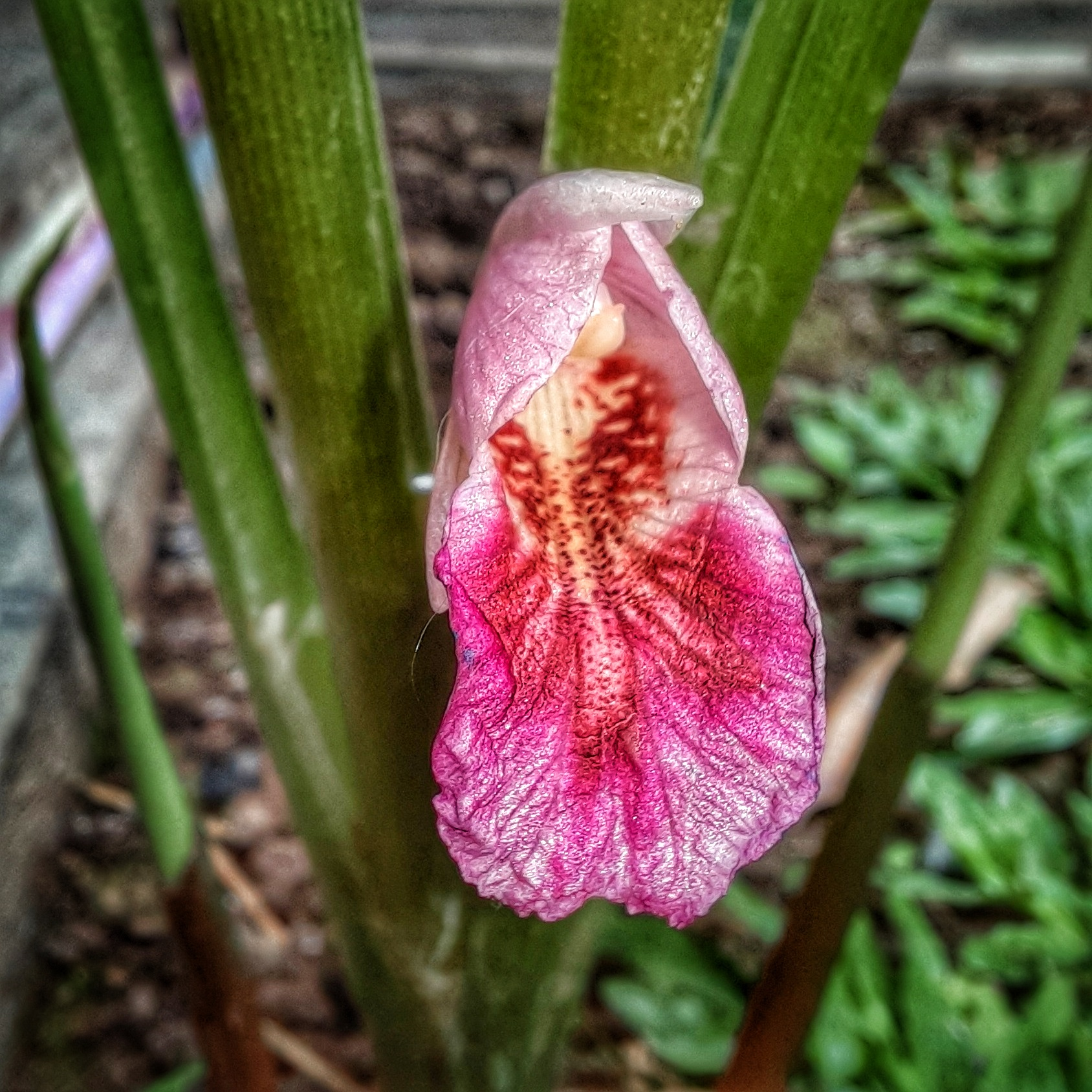
The flower of a fingerroot (frontal view)

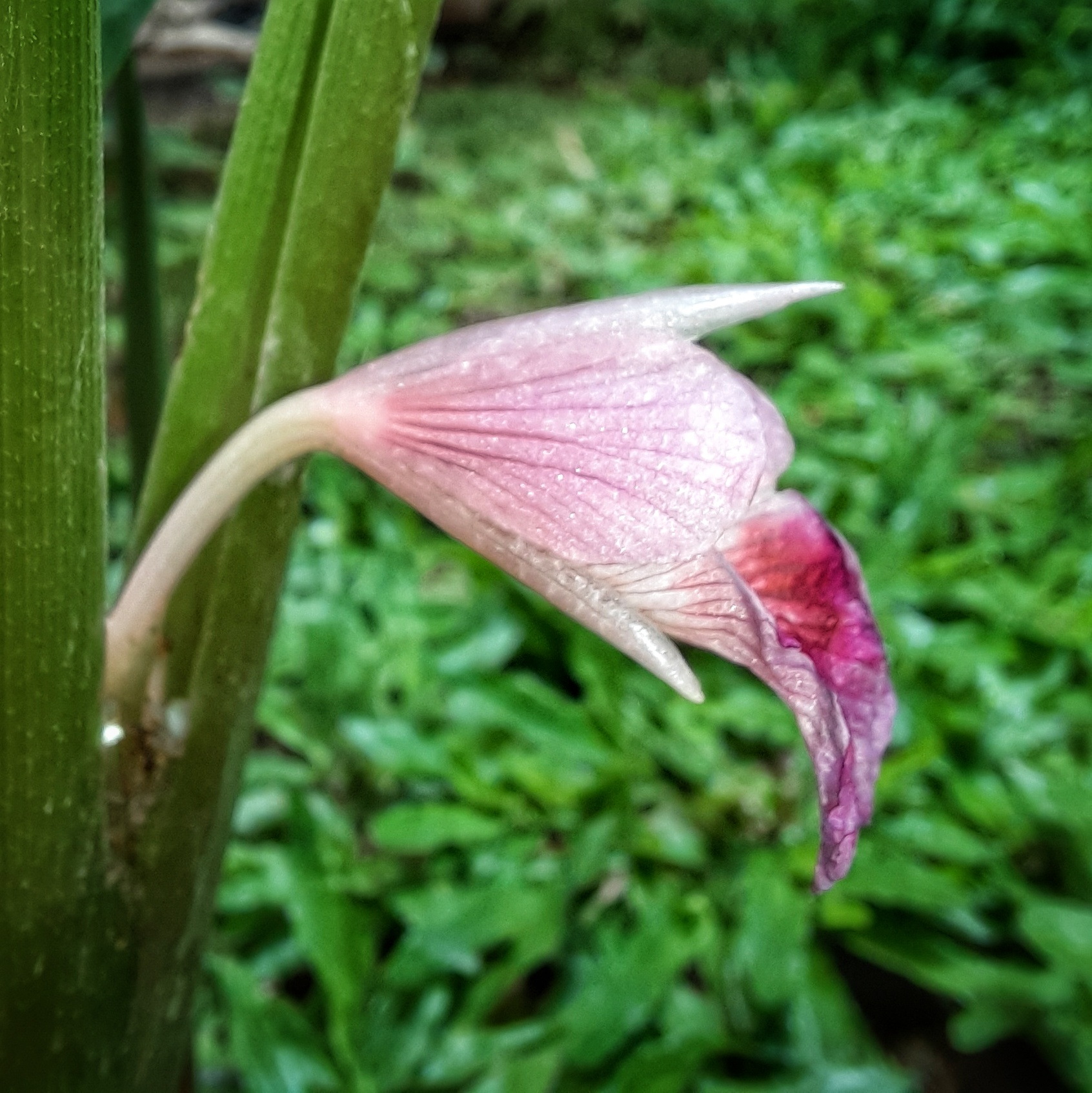
The flower of a fingerroot (side view)

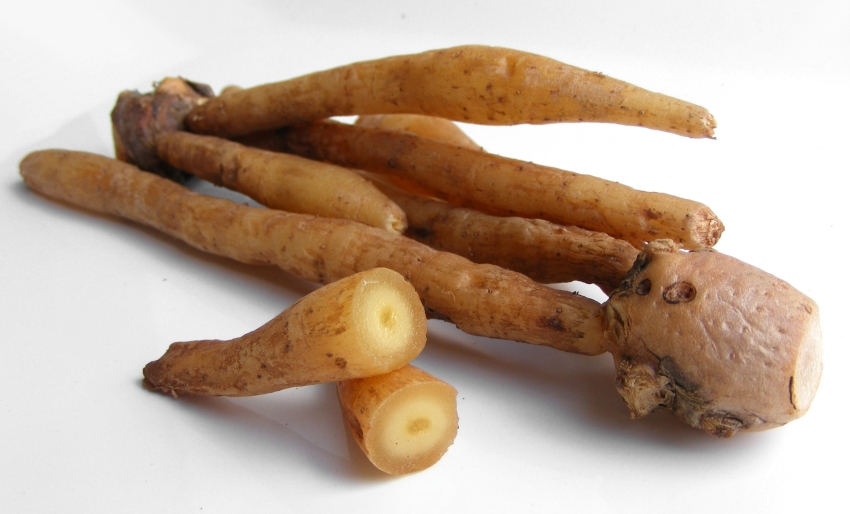
Fingerroot rhizome

== See also ==
- Alpinia galanga
- Domesticated plants and animals of Austronesia
- Hedychium spicatum
- Zingiber spectabile
