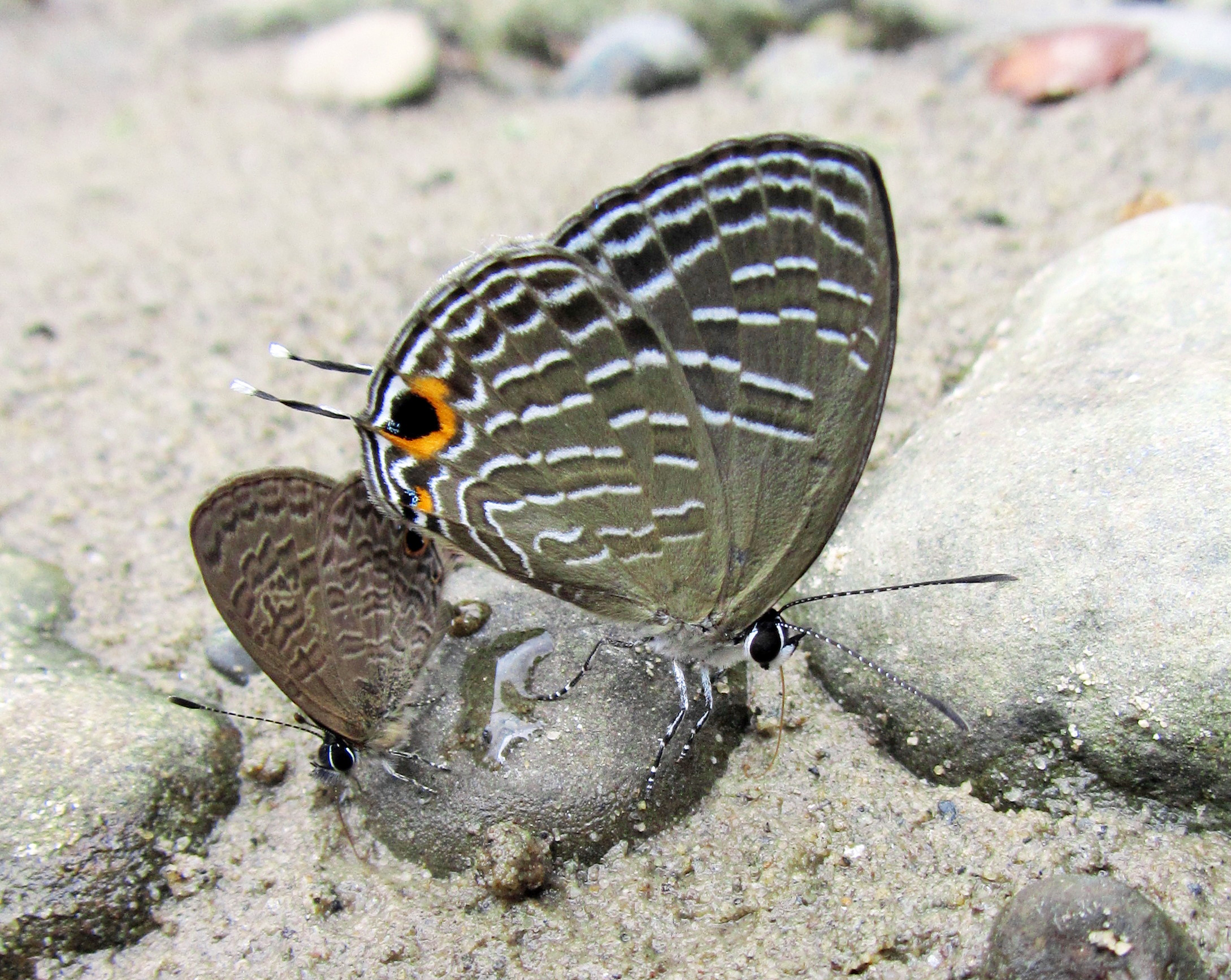
- Underside
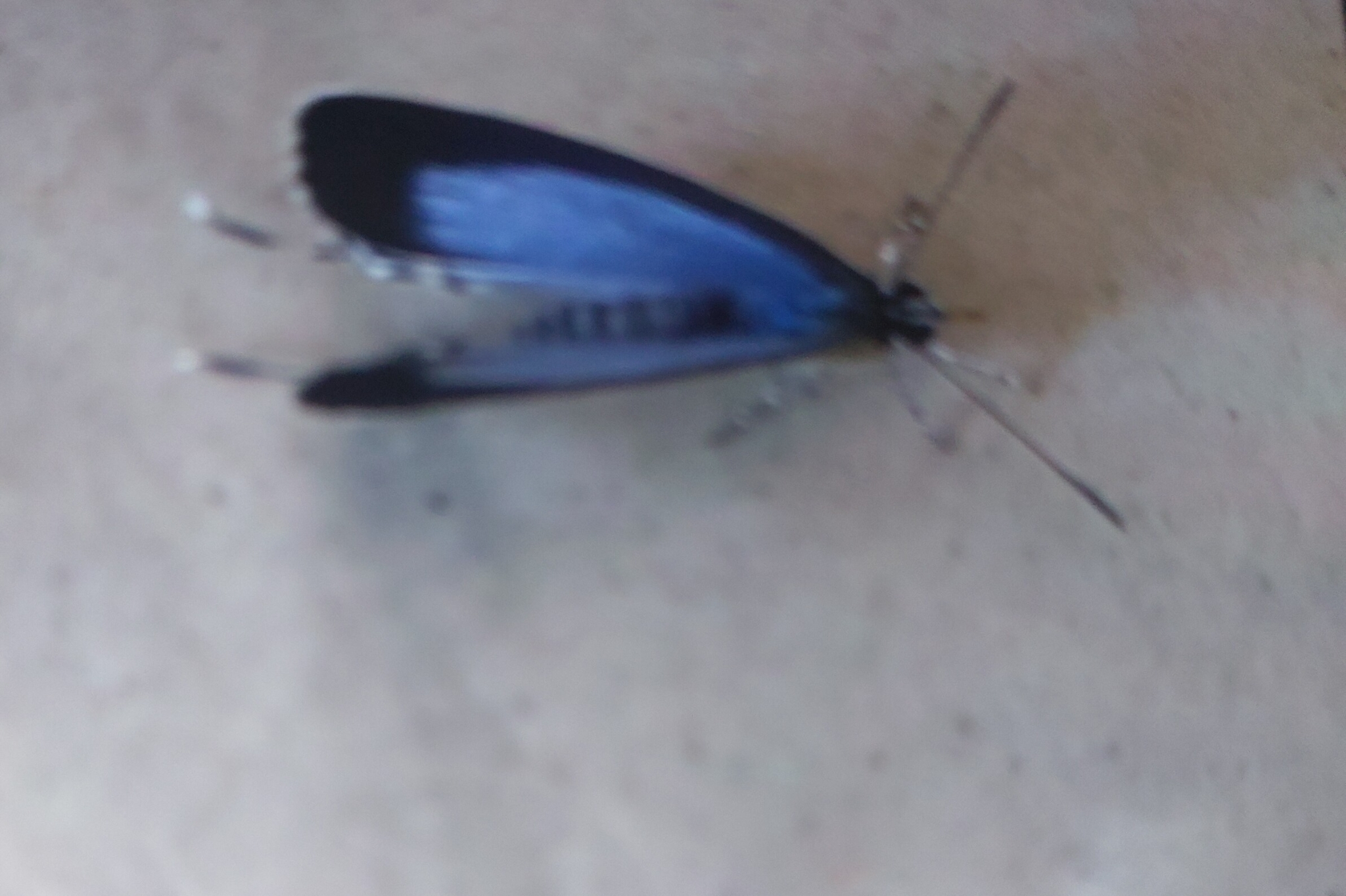
- Upperside

Scientific classification
- Kingdom: Animalia
- Phylum: Arthropoda
- Class: Insecta
- Order: Lepidoptera
- Family: Lycaenidae
- Genus: Jamides
- Species: J. elpis

Binomial name
- Jamides elpis (Godart, [1824])

Synonyms
- Polyommatus elpis Godart, [1824]; Lampides elpis ab. chinee Tytler, 1912; Lampides kondulana phaliga Fruhstorfer, 1916; Lampides kondulana sydra Fruhstorfer, 1916; Lampides kondulana baweana Fruhstorfer, 1916; Lampides kondulana gerra Fruhstorfer, 1916; Lampides pseudelpis Butler, 1879; Lampides atina Fruhstorfer, 1916; Lampides kondulana saunda Fruhstorfer, 1916; Lampides kondulana comeda Fruhstorfer, 1916

= Jamides elpis =

Glistening cerulean

Species of butterfly

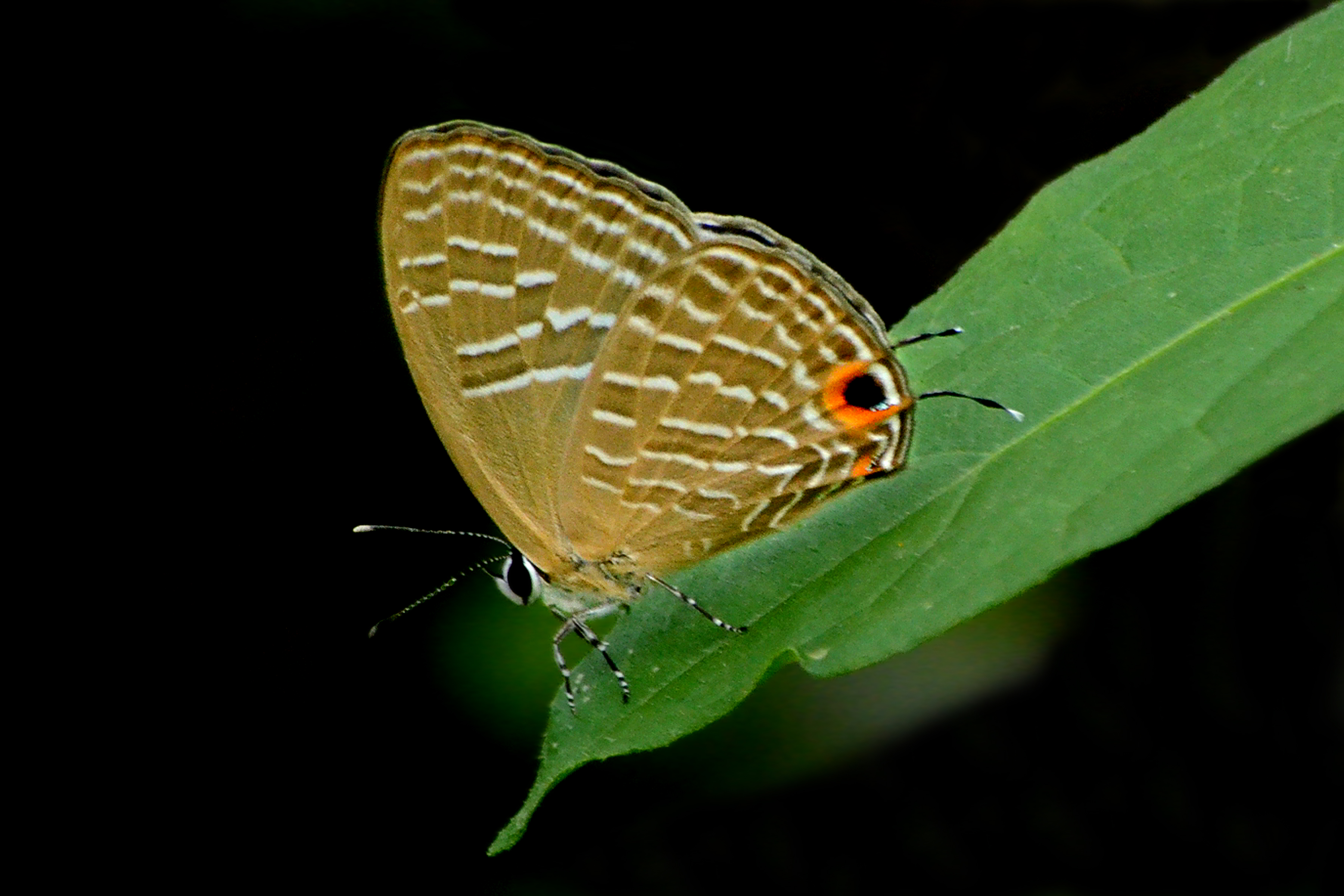
Close wing position of Jamides elpis Godart, 1824 – Glistening Cerulean

Jamides elpis, the glistening cerulean, is a butterfly in the family Lycaenidae. It was described by Jean Baptiste Godart in 1824. It is found in the Indomalayan realm. Beneath with almost purely white stripes; in eastern specimens these stripes beneath are very finely darkened with a whitish grey. The larger specimens belong to the rainy season, whilst those of the dry season are distinguished more by their small size than by a different colouring or marking.

The larvae feed on Lepisanthes, Boesenbergia and Elettaria species.

== Subspecies ==
- Jamides elpis elpis (western Java)
- Jamides elpis sydra (Fruhstorfer, 1916) (eastern Java)
- Jamides elpis baweana (Fruhstorfer, 1916) (Bawean)
- Jamides elpis gerra (Fruhstorfer, 1916) (Palawan)
- Jamides elpis pseudelpis (Butler, 1879) (Burma, Thailand to Singapore)
- Jamides elpis saunda (Fruhstorfer, 1916) (Obi)
- Jamides elpis comeda (Fruhstorfer, 1916) (Tanahdjampea)
