= Boesenbergia magna =

Scientific classification
- Kingdom: Plantae
- Clade: Tracheophytes
- Clade: Angiosperms
- Clade: Monocots
- Clade: Commelinids
- Order: Zingiberales
- Family: Zingiberaceae
- Genus: Boesenbergia
- Species: B. magna

Binomial name
- Boesenbergia magna (R.M.Sm.) Veldkamp & Mood (2020)

Synonyms
- Haplochorema magnum R.M.Sm. (1987)

Species of flowering plant

Boesenbergia magna is a species of flowering plant in the ginger family, Zingiberaceae. It is a rhizomatous geophyte endemic to the Malaysian state of Sarawak on the island of Borneo.

It was first formally named Haplochorema magnum in 1987 by Rosemary Margaret Smith. In 2020 it was renamed Boesenbergia magna when genus Haplochorema was subsumed into Boesenbergia.
