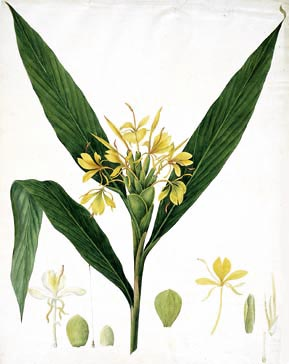
- Hedychium coccineum as illustrated by William Roscoe

Scientific classification
- Kingdom: Plantae
- Clade: Tracheophytes
- Clade: Angiosperms
- Clade: Monocots
- Clade: Commelinids
- Order: Zingiberales
- Family: Zingiberaceae
- Genus: Hedychium
- Species: H. coccineum

Binomial name
- Hedychium coccineum Buch.-Ham. ex Sm.

Synonyms
- Hedychium angustifolium Roxb. ex Ker-Gawl.; Hedychium carneum G.Lodd.; Hedychium longifolium Roscoe; Hedychium aurantiacum Roscoe; Hedychium roscoei Wall. ex Roscoe; Hedychium squarrosum Buch.-Ham. ex Wall.; Gandasulium angustifolium Kuntze; Gandasulium coccineum (Buch.-Ham. ex Sm.) Kuntze; Hedychium coccineum var. angustifolium Baker; Hedychium coccineum var. carneum (G.Lodd.) Baker; Hedychium coccineum var. longifolium (Roscoe) Baker; Hedychium coccineum var. roscoei Wall. ex Baker; Hedychium coccineum var. squarrosum (Buch.-Ham. ex Wall.) Baker

= Hedychium coccineum =

Species of flowering plant

Hedychium coccineum is a species of flowering plant in the ginger family Zingiberaceae. It is native to southern China (Guangxi, Tibet, Yunnan), the Himalayas, India and Indochina. Common names include orange gingerlily, scarlet gingerlily and orange bottlebrush ginger.

This erect herbaceous perennial grows on the edge of forests and in mountain grasslands. It prefers partial sunshine, but can tolerate full sun. The flowers can range in colour from red to orange to almost yellow.

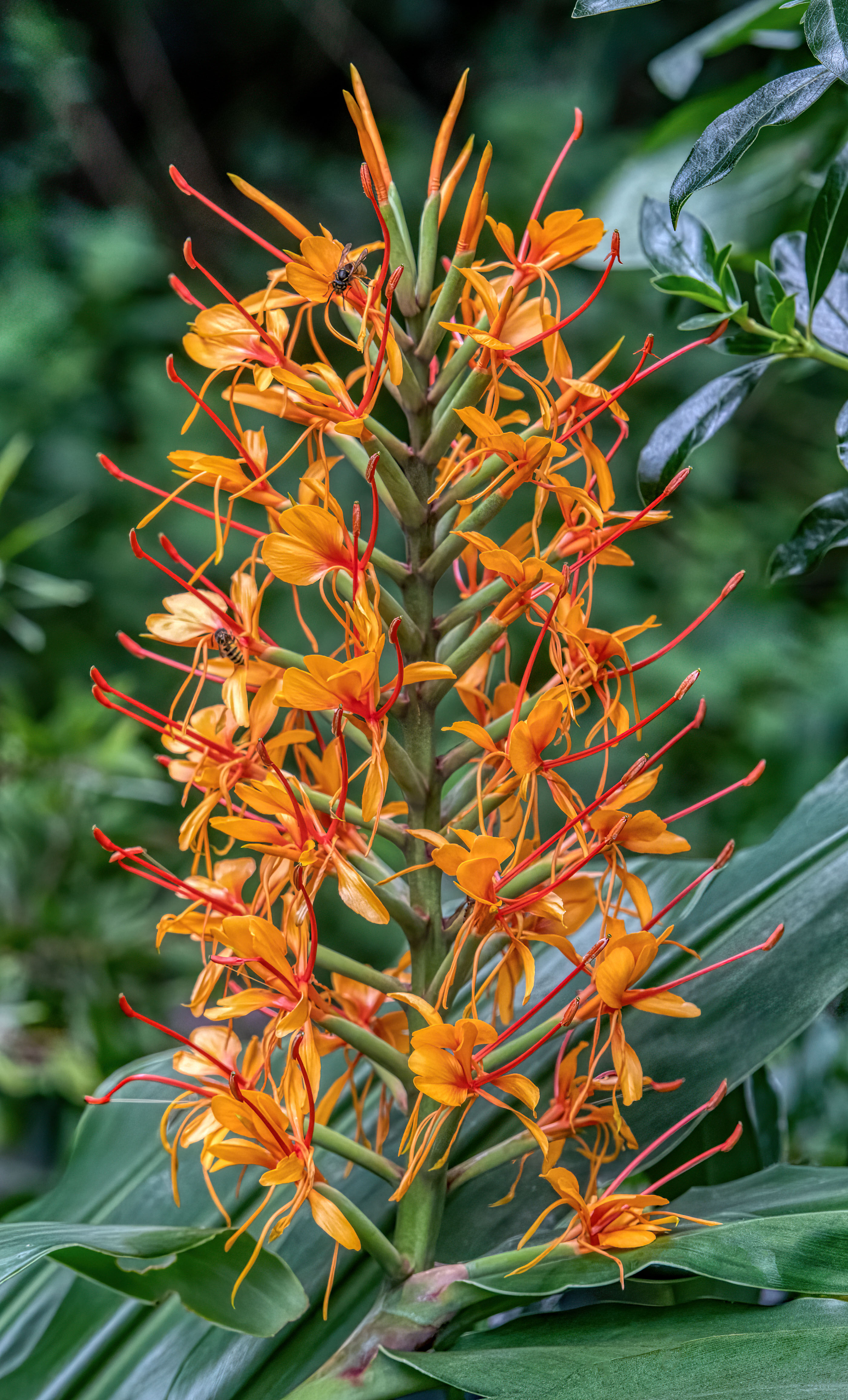
Hedychium coccineum Ginger Lily cultivar
