= Boesenbergia maxwellii =

Scientific classification
- Kingdom: Plantae
- Clade: Tracheophytes
- Clade: Angiosperms
- Clade: Monocots
- Clade: Commelinids
- Order: Zingiberales
- Family: Zingiberaceae
- Genus: Boesenbergia
- Species: B. maxwellii

Binomial name
- Boesenbergia maxwellii Mood, Prince & Triboun, 2013

Species of flowering plant

Boesenbergia maxwellii is a plant species in the family Zingiberaceae and tribe Zingibereae; its native range is in Indo-China from Myanmar to Laos.

== Description ==
B. maxwellii is a herb, growing up to 1.5 m (4 ft 11 in) tall. The rhizome is small and approximately spherical, 10–20 mm (0.39–0.79 in) in diameter, with numerous cylindrical tuberous roots. Its leaves are simple and alternate: dimension 300-500 x 150-250 mm. Its flower spikes arise directly from the rhizome; individual flowers are horn-shaped, up to 150 mm (5.9 in) long. The flowers are white with a light labellum and dark pink- purple, sometimes with an orange base. Flowering (in Thailand) is in June–August.
