= Hedychium griersonianum =

Scientific classification
- Kingdom: Plantae
- Clade: Tracheophytes
- Clade: Angiosperms
- Clade: Monocots
- Clade: Commelinids
- Order: Zingiberales
- Family: Zingiberaceae
- Genus: Hedychium
- Species: H. griersonianum

Binomial name
- Hedychium griersonianum R.M.Sm.

Species of flowering plant

Hedychium griersonianum is a monocotyledonous plant species described by Rosemary Margaret Smith. Hedychium griersonianum is part of the genus Hedychium and the family Zingiberaceae. No subspecies are listed in the Catalog of Life.
