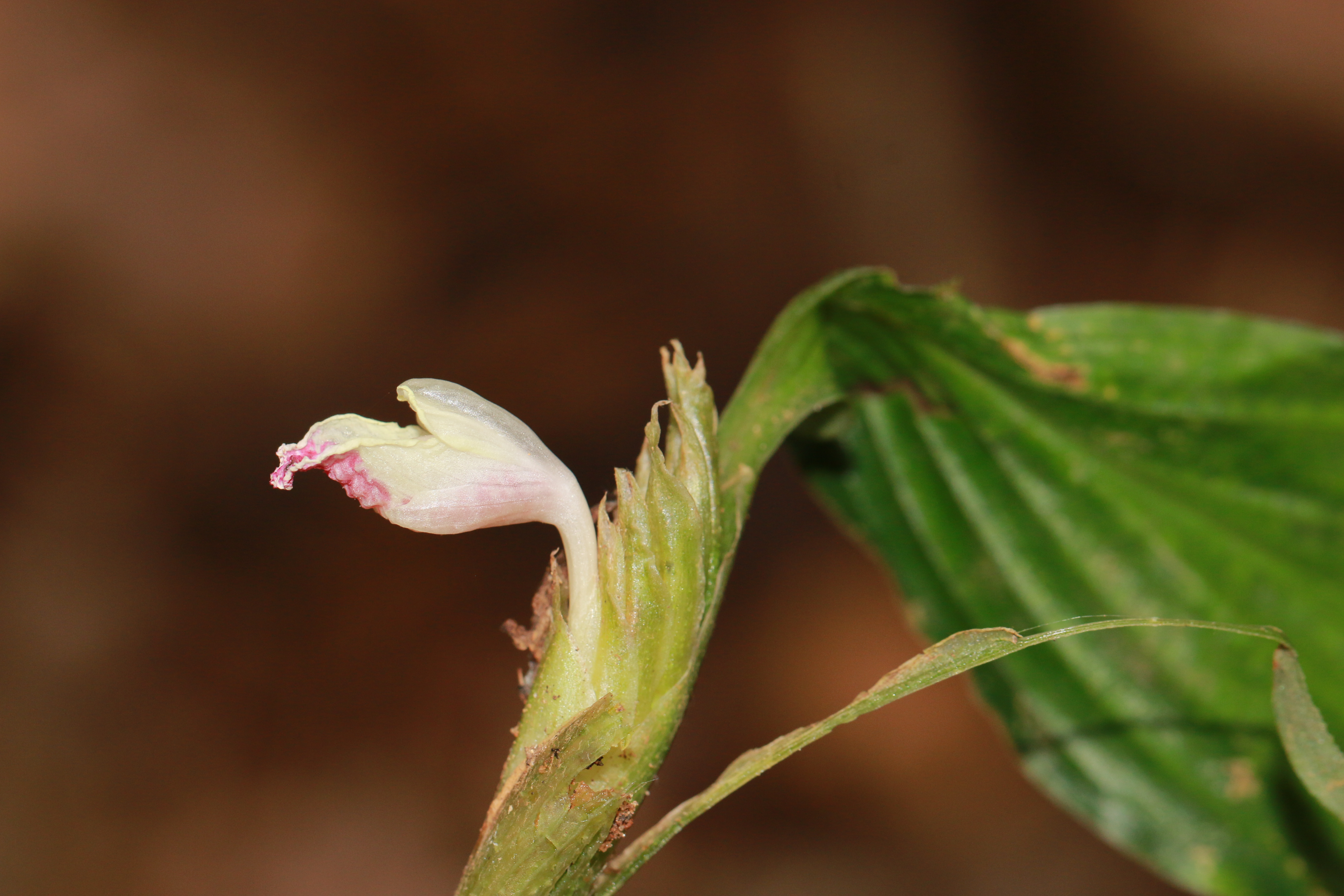

Scientific classification
- Kingdom: Plantae
- Clade: Tracheophytes
- Clade: Angiosperms
- Clade: Monocots
- Clade: Commelinids
- Order: Zingiberales
- Family: Zingiberaceae
- Genus: Boesenbergia
- Species: B. pulcherrima

Binomial name
- Boesenbergia pulcherrima (Wall.) Kuntze

Synonyms
- Gastrochilus pulcherrimus Wall.

= Boesenbergia pulcherrima =

Species of flowering plant

Boesenbergia pulcherrima is a species of flowering plant in the ginger family, Zingiberaceae. It is a rhizomatous geophyte that grows in the wet tropical biome.
