= Boesenbergia siphonantha =

Scientific classification
- Kingdom: Plantae
- Clade: Tracheophytes
- Clade: Angiosperms
- Clade: Monocots
- Clade: Commelinids
- Order: Zingiberales
- Family: Zingiberaceae
- Genus: Boesenbergia
- Species: B. siphonantha

Binomial name
- Boesenbergia siphonantha (King ex Baker) M.Sabu, Prasanthk. & Škorničk.

Synonyms
- Kaempferia siphonantha King ex Baker

Species of flowering plant

Boesenbergia siphonantha is a species of flowering plant in the ginger family Zingiberaceae and tribe Zingibereae. Records of occurrence are from the Andaman Islands, Thailand and Vietnam.
