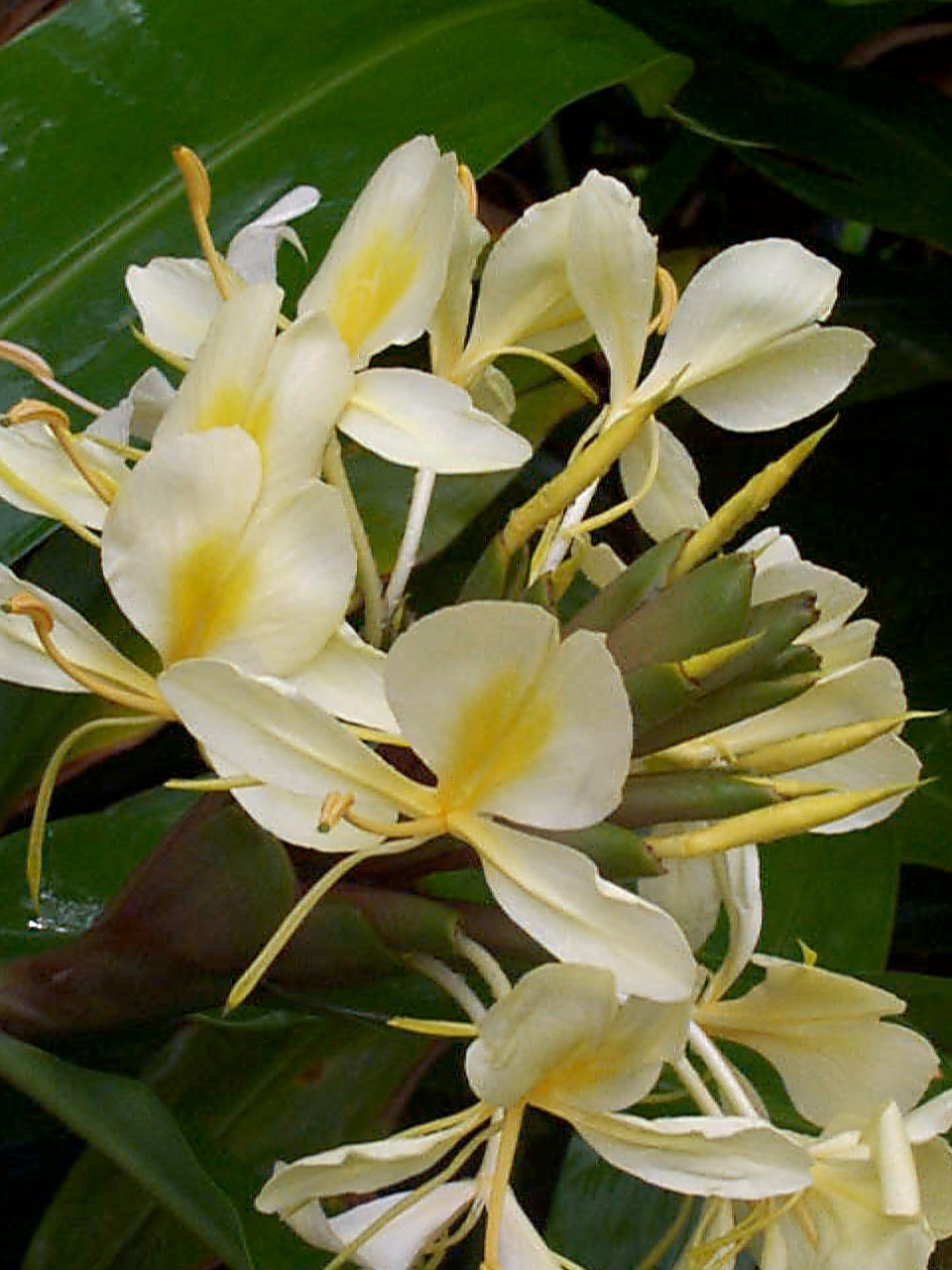

Scientific classification
- Kingdom: Plantae
- Clade: Tracheophytes
- Clade: Angiosperms
- Clade: Monocots
- Clade: Commelinids
- Order: Zingiberales
- Family: Zingiberaceae
- Genus: Hedychium
- Species: H. flavescens

Binomial name
- Hedychium flavescens Carey ex Roscoe

Synonyms
- Hedychium coronarium var. flavescens (Carey ex Roscoe) Baker in J.D.Hooker; Hedychium subditum Turrill; Hedychium coronarium var. subditum (Turrill) Naik; Hedychium emeiense Z.Y.Zhu; Hedychium panzhuum Z.Y.Zhu

= Hedychium flavescens =

Yellow ginger

Species of flowering plant

Hedychium flavescens is a perennial flowering plant from the Zingiberaceae (the ginger family). It is native to the Himalayas, Sichuan, and northern Vietnam, and naturalized in various other lands (South Africa, Madagascar, Mauritius, India, Sri Lanka, French Polynesia, Hawaii, etc.).

Commonly known as cream garland-lily or yellow ginger, it grows up to 2.5 metres (8 ft 2 in) high. It is extremely shade-tolerant, and thrives in a wide range of soils. Since it has the ability to regrow from even a small fragment of the rhizome, which survive crushing, immersion in sea water, and even years outside of soil, elimination can be a problem. It is treated as an invasive weed in New Zealand because of its ability to displace other species.

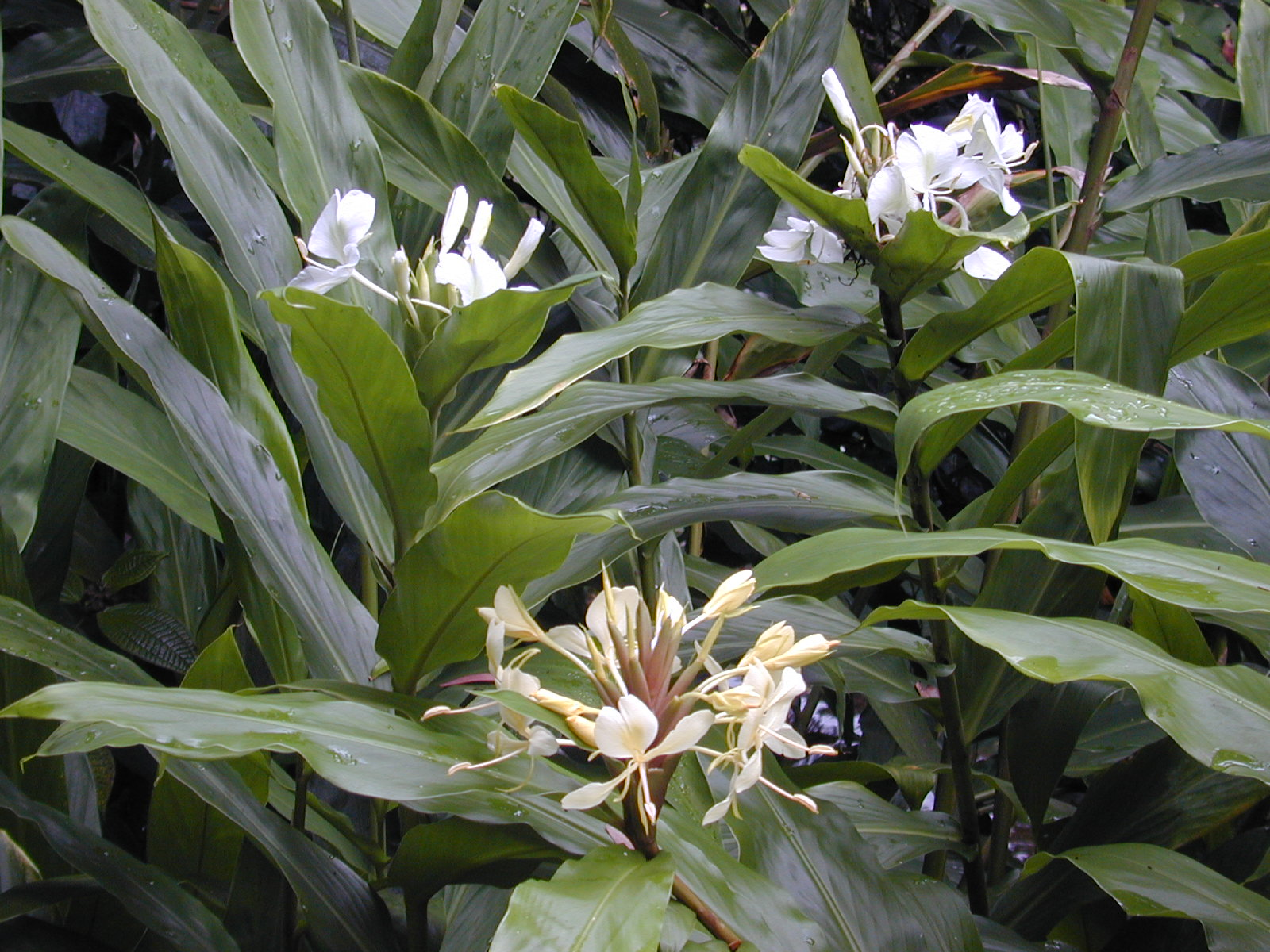
Hedychium flavescens, pale yellow, growing among Hedychium coronarium.
