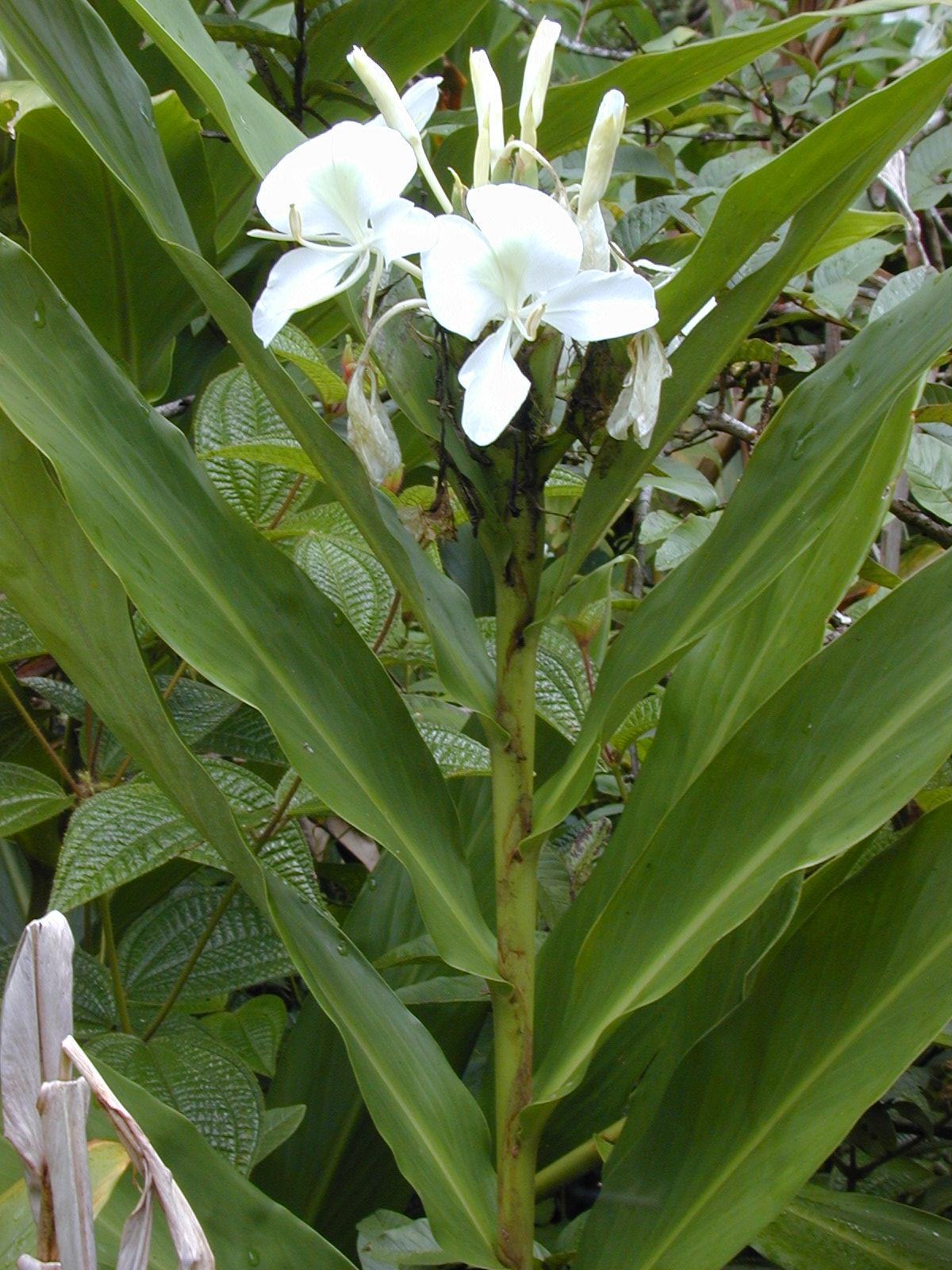
- Hedychium coronarium

Scientific classification
- Kingdom: Plantae
- Clade: Tracheophytes
- Clade: Angiosperms
- Clade: Monocots
- Clade: Commelinids
- Order: Zingiberales
- Family: Zingiberaceae
- Subfamily: Zingiberoideae
- Tribe: Zingibereae
- Genus: Hedychium; J.Koenig

Synonyms
- Gamochilus T.Lestib.; Gandasulium Rumph. ex Kuntze; Brachychilum (R.Br. ex Wall.) Petersen

= Hedychium =

Genus of flowering plants

Hedychium [ha-DEE-kee-um] is a genus of flowering plants in the ginger family Zingiberaceae, native to lightly wooded habitats in Asia. There are approximately 70-80 known species, native to India, Southeast Asia, and Madagascar. Some species have become widely naturalized in other lands, and considered invasive in some places.

The genus name Hedychium is derived from two ancient Greek words, hedys meaning "sweet" and chios meaning "snow". This refers to the fragrant white flower of the type species H. coronarium. Common names include garland flower, ginger lily, and kahili ginger.

Members of the genus Hedychium are rhizomatous perennials, commonly growing 120–180 cm (47–71 in) tall. Some species are cultivated for their exotic foliage and fragrant spikes of flowers in shades of white, yellow and orange. Numerous cultivars have been developed for garden use, of which Hedychium x moorei 'Tara' has gained the Royal Horticultural Society's Award of Garden Merit. Though reasonably hardy down to −10 °C (14 °F), it requires a sheltered position and a deep mulch in winter.

== Species ==
- Hedychium aureum
- Hedychium biflorum
- Hedychium bijiangense
- Hedychium bipartitum
- Hedychium boloveniorum
- Hedychium bordelonianum
- Hedychium borneense
- Hedychium bousigonianum
- Hedychium brevicaule
- Hedychium calcaratum
- Hedychium champasakense
- Hedychium chayanianum
- Hedychium chingmeianum
- Hedychium coccineum
- Hedychium collinum
- Hedychium convexum
- Hedychium coronarium
- Hedychium cylindricum
- Hedychium deceptum
- Hedychium densiflorum
- Hedychium dichotomatum
- Hedychium efilamentosum
- Hedychium elatum
- Hedychium ellipticum
- Hedychium elwesii
- Hedychium erythrostemon
- Hedychium flavescens
- Hedychium flavum
- Hedychium forrestii
- Hedychium gardnerianum
- Hedychium glabrum
- Hedychium glaucum
- Hedychium gomezianum
- Hedychium gracile
- Hedychium gracillimum
- Hedychium gratum
- Hedychium greenii
- Hedychium griersonianum
- Hedychium griffithianum
- Hedychium hasseltii
- Hedychium hirsutissimum
- Hedychium hookeri
- Hedychium horsfieldii
- Hedychium intermedium
- Hedychium khaomaenense
- Hedychium kwangsiense
- Hedychium larsenii
- Hedychium lineare
- Hedychium longicornutum
- Hedychium longipedunculatum
- Hedychium longipetalum
- Hedychium luteum
- Hedychium macrorrhizum
- Hedychium malayanum
- Hedychium marginatum
- Hedychium matthewii
- Hedychium menghaiense
- Hedychium menglianense
- Hedychium muanwongyathiae
- Hedychium muluense
- Hedychium nagamiense
- Hedychium neocarneum
- Hedychium nutantiflorum
- Hedychium paludosum
- Hedychium parvibracteatum
- Hedychium pauciflorum
- Hedychium peregrinum
- Hedychium philippinense
- Hedychium phuluangense
- Hedychium poilanei
- Hedychium puerense
- Hedychium putaoense
- Hedychium pynursulaeanum
- Hedychium qingchengense
- Hedychium radiatum
- Hedychium raoi
- Hedychium robustum
- Hedychium roxburghii
- Hedychium samuiense
- Hedychium satyanarayanum
- Hedychium siamense
- Hedychium simaoense
- Hedychium sirirugsae
- Hedychium speciosum
- Hedychium spicatum
- Hedychium stenopetalum
- Hedychium tenellum
- Hedychium tengchongense
- Hedychium thaianum
- Hedychium thyrsiforme
- Hedychium tienlinense
- Hedychium tomentosum
- Hedychium venustum
- Hedychium villosum
- Hedychium viridibracteatum
- Hedychium wardii
- Hedychium ximengense
- Hedychium yungjiangense
- Hedychium yunnanense
- Hedychium zubeengargianum

== Taxonomy and phylogeny ==
In 2000, Tom Wood et al. published the first phylogeny of the genus Hedychium represented by 29 taxa.

== Reproductive biology ==
Hedychium has multiple modes of reproduction: sexual reproduction via flowers, and asexual reproduction via rhizomes and via bulbils (only reported in Hedychium greenii). Some species of Hedychium are reported to exhibit facultative vivipary, where in the seedlings are observed to grow from the dried infructescence.

== See also ==
- List of plants known as lily
