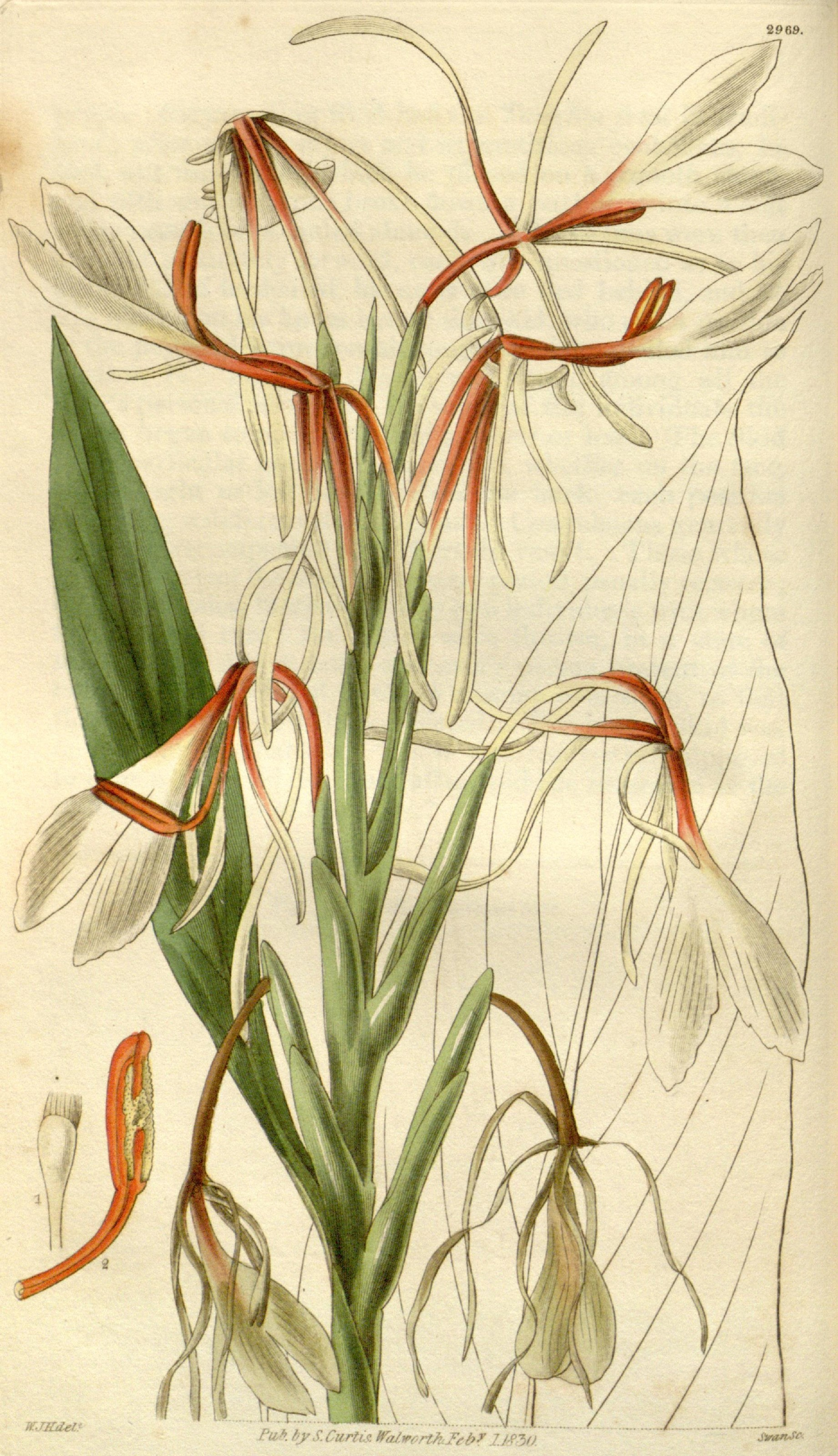

Conservation status
- Least Concern (IUCN 3.1)

Scientific classification
- Kingdom: Plantae
- Clade: Tracheophytes
- Clade: Angiosperms
- Clade: Monocots
- Clade: Commelinids
- Order: Zingiberales
- Family: Zingiberaceae
- Genus: Hedychium
- Species: H. spicatum

Binomial name
- Hedychium spicatum Sm.

Synonyms
- Hedychium acuminatum Roscoe; Hedychium trilobum Wall. ex Roscoe; Hedychium flavescens Lodd. ex Lindl.; Hedychium album Buch.-Ham. ex Wall.; Hedychium sieboldii Wall.; Hedychium spicatum var. acuminatum (Roscoe) Wall.; Hedychium spicatum var. trilobum (Wall. ex Roscoe) Wall.; Hedychium tavoyanum Horan.; Gandasulium sieboldii (Wall.) Kuntze; Gandasulium spicatum (Sm.) Kuntze; Hedychium spicatum var. khasianum C.B.Clarke ex Baker

= Hedychium spicatum =

Spiked ginger lily

Species of flowering plant

Hedychium spicatum is a plant species native to China (Guizhou, Sichuan, Tibet, Yunnan), the Himalayas, Myanmar, and Thailand.

Hedychium spicatum is a small, hardy perennial that grows to around 1 m (3 ft 3 in), with green leaves and large orange and white flowers. It is also commonly known as spiked ginger lily, or perfume ginger.

== Uses ==
The Indian medicinal system (Ayurveda) described the species as having pungent, light, bitter, strong, heating properties. The species is also an ingredient of some traditional Chinese medicine, traditional Tibetan medicine and Unani medicine. The powder and decoction of the rhizome are used for a variety of conditions. The rhizome is also chewed by the inhabitants of Uttarakhand to clean their mouths and freshen their breath.

The fruit of this species may be cooked and eaten with lentils in savoury dishes. Crushed rhizomes, both fresh and dried, are very aromatic with a fragrant, somewhat pungent smell similar to orris root but more powerful. In Manipur, the rhizome is cooked to prepare chutney.

"Abir", a fragrant coloured powder marketed for religious ceremonies, is prepared from its dried rhizomes. In Himachal Pradesh, leaves are used in making mats for the home, combined with wheat straw, enhancing the durability of the product. The aromatic dried root of this plant is often used as an incense in Ethiopia. The essential oil has a fragrance somewhat like hyacinths with a long-lasting scent.
