= Boesenbergia =

- Boesenbergia pulcherrima

Scientific classification
- Kingdom: Plantae
- Clade: Tracheophytes
- Clade: Angiosperms
- Clade: Monocots
- Clade: Commelinids
- Order: Zingiberales
- Family: Zingiberaceae
- Subfamily: Zingiberoideae
- Tribe: Zingibereae
- Genus: Boesenbergia; Kuntze (1891)

Type species
- Boesenbergia pulcherrima (Wall.) Kuntze

Synonyms
- Banglium Buch.-Ham. ex Wall. (1832), without description; Curcumorpha A.S.Rao & D.M.Verma (1971 publ. 1974); Gastrochilus Wall. (1829), illegitimate homonym, not D.Don (1825); Haplochorema K.Schum. (1899); Jirawongsea Picheans. (2008)

Genus of flowering plants

Boesenbergia is a genus of plants in the ginger family. It contains more than 100 species, native to China, the Indian subcontinent, and Southeast Asia (Thailand, Malaysia, Philippines, Indonesia, etc.).

== Species ==
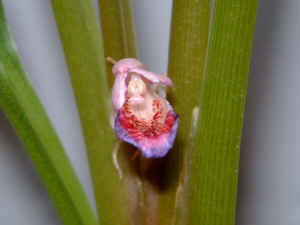
Boesenbergia rotunda

Boesenbergia tiliifolia

As of September 2026, Plants of the World Online includes:

1. Boesenbergia alba (K.Larsen & R.M.Sm.) Mood & L.M.Prince - Thailand
2. Boesenbergia albolutea (Baker) Schltr. - Andaman Islands
3. Boesenbergia albomaculata S.Q.Tong - Yunnan
4. Boesenbergia albosanguinea (Ridl.) Loes. - Thailand, Peninsular Malaysia
5. Boesenbergia angustifolia (Hallier f.) Schltr. - Thailand, Sumatra
6. Boesenbergia apiculata (Valeton) Loes. in H.G.A.Engler - Kalimantan
7. Boesenbergia armeniaca Cowley - Brunei, Sabah
8. Boesenbergia ashihoi S.Debnath, Sameer Patil & D.Vijayan - Assam
9. Boesenbergia atropurpurea Mas Izzaty & Meekiong - Borneo
10. Boesenbergia aurantiaca R.M.Sm. - Borneo
11. Boesenbergia baimaii Saensouk & K.Larsen - Thailand
12. Boesenbergia basispicata K.Larsen ex Sirirugsa - Thailand
13. Boesenbergia belalongensis A.D.Poulsen - Brunei
14. Boesenbergia bella Mood & L.M.Prince - Laos
15. Boesenbergia bosuangii N.F.Lam - Borneo
16. Boesenbergia bruneiana Cowley - Brunei
17. Boesenbergia burmanica Boonma, P.Saensouk & Saensouk - Myanmar (Burma)
18. Boesenbergia burttiana R.M.Sm. - Sarawak - Borneo
19. Boesenbergia burttii (K.Larsen & Jenjitt.) Mood & L.M.Prince - Laos
20. Boesenbergia clivalis (Ridl.) Schltr. - Peninsular Malaysia
21. Boesenbergia collinsii Mood & L.M.Prince - Thailand
22. Boesenbergia cordata R.M.Sm. - Sarawak
23. Boesenbergia curtisii (Baker) Schltr. - Peninsular Malaysia, Thailand
24. Boesenbergia decus-silvae (Hallier f.) Ardiyani & Mood - Borneo
25. Boesenbergia eburnea Docot - Philippines
26. Boesenbergia extensa (K.Schum.) Veldkamp & Mood - Borneo
27. Boesenbergia flabellata S.Sakai & Nagam. - Sarawak
28. Boesenbergia flava Holttum - Peninsular Malaysia
29. Boesenbergia flavoalba R.M.Sm. - Borneo
30. Boesenbergia flavorubra R.M.Sm. - Sabah, Sarawak
31. Boesenbergia ganaensis N.F.Lam - Borneo
32. Boesenbergia gokusingii N.F.Lam - Borneo
33. Boesenbergia grandifolia (Valeton) Merr. - Borneo
34. Boesenbergia grandis R.M.Sm. - Sabah, Sarawak
35. Boesenbergia hamiltonii Mood, S.Dey & L.M.Prince -Sikkim to N. Bangladesh
36. Boesenbergia hirta (Ridl.) Merr. - Sarawak
37. Boesenbergia hosensis Cowley - Sarawak
38. Boesenbergia hutchinsonii B.L.Burtt & R.M.Sm. - Sarawak
39. Boesenbergia igorota Tad-o & Napaldet - Philippines
40. Boesenbergia imbakensis S.Sakai & Nagam. - Borneo
41. Boesenbergia ischnosiphon S.Sakai & Nagam. - Sarawak
42. Boesenbergia islamii Yusof & M.A.Rahman - Bangladesh
43. Boesenbergia jangarunii Cowley - Brunei
44. Boesenbergia kenali C.K.Lim - Peninsular Malaysia
45. Boesenbergia kerbyi R.M.Sm. - Sarawak
46. Boesenbergia kerrii Mood, L.M.Prince & Triboun - western Indochina
47. Boesenbergia kingii Mood & L.M.Prince - India, southern China, western Indochina
48. Boesenbergia laevivaginata S.Sakai & Nagam. - Sabah, Sarawak
49. Boesenbergia lambirensis S.Sakai & Nagam. - Sarawak
50. Boesenbergia laotica (Picheans. & Mokkamul) Mood & L.M.Prince
51. Boesenbergia latilabra (Valeton) Veldkamp & Mood
52. Boesenbergia latongensis Meekiong, Ipor & Ibrahim
53. Boesenbergia leonardocoi Funak. & Docot - Philippines
54. Boesenbergia loerzingii (Valeton) K.Larsen ex M.F.Newman, Lhuillier & A.D.Poulsen - Sumatra
55. Boesenbergia longiflora (Wall.) Kuntze - Myanmar
56. Boesenbergia longipes (King & Prain ex Ridl.) Schltr. - Perak, Thailand
57. Boesenbergia longipetiolata (Ridl.) Merr. - Mindanao
58. Boesenbergia lysichitoides S.Sakai & Nagam. - Sarawak
59. Boesenbergia macropoda Merr. - Jolo
60. Boesenbergia magna (R.M.Sm.) Veldkamp & Mood - Borneo
61. Boesenbergia maxwellii Mood, L.M.Prince & Triboun - Myanmar, Thailand
62. Boesenbergia meghalayensis Aishwarya & M.Sabu
63. Boesenbergia minor (Baker) Kuntze - Peninsular Malaysia
64. Boesenbergia monophylla N.S.Lý, N.G.Cao & Škorničk. - Vietnam
65. Boesenbergia moodii Nob.Tanaka & Paing - Myanmar
66. Boesenbergia ochroleuca (Ridl.) Schltr. - Thailand
67. Boesenbergia oligosperma (K.Schum.) R.M.Sm. - Sarawak
68. Boesenbergia orbiculata R.M.Sm. - Brunei, Sarawak
69. Boesenbergia ornata (N.E.Br.) R.M.Sm. - Kalimantan
70. Boesenbergia parva (Ridl.) Merr. - Sarawak
71. Boesenbergia parvula (Wall. ex Baker) Kuntze - Myanmar, Thailand
72. Boesenbergia pauciflora (R.M.Sm.) Veldkamp & Mood
73. Boesenbergia petiolata Sirirugsa - Thailand
74. Boesenbergia phengklaii Mood
75. Boesenbergia plicata (Ridl.) Holttum - Myanmar, Thailand, Peninsular Malaysia
76. Boesenbergia prainiana (King ex Baker) Schltr. - Thailand, Peninsular Malaysia
77. Boesenbergia pulchella (Ridl.) Merr. - Sabah, Sarawak
78. Boesenbergia pulcherrima (Wall.) Kuntze - India, Thailand, Myanmar, Peninsular Malaysia – type species
79. Boesenbergia purpureorubra Mood & L.M.Prince
80. Boesenbergia putiana Mood & L.M.Prince
81. Boesenbergia quangngaiensis N.S.Lý
82. Boesenbergia regalis Kharuk. & Tohdam - Thailand
83. Boesenbergia roseopunctata (Ridl.) I.M.Turner - Sumatra
84. Boesenbergia rotunda (L.) Mansf. - Yunnan, Indochina, Java, Malaysia, Sumatra, Andaman Islands; introduced into India and Sri Lanka
85. Boesenbergia rubrolutea (Baker) Kuntze - Assam
86. Boesenbergia siamensis (Gagnep.) Sirirugsa - Thailand
87. Boesenbergia siphonantha (King ex Baker) M.Sabu, Prasanthk. & Škornick. - Indochina
88. Boesenbergia stenophylla R.M.Sm. - Borneo
89. Boesenbergia striata (Valeton) Loes. in H.G.A.Engler - Kalimantan
90. Boesenbergia subulata S.Sakai & Nagam - Borneo
91. Boesenbergia sugudensis N.F.Lam - Borneo
92. Boesenbergia tenuispicata K.Larsen - Thailand
93. Boesenbergia thailandica (K.Larsen) Mood & L.M.Prince
94. Boesenbergia thorelii (Gagnep.) Loes. in H.G.A.Engler - Indochina
95. Boesenbergia tiliifolia (Baker) Kuntze - India, Assam
96. Boesenbergia tillandsiodes (Baker) Kuntze - India, Assam, Peninsular Malaysia
97. Boesenbergia trangensis K.Larsen - Thailand
98. Boesenbergia uniflora (K.Schum.) Ardiyani & Mood
99. Boesenbergia urceoligena A.D.Poulsen - Brunei
100. Boesenbergia variegata R.M.Sm. - Sabah, Sarawak
101. Boesenbergia vittata (N.E.Br.) Loes. in H.G.A.Engler - Sumatra
102. Boesenbergia xiphostachya (Gagnep.) Loes. in H.G.A.Engler - Indochina

Note: Boesenbergia fallax Loes. in H.G.A.Engler is a synonym of Zingiber fallax (Loes.) L.Bai, Juan Chen & N.H.Xia
