= List of Garcinia species =

Garcinia is a large genus of flowering plants in the family Clusiaceae. As of January 2026, there are 416 species accepted by Plants of the World Online:

== A-B ==
- Garcinia acuminata Planch. & Triana
- Garcinia acuticosta Nazre
- Garcinia acutifolia N.Robson
- Garcinia adinantha A.C.Sm. & S.P.Darwin
- Garcinia afzelii Engl.
- Garcinia agnoume P.W.Sweeney
- Garcinia albuquerquei (M.E.Berg) Bittrich
- Garcinia alepensis P.W.Sweeney
- Garcinia amabilis Kaneh. & Hatus.
- Garcinia amboinensis Spreng.
- Garcinia ambrensis (H.Perrier) P.W.Sweeney & Z.S.Rogers
- Garcinia amplexicaulis Vieill. ex Pierre
- Garcinia angustifolia A.C.Sm.
- Garcinia anjouanensis (H.Perrier) P.W.Sweeney & Z.S.Rogers
- Garcinia anomala Planch. & Triana
- Garcinia apetala Pierre
- Garcinia aphanophlebia Baker
- Garcinia apostoloi Mouzinho
- Garcinia archboldiana A.C.Sm.
- Garcinia arenicola (Jum. & H.Perrier) P.W.Sweeney & Z.S.Rogers
- Garcinia aristata (Griseb.) Borhidi
- Garcinia assamica J.Sarma, Shameer & N.Mohanan
- Garcinia assugu Lauterb.
- Garcinia asterandra Jum. & H.Perrier
- Garcinia atroviridis Griff. ex T.Anderson
- Garcinia australis Montrouz.
- Garcinia bakeriana (Urb.) Borhidi
- Garcinia balansae Pierre
- Garcinia balica Miq.
- Garcinia balimensis A.C.Sm.
- Garcinia bancana Miq.
- Garcinia barkeriana (Urb. & Ekman) Alain
- Garcinia beccarii Pierre
- Garcinia benthamiana (Planch. & Triana) Pipoly
- Garcinia bicolorata Elmer
- Garcinia bifasciculata N.Robson
- Garcinia binnendijkii Pierre
- Garcinia binucao (Blanco) Choisy
- Garcinia blumei Pierre
- Garcinia boerlagii Pierre
- Garcinia bonii Pit.
- Garcinia borneensis Pierre
- Garcinia branderhorstii Lauterb.
- Garcinia brasiliensis Mart.
- Garcinia brassii C.T.White
- Garcinia brevipes Pierre
- Garcinia brevirostris Scheff.
- Garcinia buchananii Baker
- Garcinia buchneri Engl.
- Garcinia burkillii Whitmore
- Garcinia busuangaensis Merr.

== C-D ==
- Garcinia cadelliana King
- Garcinia calcicola (Jum. & H.Perrier) P.W.Sweeney & Z.S.Rogers
- Garcinia caloneura Boerl.
- Garcinia calophylla Pierre
- Garcinia calophyllifolia Ridl.
- Garcinia calycina Kurz
- Garcinia cambogioides (Murray) Headland
- Garcinia cantleyana Whitmore
- Garcinia capuronii Z.S.Rogers & P.W.Sweeney
- Garcinia carolinensis (Lauterb.) Kosterm.
- Garcinia caudiculata Ridl.
- Garcinia celebica L.
- Garcinia ceramica Boerl.
- Garcinia cerasifera (H.Perrier) P.F.Stevens
- Garcinia chapelieri (Planch. & Triana) H.Perrier
- Garcinia choisyiana (Choisy) Wall. ex Planch. & Triana
- Garcinia chromocarpa Engl.
- Garcinia cincta (Urb.) Borhidi
- Garcinia clarensis Borhidi
- Garcinia clusiifolia Ridl.
- Garcinia cochinchinensis (Lour.) Choisy
- Garcinia comptonii Baker f.
- Garcinia conicarpa Wight
- Garcinia corallina Vieill.
- Garcinia cordata Merr.
- Garcinia corymbosa (Pancher & Sebert) Baker f.
- Garcinia costata Hemsl. ex King
- Garcinia cowa Roxb. ex Choisy
- Garcinia crassiflora Jum. & H.Perrier
- Garcinia crassifolia Seeth.
- Garcinia crassinervis (Warb.) Kosterm.
- Garcinia cubensis (Borhidi) Borhidi
- Garcinia cuneifolia Pierre
- Garcinia cuspidata King
- Garcinia cymosa (K.Schum.) I.M.Turner & P.F.Stevens
- Garcinia daedalanthera Pierre
- Garcinia dalleizettei (H.Perrier) P.W.Sweeney & Z.S.Rogers
- Garcinia dallmannensis Kaneh. & Hatus.
- Garcinia dauphinensis P.W.Sweeney & Z.S.Rogers
- Garcinia decaryana (H.Perrier) ined.
- Garcinia decipiens (Baill.) Vesque
- Garcinia decussata C.D.Adams
- Garcinia delpyana Pierre
- Garcinia densiflora Pierre
- Garcinia densivenia Engl.
- Garcinia desrousseauxii Pierre
- Garcinia dhanikhariensis S.K.Srivast.
- Garcinia dioica Blume
- Garcinia diospyrifolia Pierre
- Garcinia discoidea Nazre
- Garcinia diversifolia King
- Garcinia dives Pierre
- Garcinia dryobalanoides Pierre
- Garcinia dulcis (Roxb.) Kurz
- Garcinia dumosa King

== E-H ==
- Garcinia echinocarpa Thwaites
- Garcinia elliotii Engl.
- Garcinia emarginata Lauterb.
- Garcinia engleriana A.C.Sm.
- Garcinia enthaematoeides Lauterb.
- Garcinia epunctata Stapf
- Garcinia erythrosepala Y.H.Li
- Garcinia erythrosperma Lauterb.
- Garcinia esculenta Y.H.Li
- Garcinia evonymoides (Planch. & Triana) P.W.Sweeney & Z.S.Rogers
- Garcinia exigua Nazre
- Garcinia fagraeoides A.Chev.
- Garcinia floribunda Miq.
- Garcinia fluviatilis Mouzinho & L.Marinho
- Garcinia forbesii King
- Garcinia fruticosa Lauterb.
- Garcinia fusca Pierre
- Garcinia fuscopetiolata Lauterb.
- Garcinia gabonensis Sosef & Dauby
- Garcinia gamblei Shameer, T.Sabu & N.Mohanan
- Garcinia garciae Elmer
- Garcinia gardneriana (Planch. & Triana) Zappi
- Garcinia gaudichaudii Planch. & Triana
- Garcinia gerrardii Harv. ex Sim
- Garcinia gibbsiae S.Moore
- Garcinia gjellerupii Lauterb.
- Garcinia glaucescens Alain & M.M.Mejia
- Garcinia goudotiana (Planch. & Triana) P.W.Sweeney & Z.S.Rogers
- Garcinia grahamii Pierre
- Garcinia graminea Kosterm.
- Garcinia grandifolia (Choisy) Pierre
- Garcinia griffithii T.Anderson
- Garcinia guacopary (S.Moore) M.Nee
- Garcinia gummi-gutta (L.) N.Robson
- Garcinia hanburyi Hook.f.
- Garcinia harmandii Pierre
- Garcinia hasskarlii Pierre
- Garcinia havilandii Stapf
- Garcinia hendersoniana Whitmore
- Garcinia hennecartii Pierre ex Schltr.
- Garcinia hermonii Kosterm.
- Garcinia hessii (Britton) Alain
- Garcinia heterandra Wall. ex Planch. & Triana
- Garcinia hollrungii Lauterb.
- Garcinia holttumii Ridl.
- Garcinia hopii H.Toyama & V.S.Dang
- Garcinia horsfieldiana Pierre
- Garcinia huillensis Welw. ex Oliv.
- Garcinia humilis (Vahl) C.D.Adams
- Garcinia hunsteinii Lauterb.
- Garcinia hygrophila Lauterb.

== I-L ==
- Garcinia idenburgensis A.C.Sm.
- Garcinia imbertii Bourd.
- Garcinia indica (Thouars) Choisy
- Garcinia intermedia (Pittier) Hammel
- Garcinia ituman Merr.
- Garcinia jaweri Lauterb.
- Garcinia jelinekii Kurz
- Garcinia jensenii W.E.Cooper
- Garcinia keenania Pierre
- Garcinia kimbiliensis (Spirlet) P.W.Sweeney
- Garcinia kingaensis Engl.
- Garcinia kisonghi (Vermoesen) P.W.Sweeney
- Garcinia klabang Miq.
- Garcinia klinkii Lauterb.
- Garcinia klossii Ridl.
- Garcinia kola Heckel
- Garcinia korthalsii Pierre
- Garcinia kurzii Pierre
- Garcinia kwangsiensis Merr. ex F.N.Wei
- Garcinia lanceifolia Roxb.
- Garcinia lanceola Ridl.
- Garcinia lancilimba C.Y.Wu ex Y.H.Li
- Garcinia lanessanii Pierre
- Garcinia lateriflora Blume
- Garcinia latissima Miq.
- Garcinia lauterbachiana A.C.Sm.
- Garcinia ledermannii Lauterb.
- Garcinia leggeae W.E.Cooper
- Garcinia leptophylla Bittrich
- Garcinia letestui Pellegr.
- Garcinia linearifolia Elmer
- Garcinia linearis Pierre
- Garcinia linii C.E.Chang
- Garcinia livingstonei T.Anderson
- Garcinia loheri Merr.
- Garcinia longifolia Blume
- Garcinia longipedicellata Kosterm.
- Garcinia lowryi Z.S.Rogers & P.W.Sweeney
- Garcinia lucens Pierre
- Garcinia lucida Vesque
- Garcinia lujae De Wild.
- Garcinia luzoniensis Merr.

== M ==
- Garcinia macgregorii Merr.
- Garcinia macrantha A.C.Sm.
- Garcinia macrophylla Mart.
- Garcinia madagascariensis (Planch. & Triana) Baill. ex Pierre
- Garcinia madruno (Kunth) Hammel
- Garcinia magnifolia (Pittier) Hammel
- Garcinia magnophylla (Cuatrec.) Hammel
- Garcinia maingayi Hook.f. ex T.Anderson
- Garcinia maluensis Lauterb.
- Garcinia mammeoides Kosterm.
- Garcinia mangorensis (R.Vig. & Humbert) P.W.Sweeney & Z.S.Rogers
- Garcinia mangostana L.
- Garcinia mangostifera Kaneh. & Hatus.
- Garcinia mannii Oliv.
- Garcinia marienii (Staner) P.W.Sweeney
- Garcinia martinii (Maguire) Govaerts
- Garcinia matsudae Kaneh.
- Garcinia mckeaniana Craib
- Garcinia megistophylla P.W.Sweeney & Z.S.Rogers
- Garcinia memecyloides Ridl.
- Garcinia merguensis Wight
- Garcinia mestonii F.M.Bailey
- Garcinia microcarpa Pierre
- Garcinia microphylla Merr.
- Garcinia microstigma Kurz
- Garcinia microtropidiiformis Kaneh. & Hatus.
- Garcinia minahassensis Pierre
- Garcinia mindanaensis Merr.
- Garcinia minimiflora Ridl.
- Garcinia minutiflora Ridl.
- Garcinia miquelii Pierre
- Garcinia moaensis (Bisse) Borhidi
- Garcinia monantha Ridl.
- Garcinia montana Ridl.
- Garcinia moseleyana Pierre
- Garcinia moszkowskii Lauterb.
- Garcinia mottleyana Pierre
- Garcinia moulmeinensis Pierre ex Vesque
- Garcinia multibracteolata Merr.
- Garcinia multifida (H.Perrier) P.W.Sweeney & Z.S.Rogers
- Garcinia multiflora Champ. ex Benth.
- Garcinia mungotia Planch. ex Pierre
- Garcinia murdochii Ridl.
- Garcinia murtonii Whitmore
- Garcinia myristicifolia Pierre
- Garcinia myrtifolia A.C.Sm.

== N-P ==
- Garcinia neglecta Vieill.
- Garcinia nervosa (Miq.) Miq.
- Garcinia nigricans Pierre
- Garcinia nigrolineata Planch. ex T.Anderson
- Garcinia nitida Pierre
- Garcinia novoguineensis Vesque
- Garcinia nubigena Lauterb.
- Garcinia nujiangensis C.Y.Wu & Y.H.Li
- Garcinia nuntasaenii Ngerns. & Suddee
- Garcinia obliqua Sosef & Dauby
- Garcinia oblongifolia Champ. ex Benth.
- Garcinia ochracea Nazre
- Garcinia oleosperma P.W.Sweeney
- Garcinia oligantha Merr.
- Garcinia oligophlebia Merr.
- Garcinia oliveri Pierre
- Garcinia ophiticola (Borhidi) Borhidi
- Garcinia oreophila Lauterb.
- Garcinia orthoclada Baker
- Garcinia ovalifolia Oliv.
- Garcinia pachyantha A.C.Sm.
- Garcinia pachycarpa (A.C.Sm.) Kosterm.
- Garcinia pachyclada N.Robson
- Garcinia pachypetala Lauterb.
- Garcinia pacifica Merr.
- Garcinia pallida Lauterb.
- Garcinia pallide-sanguinea Lauterb.
- Garcinia pancheri Pierre
- Garcinia parviflora Benth.
- Garcinia parvifolia (Miq.) Miq.
- Garcinia parvula (H.Perrier) P.W.Sweeney & Z.S.Rogers
- Garcinia pauciflora Baker
- Garcinia paucinervis Chun & F.C.How
- Garcinia pedicellata (G.Forst.) Seem.
- Garcinia pedunculata Roxb. ex Buch.-Ham.
- Garcinia penangiana Pierre
- Garcinia perrieri (R.Vig. & Humbert) ined.
- Garcinia pervillei (Planch. & Triana) Vesque
- Garcinia petiolaris Pierre
- Garcinia phuongmaiensis V.S.Dang, H.Toyama & D.L.A.Tuan
- Garcinia picrorhiza Miq.
- Garcinia platyphylla A.C.Sm.
- Garcinia plena Craib
- Garcinia pluvialis ined.
- Garcinia poilanei Gagnep.
- Garcinia polyneura (Urb.) Borhidi
- Garcinia ponapensis Lauterb.
- Garcinia portoricensis (Urb.) Alain
- Garcinia prainiana King
- Garcinia preussii Engl.
- Garcinia pseudoguttifera Seem.
- Garcinia puat (Montrouz.) Guillaumin
- Garcinia pullei Lauterb.
- Garcinia pulvinata (Planch. & Triana) Hammel
- Garcinia punctata Oliv.
- Garcinia pungens Borhidi
- Garcinia pushpangadaniana T.Sabu, N.Mohanan, Krishnaraj & Shareef
- Garcinia pyrifera Ridl.

== Q-S ==
- Garcinia qinzhouensis Y.X.Liang & Z.M.Wu
- Garcinia quadrifaria (Oliv.) Baill. ex Pierre
- Garcinia quadrilocularis Seeth.
- Garcinia quaesita Pierre
- Garcinia ramosii Merr.
- Garcinia ramulosa Lauterb.
- Garcinia revoluta (Urb.) Borhidi
- Garcinia rheedei Pierre
- Garcinia rhizophoroides Elmer
- Garcinia rhynchophylla A.C.Sm.
- Garcinia rigida Miq.
- Garcinia riparia A.C.Sm.
- Garcinia robsoniana Bamps
- Garcinia rostrata (Hassk.) Miq.
- Garcinia rubra Merr.
- Garcinia rubriflora Boerl.
- Garcinia rubrisepala Y.H.Li
- Garcinia rubroechinata Kosterm.
- Garcinia rumiyo Kaneh.
- Garcinia rupestris Lauterb.
- Garcinia ruscifolia (Griseb.) Borhidi
- Garcinia russellii W.E.Cooper
- Garcinia sabangensis Lauterb.
- Garcinia salakensis Pierre
- Garcinia samarensis Merr.
- Garcinia sampitana Diels
- Garcinia sangudsangud Nazre
- Garcinia sarawhensis Pierre
- Garcinia scaphopetala B.L.Burtt
- Garcinia schlecbteri Lauterb.
- Garcinia schomburgkiana Pierre
- Garcinia schraderi Lauterb.
- Garcinia scortechinii King
- Garcinia segmentata Kosterm.
- Garcinia semseii Verdc.
- Garcinia septogarcinia I.M.Turner & L.V.S.Jenn.
- Garcinia serpentini Borhidi
- Garcinia sessiliflora (Poir.) ined.
- Garcinia sessilis (G.Forst.) Seem.
- Garcinia sibeswarii Shameer, J.Sarma, N.Mohanan & A.Begum
- Garcinia siripatanadilokii Ngerns., Meeprom, Boonth., Chamch. & Sinbumr.
- Garcinia sizygiifolia Pierre
- Garcinia smeathmannii (Planch. & Triana) Oliv.
- Garcinia smithii Kosterm.
- Garcinia solomonensis A.C.Sm.
- Garcinia sopsopia (Buch.-Ham.) Mabb.
- Garcinia speciosa Wall.
- Garcinia spicata (Wight & Arn.) Hook.f.
- Garcinia spruceana (Engl.) Mouzinho
- Garcinia squamata Lauterb.
- Garcinia staneriana (Exell & Mendonça) P.W.Sweeney
- Garcinia staudtii Engl.
- Garcinia stigmacantha Pierre
- Garcinia stipulata T.Anderson
- Garcinia stuhlmannii (Engl.) P.W.Sweeney
- Garcinia subelliptica Merr.
- Garcinia subfalcata Y.H.Li & F.N.Wei
- Garcinia subtilinervis F.Muell.
- Garcinia succifolia Kurz
- Garcinia sulphurea Elmer
- Garcinia sumbawensis Lauterb.

== T-Z ==
- Garcinia talbotii Raizada ex Santapau
- Garcinia tanzaniensis Verdc.
- Garcinia tauensis Lauterb.
- Garcinia terpnophylla Thwaites
- Garcinia tetralata C.Y.Wu ex Y.H.Li
- Garcinia tetrandra Pierre
- Garcinia teysmanniana Scheff.
- Garcinia thorelii Pierre
- Garcinia thouvenotii (H.Perrier) P.W.Sweeney & Z.S.Rogers
- Garcinia thwaitesii Pierre
- Garcinia timorensis Zipp. ex Span.
- Garcinia tonkinensis Vesque
- Garcinia torensis Lauterb.
- Garcinia travancorica Bedd.
- Garcinia treubii Pierre
- Garcinia trianii Pierre
- Garcinia tsaratananae (H.Perrier) P.W.Sweeney & Z.S.Rogers
- Garcinia tsimatimia P.W.Sweeney & Z.S.Rogers
- Garcinia tuberculata Lauterb.
- Garcinia ulugurensis (Engl.) P.W.Sweeney
- Garcinia umbellulata Ridl.
- Garcinia umbonata Lauterb.
- Garcinia uniflora King
- Garcinia urceolata Munzinger, Bruy & M.Pignal
- Garcinia urophylla Scort. ex King
- Garcinia urschii (H.Perrier) P.W.Sweeney & Z.S.Rogers
- Garcinia valetoniana Lauterb.
- Garcinia venulosa (Blanco) Choisy
- Garcinia verrucosa Jum. & H.Perrier
- Garcinia versteegii Lauterb.
- Garcinia verticillata Alain
- Garcinia vidalii Merr.
- Garcinia vidua Ridl.
- Garcinia vieillardii Pierre
- Garcinia virgata (Vieill. ex Guillaumin) Govaerts
- Garcinia viridiflora Ridl.
- Garcinia vitiensis (A.Gray) Seem.
- Garcinia volkensii Engl.
- Garcinia vriesiana Pierre
- Garcinia warburgiana A.C.Sm.
- Garcinia warrenii F.Muell.
- Garcinia whitfordii Merr.
- Garcinia wichmannii Lauterb.
- Garcinia wightii T.Anderson
- Garcinia wollastonii Ridl.
- Garcinia xanthochymus Hook.f. ex T.Anderson
- Garcinia xishuanbannaensis Y.H.Li
- Garcinia xylosperma Pierre
- Garcinia yaatapsap K.Armstr. & P.W.Sweeney
- Garcinia yunnanensis Hu
- Garcinia zeylanica Roxb.
- Garcinia zichii W.E.Cooper
