= Allanblackia oil =

Vegetable oil

Allanblackia oil is a vegetable oil that comes from the seeds of several species of trees in the former genus Allanblackia, now considered a synonym of Garcinia. This tree can be found in the wet tropical belt of Africa. Because of its unique blend of fatty acids, the oil from Allanblackia seeds has melting properties that make it excellent to use as structuring fat in food products, e.g. margarines.

Currently, Allanblackia seeds are harvested in the wild to produce the oil, but these producers cannot produce enough oil to meet market demand. Finding sustainable ways to increase production could bring many social, environmental, and economic benefits to the communities which produce Allanblackia. To ensure increased production is sustainable and benefits the communities growing the trees, a number of organizations have collaborated to develop a set of standards and methods as guidelines for increasing Allanblackia production. Other organizations are working to establish tree nurseries and other sustainable means of domesticating Allanblackia.

== Allanblackia tree ==
=== Origin ===
Allanblackia oil is an edible vegetable oil derived from the seeds from the fruits of Allanblackia trees. This is an evergreen tree producing big brown fruits. Inside those fruits are the seeds that contain the allanblackia oil.

The genus Allanblackia, which belongs to the family Clusiaceae, formerly included of nine (possibly ten) tree species, all restricted to Africa. These species are now included in the large pantropical genus Garcinia. Allanblackia trees are dioecious (having separate male and female trees) and mostly very similar to each other. Allanblackia trees are commonly found in the wet tropical rain belt of West, Central and East Africa (from Sierra Leone to Tanzania). They grow primarily in tropical rainforests, but can also be found on cultivated farmland areas. Currently, the most important source of allanblackia oil is Garcinia stuhlmannii (Allanblackia stuhlmannii), which is found in the northeast of Tanzania in the Eastern Arc Mountains. Other species are Garcinia alepensis (Allanblackia parviflora), native to Upper Guinea from Ghana westwards, and Garcinia oleosperma (Allanblackia floribunda), native to Nigeria, Cameroon, Gabon, and Democratic Republic of the Congo. These species occur in moist low-land areas (G. alepensis and G. oleosperma) or upland rain forests (G. stuhlmannii).

Allanblackia trees are single-stemmed, up to 40 meters tall, with whorled branches. The tree will start fruiting at the age of about 8 years and in know to fruit for a long period (likely > 50 years). The fruits of the tree are amongst the biggest of all plants in the African rainforest (particularly A. stuhlmannii). A fruit can weigh up to 7 kilograms (average 4 kg) of which 20% is wet seeds (40–50 seeds per pod).

=== Genus name ===
The genus Allanblackia was named in honour of the botanist Allan Black. He was the first curator of Kew Gardens and was responsible for the private collection of Charles Darwin. Very respected amongst his peers, he died at a young age aboard ship off the Cocos (Keeling) Islands in the Bay of Bengal and the genus Allanblackia was named in his memory. The name of Allanblackia trees used by the indigenous people in Tanzania is actually msambu or mkimbo in Swahili or sometimes mkani (mkanyi, mkany) in local languages. In Nigeria area of Rivers State the local name used is obiobo obo.

== Allanblackia seed oil ==
=== Composition ===
Allanblackia seeds consist of a soft fruit body mesocarp surrounded by hard wooden hull. De-hulled and dried Allanblackia floribunda seeds from Ghana contain up to 70% oil. Taking the weight of the hull into account, the oil content is in the range of 40–50%.

Allanblackia seed oil is unusual in that it is composed of only a few triglycerides, derived from palmitic, oleic, and stearic acids. This is similar to other tropical fats like shea and cocoa butter. However, Allanblackia has an unusually high stearic acid content above 50%. More specifically Allanblackia seed oil contains 52-58% stearic acid, 39-45% oleic acid and 2-3% palmitic acid.

A key characteristic is that the fatty acids are organized into a two main triglycerides. These are called 1,3-distearoyl-2-oleoyl-glycerol (abbreviated as SOS at an average level of 69%) and 1,2-dioleoyl-3-stearoyl-sn-glycerol (abbreviated as sn-SOO at an average level of 23%).

This simple triglyceride composition provides Allanblackia seed oil with very steep melting behavior. This composition makes it useful for making food products such as margarine, without any further modification like fractionation of fractional crystallization. The melting point is around 34 °C. Specific physical characteristics of SOS-SOO mixtures, like fat crystallization aspects, have extensively been investigated in model systems.

| Characteristic | Unit | Value |
|---|---|---|
| Melting range | °C | 42–44 |
| (Slip) melting point | °C | 34–35 |
| Solids value – 20 [°C] | % | 73.5 |
| Solids value – 30 [°C] | % | 46.5 |
| Solids value – 40 [°C] | % | 0 |
| Refractive index [60 °C] | – | 1,46 |
| Specific gravity [60 °C] | kg/dm3 | 0.89 |
| Saponification value | mg KOH/g | 200 |
| Unsaponifiable matter | % | 0.54–0.65 |
| Iodine value | g/100g | 35–39 |

== Seed production ==
=== Introduction ===
The volumes of Allanblackia seeds, and hence seed oil, produced until now very low. The volume of allanblackia seed oil is in the range of 100 metric tonnes per annum only.

These volumes are generated by wild-harvesting mainly done by collectors in Tanzania. When initial studies on the potential of wild-harvesting were done in the early 2000s, the expectations were very high predicting annual production of up to 40,000 tonnes of seeds. In reality only a few tonnes of seeds were harvested in the first year as the number of wild Allanblackia trees that could actually be harvested had severely been overestimated.

Since early 2009, NGOs such as The World Agroforestry Centre (ICRAF), the International Union for Conservation of Nature (IUCN) and commercial parties have been conducting research programs to investigate the potential to increase the annual production volumes by looking at increased wild-harvesting as well as sustainable domestication of the tree. Through the plantation of the tree with local farmers in Tanzania, Ghana and Nigeria, the production volumes are expected to increase in the coming decade, once these trees are old enough to starting producing fruits and big enough to carry more of the large fruit pods.

=== Wild harvesting ===
Increasing the volumes obviously must be done sustainably and hence socio-economic and environmental aspects are being looked at. For example, the value of Allanblackia as a new cash (annual) crop for Africa means training of local communities not to cut Allanblackia trees for use as timber and firewood. But doing so is also a means of helping to conserve local biodiversity. The Union for Ethical Biotrade (UEBT) has developed a standard and a verification framework against which the sustainability of the Allanblackia supply chain can be audited and approved. UEBT is a member of the International Social and Environmental Accreditation and Labelling Alliance, which promotes sustainability standards.

=== Domestication ===
Wild harvesting as a production method is limited because there are not enough trees to satisfy demand and Allanblackia's flowering and fruiting behavior is erratic. Since 2006, Novel Development Tanzania has been involved in a domestication program together with the World Agroforestry Centre to domesticate the species using participatory tree domestication approach. The program includes community sensitization, exploration, participatory selections of superior mother trees, conservation in field gene banks, development of agroforestry systems with Allanblackia and market development. Secondly, the program consists of developing asexual and sexual propagation protocols, which are necessary to overcome challenges in multiplication such as seed dormancy, long juvenile phase and high variability of desired traits. The domestication program of Allanblackia through public-private partnership and participatory tree domestication could serve as a model for domestication of other underutilized African tree species of high economic potential.

== Oil production ==
=== Seed harvesting and drying ===
- An individual tree can produce up to 300 fruits a year, with the average bearing 100 to 150 in a good season. In Ghana Allanblackia parviflora fruits have been reported to have a weight of 1.5–2 kg. The fruit pods from the Tanzanian Allanblackia stuhlmannii weigh on average 4 kilogram with a maximum up to 7 kilograms. The may containing up to 40-50 separate seeds embedded in a pulp.
- When the fruit are ripe they will fall down to the ground. Harvesters will collect these fallen fruits and manually extract and clean the seeds. These are then laid out in the sun to dry; this generally takes one to two weeks.

=== Seed quality ===
- After drying the seeds are bagged and brought to collection centers by the farmers / collectors for sale.
- Upon drying the color of the inside (mesocarp) of the seeds will change from off-white (wet) to ocreous-brown (dry).
- In the collection centers this change of color is used to determine the overall quality of drying of each bag of seeds (20–40 kg) by testing a random sample of seeds.
- Next to that seeds are checked for the amount of dirt, while broken seeds are removed. Also seeds infected by insects are removed. Such seeds can be recognized by small holes present in the outer shell of the seeds.
- The seeds collected are put into bags again and brought to a local warehouse waiting to be transported to the oil mill.

=== Seed and oil processing ===
- From local warehouses the seeds are brought to a central warehouse at the oil mill to press-out the oil. In Tanzania the Allanblackia Oil Mill is in the coastal city of Tanga, in the north-east of the country.
- In the mill the seeds are taken out of the bags and stored locally until crushing. For the crushing a seed-oil press is used, separating the oil from the residual fibrous cake.
- The crude oil is decanted and filtered to remove remaining solids.
- The oil is than stored at 40–45 °C to keep it liquid and pumped to an Iso-container for further transport.
- The remaining cake from the pressing still contains fibers and residual oil] and therefore it is used as a renewable source of energy in the oil mill, generating steam in a high pressure steam boiler.
- After transport to the country where the final product manufacturing will take place, the oil is purified according to standard practices to remove unwanted free fatty acids and off-taste, making the oil ready for use in manufacturing of products, e.g. margarines.

== Application in product ==
=== Historical use ===
In Tanzania the use of allanblackia seed oil goes back almost a century. It has been reported that during the First World War allanblackia oil was already tested as a cocoa butter alternative. Also in the seventies the such application was again explored in Europe. However the application never hit the market because larger volumes of the oil were simply not available due to the lack of an organized supply chain.

Nowadays there is still in hardly any local use of Allanblackia seed oil as people prefer use of easily available liquid oils and cheap industrial soaps. The allanblackia tree has predominantly been used for timber in the last decades and hence the number of trees has significantly reduced. Most of the allanblackia trees nowadays remaining in the wild are growing in the East Usambara Mountains which provides the right climate for this tree. As a result, even today the volumes of oil available from wild-harvesting are still very small.

=== Current use ===
The major application potential identified today is in the use as a structuring fat to produce low-trans margarines and dairy cream alternatives, and as cocoa butter equivalent in confectionery applications. In the European Union as of December 2014, all different types of vegetable oils will be listed on the ingredient label of food products using those ingredients. Recently Allanblackia seed oil was introduced in margarine and can be found as such on the product ingredient list.

== See also ==
- Agroforestry
- Tropical agriculture
