= Lemon drop =

Lemon drop may refer to:

== Food and drink ==
- Lemon drop (candy), a type of candy
- Lemon drop (cocktail), a vodka-based cocktail

== Plants ==
- Lemon drop mangosteen, two species of trees
- Lemon drop pepper, a pepper variety
- Sunquat, also known as lemondrop, a variety of citrus fruit

== Music ==
- Vintage V100MRPGM Lemon Drop, guitar
- "Lemon Drop" (song), by Ateez
- "Lemon Drop", a bop standard tune written by George Wallington
- "Lemon Drop", a song by Logic from Supermarket

== See also ==
- The Lemon Drop Kid, 1951 comedy film based on the short story of the same name by Damon Runyon
- Lemon Drop Kid (born 1996), racehorse
- The Mighty Lemon Drops, an English rock band
