= Balakrishnan Thevar =

Indian Film Producer director

Balakrishnan Thevar (born 25 April 1972), fondly called Bala, is associated with the Indian film industry as associate director, executive producer and actor. He has straddled the world of both feature and ad films in different capacities. One of the landmark movies he has been a part of, on the Direction team is Neerja, which bagged two honours at the 64th National Film Awards.

Bala forayed into the Indian film industry in 2007 with Gandhi, My Father, as the director's assistant and supervising sound editor. He also acted in this Feroz Abbas Khan-directed film. Thereafter, he worked with leading production houses like Dharma Productions (Kurbaan, Student of the Year, Ungli) and Sanjay Leela Bhansali Films, Viacom 18 Motion Pictures & Shabinaa Khan's (Gabbar is Back), Hari Om Entertainment and Farah Khan's (Joker), amongst others and auteur directors like Pankaj Kapur (Mausam), Rensil D'Silva (Kurbaan) and Ram Madhvani's (Neerja). In the recently released film, Noor (21 April 2017), directed by Sunhil Sippy, he was on board as associate director.

He has gained global cinematic experience by working on German films and a Hollywood movie, (Basmati Blues), directed by Dan Baron.

== Early and personal life ==
Bala was born in Mumbai to Subbiah Thevar and Rukhmini Thevar. His paternal uncle Sandow M. M. A. Chinnappa Thevar, owner of the famous banner Devar Films, was an eminent producer of Tamil films in the mid-1950s, 1960s and 1970s. He has produced numerous movies with M. G. Ramachandran as the lead actor, and was famous for his films featuring animals. Sandow had also produced the Rajesh Khanna's hit film Haathi Mere Saathi (1971).

Bala graduated from SIES College with a degree in arts, and he was always creatively inclined with a keen passion for photography.

During his growing years, he gained knowledge about construction, as his father was in that field. After school, Bala started building his career and at the same time completed his education. While he was still in college, he did still photography for the popular TV serial, Mahabharata, made under the B. R. Chopra banner. After college, he started his own agency Thevar Design Studio, where he designed below the line campaigns for numerous prominent brands.

== Career ==
=== Films ===
Bala's journey in the Indian film industry began with Feroz Abbas Khan's Gandhi, My Father in 2007, which was produced by Anil Kapoor. He had just wrapped up his agency and was taking a break, when the film came his way. The film was his training ground and charted the future course of his film career. Not only was he the director's Assistant and Supervising Sound Editor on the film, he also managed to bag a small role in it.

In the years to follow, he donned different hats like First Assistant Director (The Legend of Drona, Mausam, Neerja), Chief Assistant Director (Kurbaan, Student of the Year, Shimla Mirch {unreleased}), associate director (Joker, Gabbar is Back, Noor), Post Production Supervisor (Pehla Sitara) and Schedule Planner (Arranged Marriage {unreleased}).

Internationally, Bala has worked on several German films and was the First Assistant Director on the Hollywood movie, Basmati Blues, directed by Dan Baron and starring Brie Larson, Scott Bakula, and Donald Sutherland. It was shot in the picturesque Kerala in 2013.

=== Television ===
Bala was a college student, when driven by his passion for photography he bagged the Still Photography project for the blockbuster serial, Mahabharata by B. R. Chopra.

Later in his television career, Bala directed an important episode of Razia Sultan and Jodha Akbar of the historical serial Rakkt on Epic channel.

Ambitious of reviving his family banner, Devar Films, Bala produced certain episodes of the Doordarshan series, Main Kuchh Bhi Kar Sakti Hoon, which addresses regressive practices against women. The series is directed by Feroz Abbas Khan and has Farhan Akhtar as its narrator.

=== Ad Films ===
==== Chief Assistant Director ====
Bala's repertoire includes numerous ad films for noted brands including Lux, Domino's Pizza, West Bengal Tourism, Milo, Coca-Cola, i-Pad Air, Meswak, and Bru Coffee.

==== Executive producer ====
On the herbal toothpaste brand, Meswak, Bala also took charge as Executive Producer.

==== Actor ====
In addition to direction and production, Bala has faced the camera for Bru Coffee in which he played a pivotal role.

== Filmography ==
Film	Year of release	Role
Noor	2017	Associate Director
Basmati Blues	2017	First Assistant Director
Neerja	2016	First Assistant Director
Gabbar Is Back	2015	Associate Director
Ungli	2014	Chief Assistant Director
Student Of the Year	2012	Chief Assistant Director
Joker	2012	Associate Director
Pehla Sitara	2012	Post Production Supervisor
Mausam	2011	First Assistant Director
Kurbaan	2009	Chief Assistant Director
The Legend Of Drona	2008	First Assistant Director
Gandhi, My Father	2007	Assistant to Director, Supervising Sound Editor
Shimla Mirchi	In Post Production	Chief Assistant Director
Arranged Marriage	NA	Schedule Planner
GOLD	2018	First Assistant Director
SYERAA	2019(In Production)	First Assistant Director
