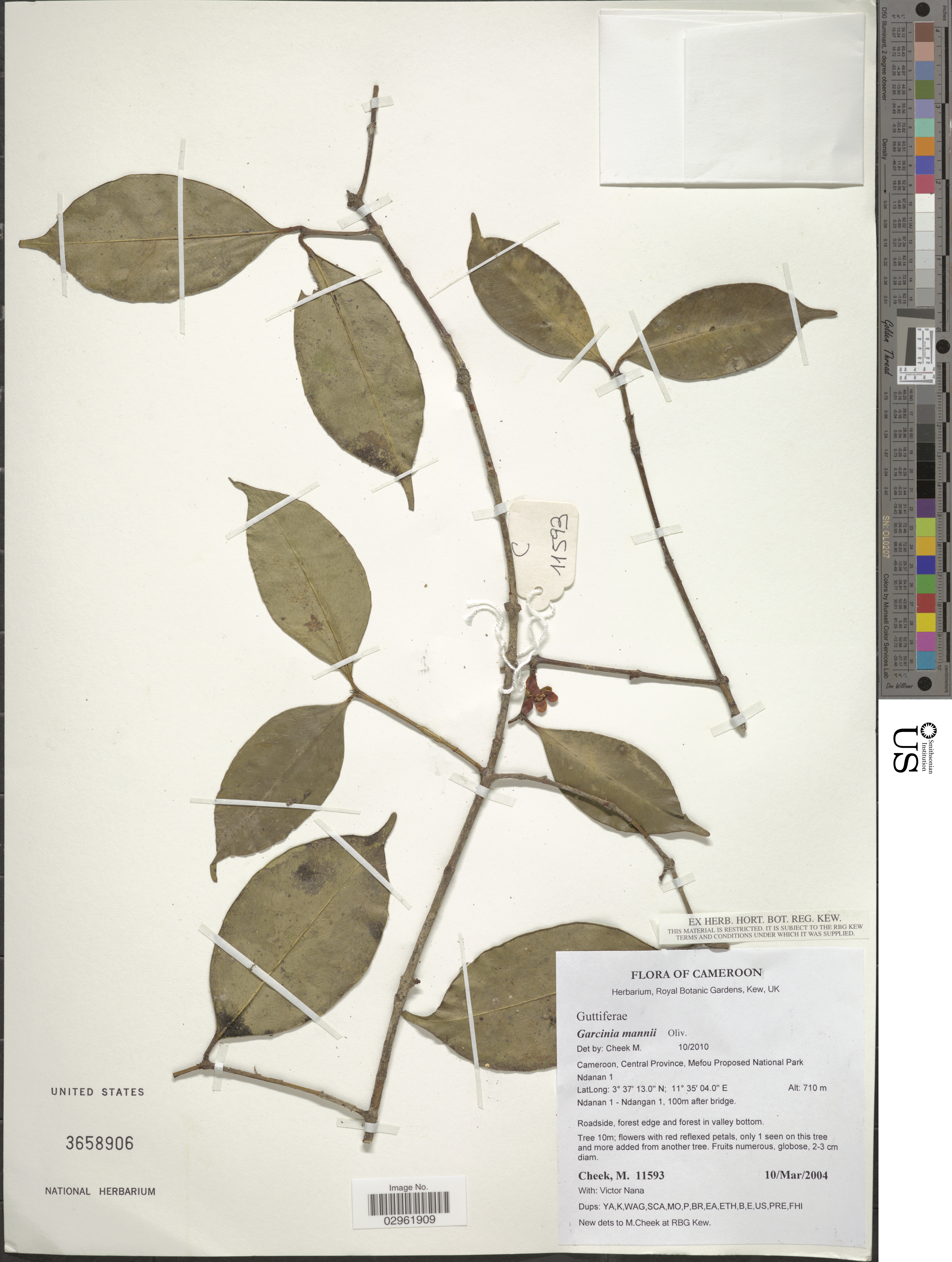
- Leaves and petioles of the Garcinia mannii tree

Conservation status
- Least Concern (IUCN 3.1)

Scientific classification
- Kingdom: Plantae
- Clade: Embryophytes
- Clade: Tracheophytes
- Clade: Angiosperms
- Clade: Eudicots
- Clade: Rosids
- Order: Malpighiales
- Family: Clusiaceae
- Genus: Garcinia
- Species: G. mannii

Binomial name
- Garcinia mannii Oliv. (1868)

Synonyms
- Garcinia obanensis Baker f.

= Garcinia mannii =

Species of plant

Garcinia mannii is a dioecious and evergreen flowering tree in the family Clusiaceae (Guttiferae). The specific epithet (mannii) honors German botanist Gustav Mann.

== Range and habitat ==
Garcinia mannii is native to western and west-central tropical Africa, ranging from southern Nigeria through Cameroon, Equatorial Guinea, and Gabon to the Republic of the Congo and Cabinda Province of Angola. It grows in lowland tropical rain forest.

== Description ==
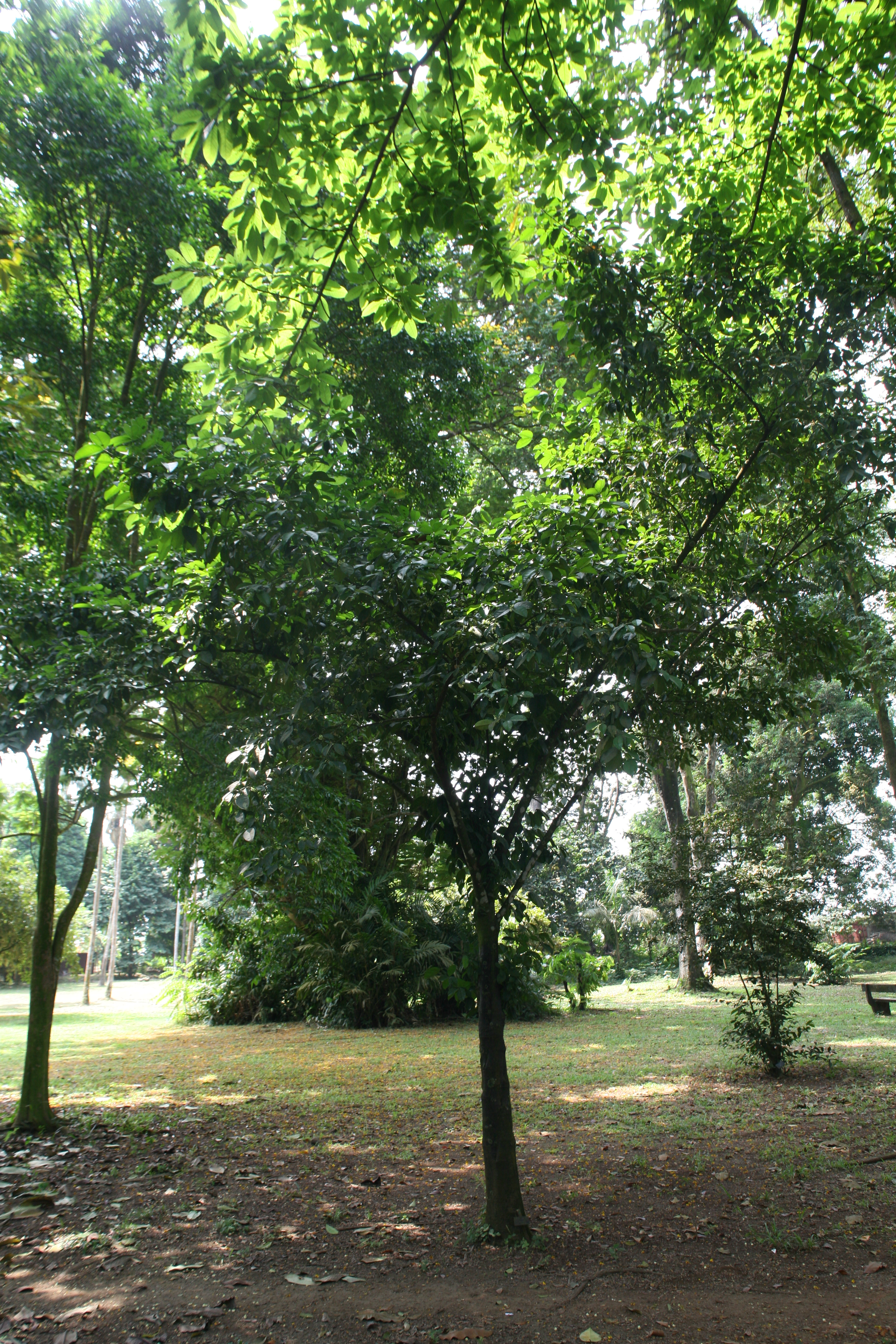
Young Garcinia mannii tree at the Limbe Botanical Garden in Cameroon

Its leaves are elliptical in shape and slightly rounded, and the flowers have four red petals with yellow-orange centers. They occur on long stems in clusters of 1–2. Mature trees are often densely branched, with the foliage often concealing the trunk. The branches often appear relatively close to the ground. The bark is brown in color and relatively smooth.

== Uses ==
Due to the chemical composition of the plant, it is used as a chewing stick across its native range.

== See also ==
- List of Garcinia species
