= Teeth-cleaning twig =

Plant branch chewed for oral hygiene

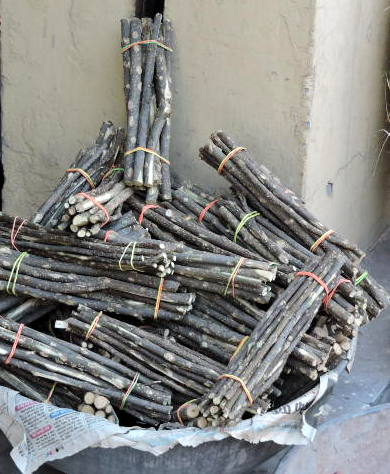
Bunches of teeth cleaning twigs near Kalka, India

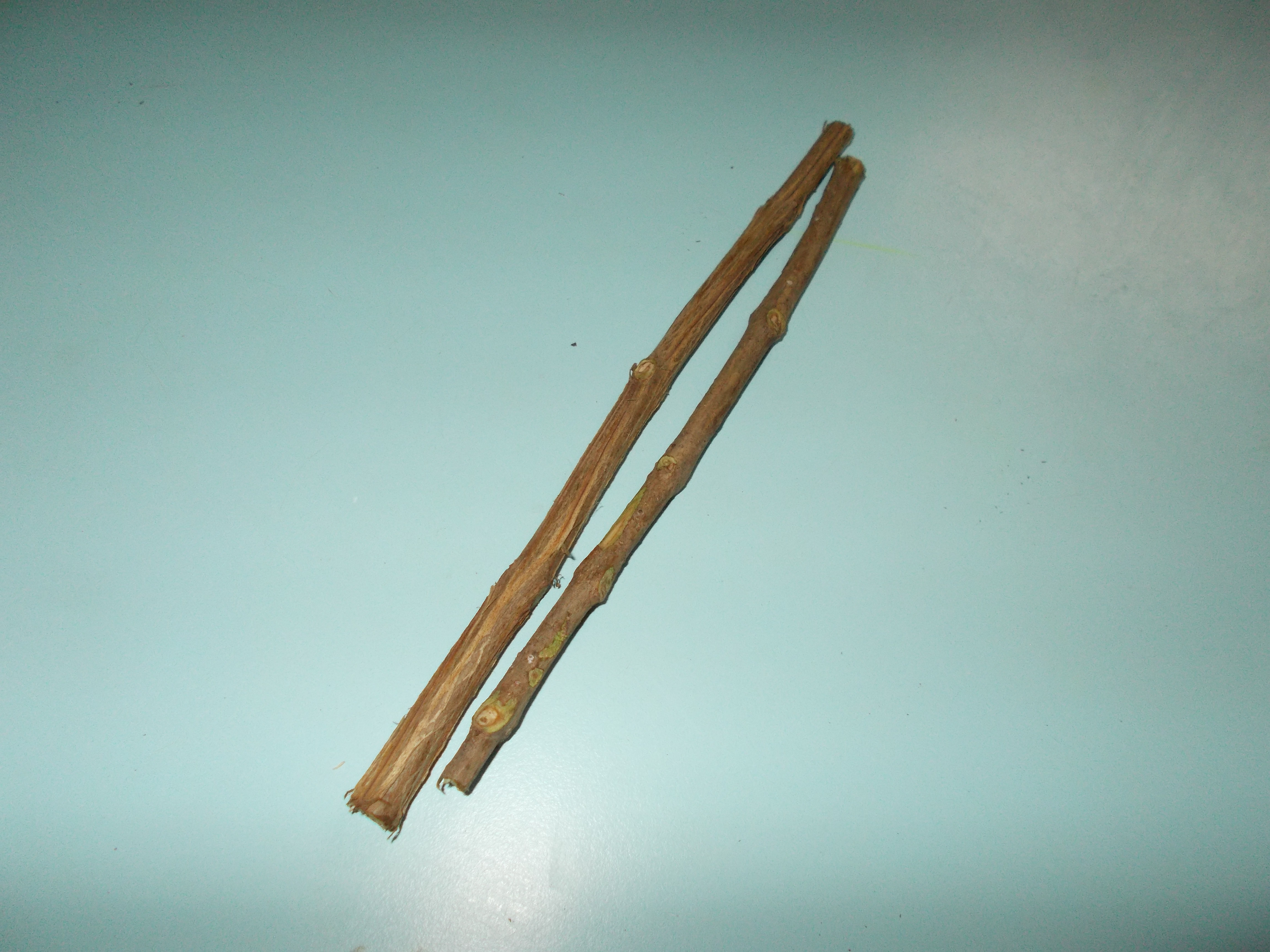
Teeth-cleaning twig from a guava tree

A teeth-cleaning twig (Hindi: datwoon) is an oral hygiene tool made from a twig from a tree. It can help to prevent tooth decay and gum disease.

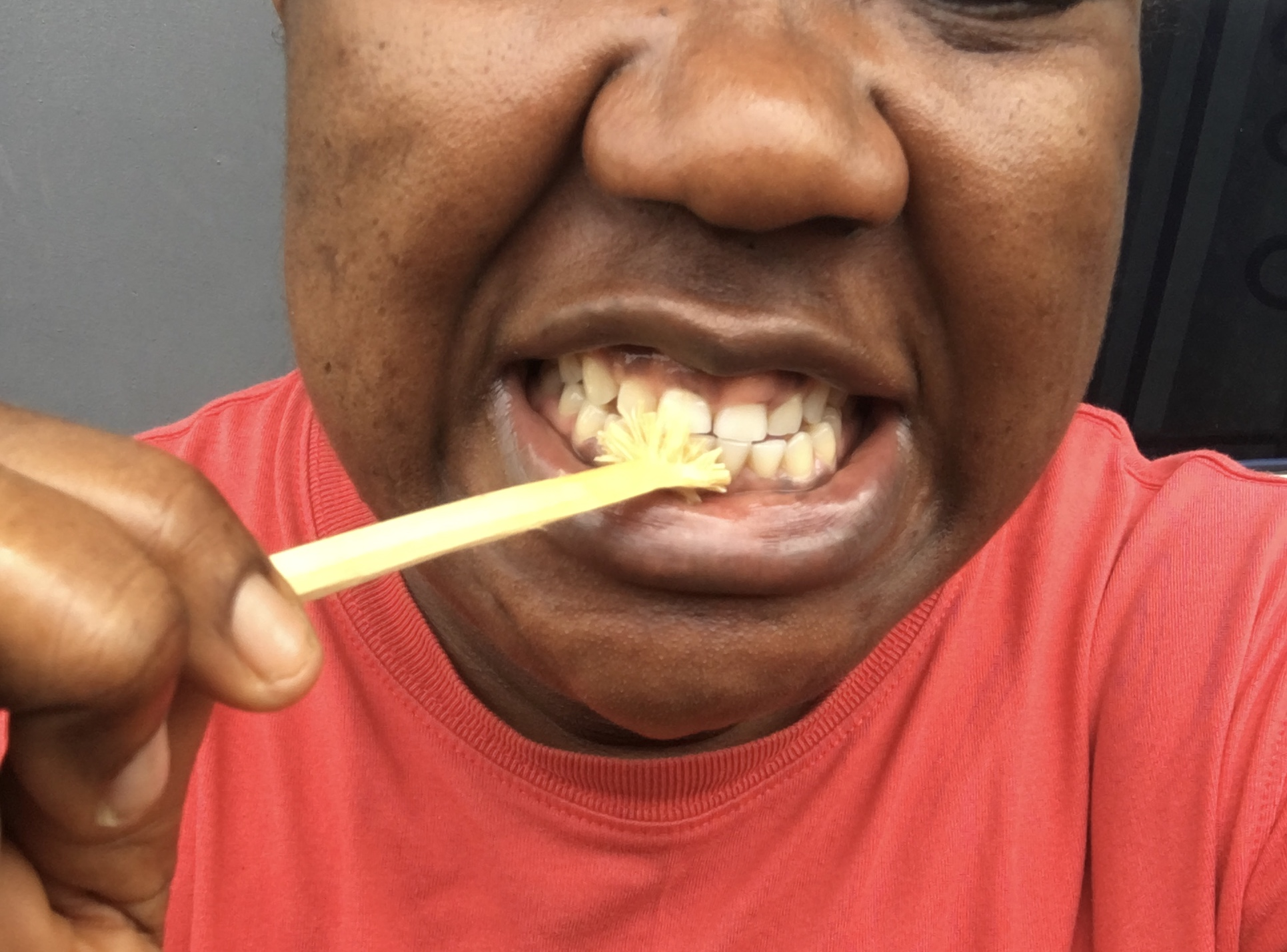
Some plants produce inner fibers suitable for making bristles

== Denominations ==
Tooth sticks often take the same name as the trees or plants from which they come.

== History ==
The oral hygiene practice using herbal sticks exists in many parts of the world since ancient times, for example in ancient India, ancient Greece (mentioned by Alciphron), ancient Rome, ancient Israel (mentioned in Talmud), and Eastern Asia (mentioned in the Gospel of Buddhism).

Chew sticks are twigs or roots of certain plants that are chewed until one end is frayed. This end can be used to brush against the teeth, while the other end can be used as a toothpick. The earliest chew sticks have been dated to Babylonia in 3500 BCE and an Egyptian tomb from 3000 BCE. They are mentioned in Chinese records dating from 1600 BCE, in the Ayurvedas around 4th century BCE, and in Tipitaka in the Buddhist Canon around the 5th century BCE in India.

The Indian way of using tooth wood for brushing is presented by the Chinese monk Yijing (635–713 CE) when he describes the rules for monks in his book:

Every day in the morning, a monk must chew a piece of tooth wood to brush his teeth and scrape his tongue, and this must be done in the proper way. Only after one has washed one's hands and mouth may one make salutations. Otherwise both the saluter and the saluted are at fault. In Sanskrit, the tooth wood is known as the dantakastha—danta meaning tooth, and kastha, a piece of wood. It is twelve finger-widths in length. The shortest is not less than eight finger-widths long, resembling the little finger in size. Chew one end of the wood well for a long while and then brush the teeth with it.

A wide variety of plants can be used as dantakastha.

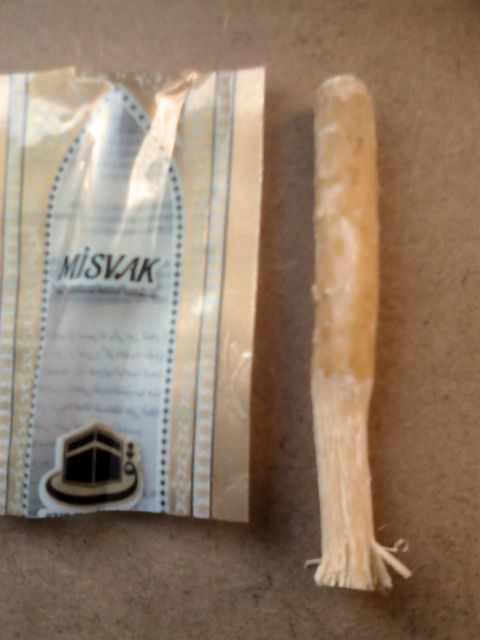
A miswak with contemporary plastic packaging, the outer bark has been peeled or cut away to create usable cleaning bristles at the bottom

In Africa, many kinds of sticks exist and many plants and trees are used to produce them by various peoples, ethnicities and tribes. African chew sticks are often made from the tree Salvadora persica, also known as the "toothbrush tree".

In Islam, this tree is traditionally used to create a chew stick called miswak, as frequently advocated for in the hadith (written traditions relating to the life of Muhammad).

In South India, neem is used as a teeth cleaning twig. Neem, in full bloom, can aid in healing by keeping the area clean and disinfected. There is an old Tamil proverb praising the twig, comparing it with the moral works of Naladiyar and the Kural, which says that both of the works are very good in expressing human thoughts just as the twigs of the banyan and the neem trees are good in maintaining the teeth.

ஆலும் வேலும் பல்லுக்குறுதி; நாலும் இரண்டும் சொல்லுக்குறுதி.
(Aalum vaelum pallukkuruthi; naalum irandum sollukkuruthi)
Literal translation: "Banyan and neem maintain oral health; Four and Two maintain moral health."
(Here "Four" and "Two" refer to the quatrains and couplets of the Naladiyar and the Kural text, respectively.)

Traditional Sikhs still use datun today as it is written in their scriptures:

ਦਾਤਨ ਕਰੇ ਨਿਤ ਨੀਤ ਨਾ ਦੁਖ ਪਾਵੈ ਲਾਲ ਜੀ ॥ (੨੩)

Translation:

Dear/beloved, natural twig, brush everyday, and pains you shall never get. (23)

— Guru Gobind Singh, Tankhah Naama, as written down by Bhai Nand Lal

== Twigs used ==
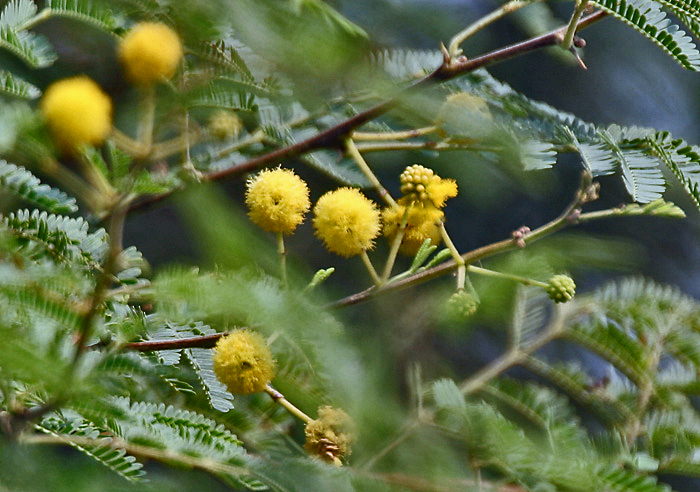
Spring blossoms of kikar (babool) at Hodal in Faridabad, Haryana, India

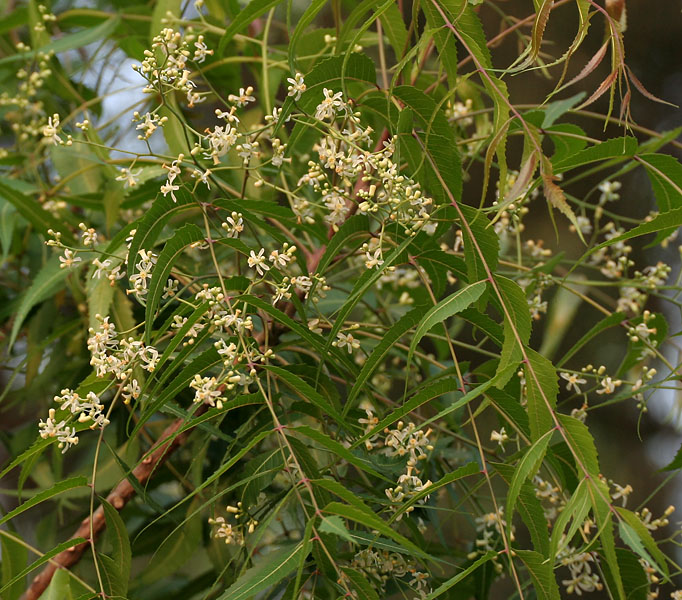
Neem (Azadirachta indica) in Hyderabad, India

Teeth-cleaning twigs can be obtained from a variety of tree species. Although many trees are used in the production of teeth-cleaning twigs, some trees are better suited to clean and protect the teeth, due to the chemical composition of the plant parts. The tree species are:

- Salvadora persica
- Sassafras
- Gumtree
- Garcinia mannii in West Africa
- Orange tree (Citrus × sinensis)
- African laburnum (Cassia sieberiana)
- Tea tree
- Vachellia nilotica, also called babool or kikar in the Indian subcontinent
- Dalbergia sissoo, also called sheesham in the Indian subcontinent
- Liquorice
- Gouania lupuloides
- Cinnamon
- Dogwood
- Acacia catechu
- Acacia nilotica
- and other trees with bitter roots.

Europe and North America

- Apple tree
- Pear tree
- Bamboo
- Fig tree
- Common hazel
- Willow
- Lime tree
- Silver birch
- Olive
- Walnut tree
- Liquorice root
- Nyssa sylvatica

Australia

- Mango
- Mangosteen

India

- Apamarga
- Arjun
- Bael
- Bargad
- Ber
- Dhak
- Gular
- Jamun
- Kamer
- Karanj
- Madar
- Mango
- Mulhatti
- Neem
- Peepal
- Safed babul
- Tejovati
- Vijayasar

== Carrying ==
Many companies produce special cases for carrying, storing and protecting chew sticks, known popularly as "miswak holders".

== Attributes ==
When compared to toothbrushes, teeth-cleaning twigs have several differentiations such as:

- More ecological in its life-cycle.
- Dependence from external supplier, if lack of access to the respective trees.
- Some twigs need moistening with water if they become dry, to ensure the end is soft. The end may be cut afresh to ensure hygiene, and should not be stored near a sink. The twig is replaced every few weeks to maintain proper hygiene.
- Lower cost (0–16% of the cost of a toothbrush).
- Not standardized hardness. Careful selection of the right hardness is required before use.
- Use without toothpaste.
- Cleaning teeth all day long, instead of twice a day for a few minutes.

== See also ==
- Ayurveda
- Babool (brand) of tooth paste in India, made from babool tree
- Miswak
