= Garcinia magnifolia =

Conservation status
- Least Concern (IUCN 3.1)

Scientific classification
- Kingdom: Plantae
- Clade: Embryophytes
- Clade: Tracheophytes
- Clade: Spermatophytes
- Clade: Angiosperms
- Clade: Eudicots
- Clade: Rosids
- Order: Malpighiales
- Family: Clusiaceae
- Genus: Garcinia
- Species: G. magnifolia

Binomial name
- Garcinia magnifolia (Pittier) Hammel ([1912] 1989)

Synonyms
- Rheedia magnifolia Pittier

Species of plant

Garcinia magnifolia, also known as bebasajo or giant leaf madrono, is a flowering tree in the family Clusiaceae (Guttiferae).

The species was first described as Rheedia magnifolia by Henri François Pittier in 1912. In 1989 Barry Edward Hammel placed the species in genus Garcinia as G. magnifolia.

== Range and habitat ==
Garcinia magnifolia is native to Costa Rica, Panama, Colombia, and Ecuador. It grows in lowland tropical rain forest.

== Description ==
The tree rarely exceeds 20 feet (6.1 meters) in height and is dioecious but is capable of self-pollination. It is fairly cold tolerant, with mature trees surviving brief temperatures of 28 °F (−2 °C), and has evergreen leaves which are elliptical in shape. It often begins to produce fruit after 5–7 years of developing, and the fruit arils are edible, which have been described as being sub-acidic to sour in flavor. The flowers develop in clusters on wood that is at least two years old. It is adaptable to many different soils but in neutral, alkaline, or deficient soils it may suffer from iron deficiency. It can grow in full shade, but fruiting may be limited. It does not tolerate salt but does tolerate moderate drought. It is also able to be grown in 15–25 gallon containers.

== Uses ==
The fruit is occasionally eaten and it is planted as an ornamental.

== See also ==
- List of Garcinia species
