= Promise (toothpaste) =

Indian toothpaste brand

- Product type: Dental Products
- Current owner: Dabur
- Introduced: 1978; 48 years ago
- Related brands: Babool and Meswak
- Previous owners: Balsara Hygiene Products Limited
- Website: https://www.daburdentalcare.com/

Promise is a brand of toothpaste that was launched in 1978 by Balsara hygiene in India. Initially, the brand was successful and commanded the second-highest market share after Colgate which was then the market leader. The success of the brand was attributed to the fact that it was positioned as a toothpaste made of clove oil, which is traditionally used in India to treat dental ailments. The brand's tagline was "The unique toothpaste with time-tested clove oil". Its brand ambassador was Maya Alagh. In 1994, the company launched a 2-in-1 gel under the Promise brand, however this product failed because it was aimed at the youth segment which did not relate to Promise's strong clove taste. In 2005, Promise was sold by Balsara to Dabur along with other Balsara toothpaste brands Babool and Meswak in a ₹1.43 billion (US$15 million) deal.

== See also ==
- List of toothpaste brands
- Index of oral health and dental articles
