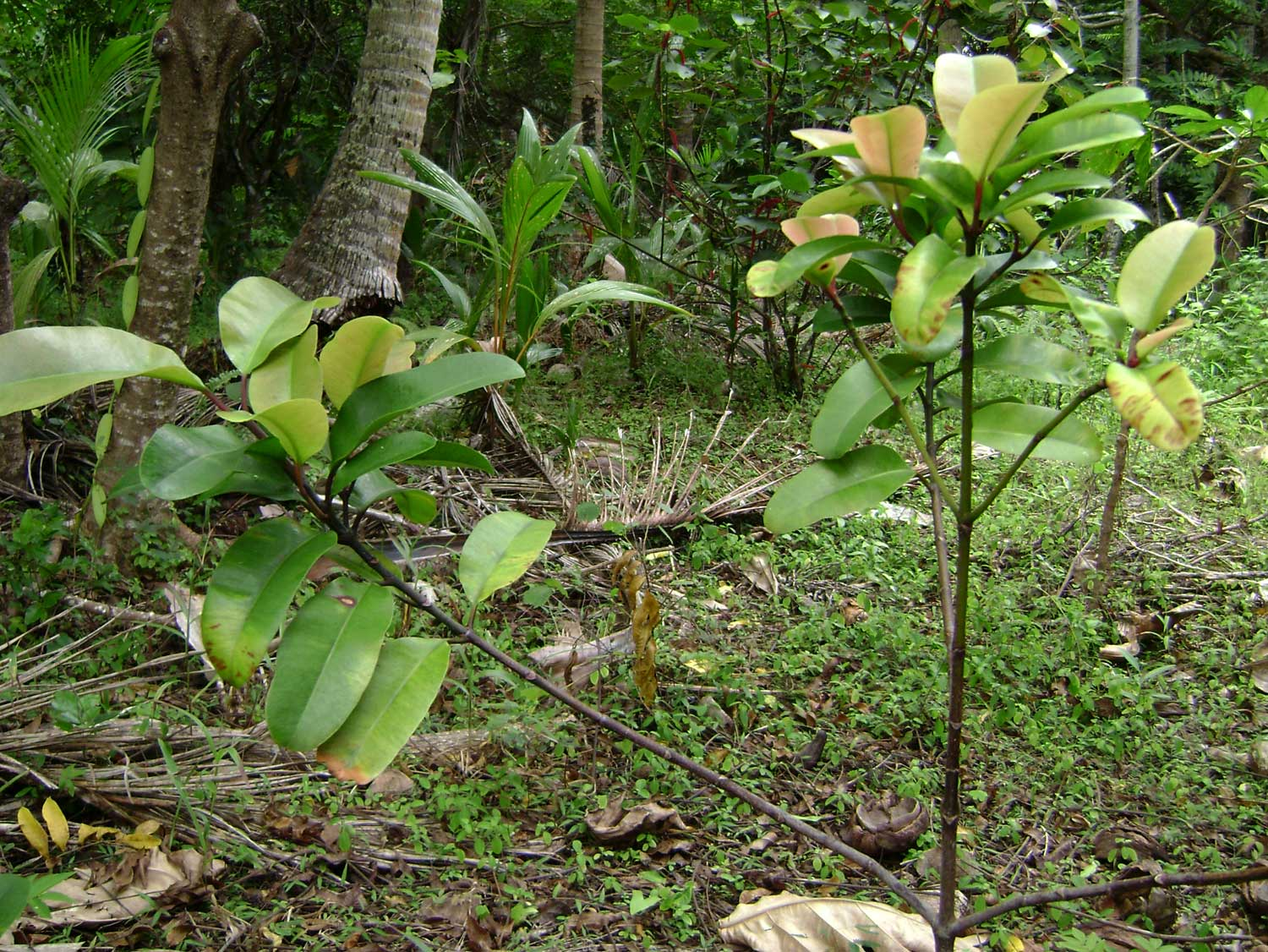
- Young Garcinia pseudoguttifera tree

Conservation status
- Least Concern (IUCN 3.1)

Scientific classification
- Kingdom: Plantae
- Clade: Tracheophytes
- Clade: Angiosperms
- Clade: Eudicots
- Clade: Rosids
- Order: Malpighiales
- Family: Clusiaceae
- Genus: Garcinia
- Species: G. pseudoguttifera

Binomial name
- Garcinia pseudoguttifera Seem. (1865)

= Garcinia pseudoguttifera =

Species of tree

Garcinia pseudoguttifera, known as the mo'onia tree in its native range, is a species of flowering tree in the family Clusiaceae (Guttiferae). The specific epithet (pseudoguttifera) comes from Greek pseudo (= false) and Neo-Latin guttifera (= gum-bearing plant).

== Distribution ==
Garcinia pseudoguttifera is native to Fiji and Vanuatu, and has been introduced to Tonga. It may be present in the Solomon Islands. It grows in dense or thin forests, sometimes in beach thickets, up to 3,772.9 feet (1,150.0 meters) in elevation.

== Description ==
It is a small to medium-sized tree, growing from 13 to 82 feet (4.0 to 25.0 meters) in height. The crown is slender and sometimes spreading. The trunk can measure at least 11.8 inches (30 centimeters) in diameter. It is a dioecious species and has evergreen leaves, which are round and slightly ovate in shape. The fruit of the tree is pink when immature and its arils are edible. The flower bud is green before it blossoms.

== Chemistry ==
Four benzophenones, 6-hydroxy-2,4-dimethoxy-3,5-bis(3-methyl-2-butenyl)benzophenone (myrtiaphenone-A), 2,2-dimethyl-8-benzoyl-7-hydroxy-5-methoxy-6-(3-methyl-2-butenyl)benzopyran (myrtiaphenone-B), 2,6-dihydroxy-4-methoxy-3,5-bis(3-methyl-2-butenyl)benzophenone (vismiaphenone-C), and 2,2-dimethyl-8-benzoyl-3,7-dihydroxy-5-methoxy-6-(3-methyl-2-butenyl)-3,4-dihydrobenzopyran (pseudoguttiaphenone-A), a new compound, were isolated from Garcinia pseudoguttifera. The major component of Garcinia pseudoguttifera is eupha-8,24-dien-3β-ol.

== Uses ==
An extract from the leaves is sometimes used as a pain reliever, and an oil from the fruit is used as a perfume. The wood is sometimes used as timber. The fruit is occasionally eaten.

== See also ==
- List of Garcinia species
