= Garcinia benthamiana =

Conservation status
- Least Concern (IUCN 3.1)

Scientific classification
- Kingdom: Plantae
- Clade: Tracheophytes
- Clade: Angiosperms
- Clade: Eudicots
- Clade: Rosids
- Order: Malpighiales
- Family: Clusiaceae
- Genus: Garcinia
- Species: G. benthamiana

Binomial name
- Garcinia benthamiana (Planch. & Triana) Pipoly ([1860] 2008)

Synonyms
- Rheedia benthamiana Planchon & Triana; Rheedia macrophylla var. benthamiana Vesque

Species of tree

Garcinia benthamiana, also known as asashi, is a flowering tree in the family Clusiaceae (Guttiferae). The specific epithet (benthamiana) honors English botanist George Bentham.

== Distribution ==
Garcinia benthamiana is native to central Brazil, northern Peru, Guyana, Suriname, and French Guiana.

== Description ==
Its petiolate leaves are elliptical to ovate in shape and measure 12–28 centimeters (4.7–11.0 inches) in length and 4.5–11 centimeters (1.8–4.3 inches) in width. The apex can be rounded, acute or acuminate, while the base is rounded to attenuate. It has fasciculate and axillary inflorescences, and the flowers have 15–25 stamens. The fruit has a verrucose epicarp and preeminent rostrum, with a smooth, elliptic seed. Its bark is rough and dark red-brown in color, sometimes covered in a green or white mold. It is a dioecious and evergreen tree.

== Chemistry ==
Four xanthones, α-mangostin, β-mangostin, mangostenol, mangaxanthone B, three benzophenones, mangaphenone, benthamianone, congestiflorone, and one sterol, stigmasterol, were isolated from the stem bark of Garcinia benthamiana. Α-mangostin, β-mangostin, mangaxanthone B and mangaphenone showed significant cytotoxicity through MTT assay against MCF-7 and MDA-MB-231 cells with IC_{50} values ranging from 4.4 to 12 μM. Mangaphenone showed no toxicity toward Vero cells, showing its potential as a lead compound for anti-breast cancer drugs.

== See also ==
- List of Garcinia species
