= Meswak =

Toothpaste brand of Dabur

- Product type: Dental Products
- Current owner: Dabur
- Introduced: 1998; 28 years ago
- Related brands: Babool and Promise
- Previous owners: Balsara Hygiene Products Limited
- Ambassador: Bipasha Basu
- Website: https://www.daburdentalcare.com/meswak/

Meswak (also referred to as Miswak) is a fluoride-free toothpaste brand that was launched in India by Balsara Hygiene in 1998. The toothpaste is marketed as a herbal toothpaste as it is made from extracts of the Salvadora persica plant. The teeth cleaning twig of the plant is reputed to have been used over 7,000 years ago.

== History ==
The brand was relatively unknown until a television advertising campaign during the 1998 Coca-Cola Cup spread brand awareness. In 2005, Meswak was sold by Balsara to Dabur along with other Balsara toothpaste brands Babool and Promise in a ₹1.43 billion (US$15 million) deal. As of 2007, the Meswak brand was valued at ₹200 million (US$2.1 million). In 2011, Dabur announced that Bipasha Basu would be Meswak's brand ambassador.

== See also ==
- List of toothpaste brands
- Index of oral health and dental articles
