= Garcinia forbesii =

Conservation status
- Least Concern (IUCN 3.1)

Scientific classification
- Kingdom: Plantae
- Clade: Tracheophytes
- Clade: Angiosperms
- Clade: Eudicots
- Clade: Rosids
- Order: Malpighiales
- Family: Clusiaceae
- Genus: Garcinia
- Species: G. forbesii

Binomial name
- Garcinia forbesii King (1890)

Species of plant

Garcinia forbesii, commonly known as the rose kandis or kandis, is a small to medium-sized tree in the family Clusiaceae (Guttiferae). The specific epithet (forbesii) honors Scottish naturalist Henry Ogg Forbes.

== Distribution ==
Garcinia forbesii is found in Southeast Asia and is native to Indonesia, Malaysia, Brunei, Papua New Guinea, Singapore, and southern Thailand.

== Description ==
The tree rarely exceeds 20 feet (6.1 meters) in height domestically but has been recorded at heights of nearly 60 feet (18 meters) in the wild and produces a round, smooth, small fruit which is red to white in color and has edible arils, which have been described as being similar to mangosteen in flavor. The trunk is straight and the foliage is dense, often concealing the trunk with branches appearing relatively close to the ground. It is a dioecious species with leathery, elliptically shaped evergreen leaves, and a yellow latex is produced in the inner bark of the tree. The pungent flowers are nocturnal and four-petaled, and in males are crimson in color and occur in clusters while in females are red or orange and occur solitarily. They are insect-pollinated. It grows in forests up to 1,700 meters (5,600 feet) in elevation and is hardy to USDA zone 11.

== Chemistry ==
Several xanthones have been isolated from the branches of Garcinia forbesii: known compounds pyranojacareubin, 1,3,7-trihydroxy-23-methylbut-2-enyl-xanthone and lichexanthone, as well as a new chromenoxanthone, forbexanthone.

== Uses ==
The fruit is sometimes gathered and eaten raw.

== Conservation status ==
In Singapore, the species is listed as critically endangered.

== See also ==
- List of Garcinia species
