= Dabur =

Indian consumer goods company

- Type: Public
- Traded as: BSE: 500096; NSE: DABUR
- ISIN: INE016A01026
- Industry: Consumer goods
- Founded: 1884; 142 years ago in Kolkata, India
- Founder: S. K. Burman
- Headquarters: Ghaziabad, Uttar Pradesh, India
- Area served: Worldwide
- Key people: Mohit Burman (Chairman); Mohit Malhotra (CEO)
- Products: Personal care; Skin care; Hair care; Oral hygiene; Health supplements; Drinks
- Revenue: ▲₹13,113 crore (US$1.4 billion) (2025)
- Operating income: ▼₹2,257 crore (US$230 million) (2025)
- Net income: ▼₹1,740 crore (US$180 million) (2025)
- Total assets: ▲₹16,232 crore (US$1.7 billion) (2025)
- Total equity: ▲₹11,210 crore (US$1.2 billion) (2025)
- Owner: Burman family (66.24%)
- Number of employees: 7,740 (March 2020)
- Subsidiaries: Dabur Research Foundation; H&B Stores Ltd
- Website: www.dabur.com
- Footnotes; Financials as of 31 March 2025.

Dabur India Limited is an Indian multinational consumer goods company, founded in Kolkata in 1884 by S. K. Burman and currently headquartered in Ghaziabad. It manufactures Ayurvedic products and fast-moving consumer goods. Dabur derives around 60% of its revenue from the consumer care business, 11% from the food business and remaining from the international business unit.

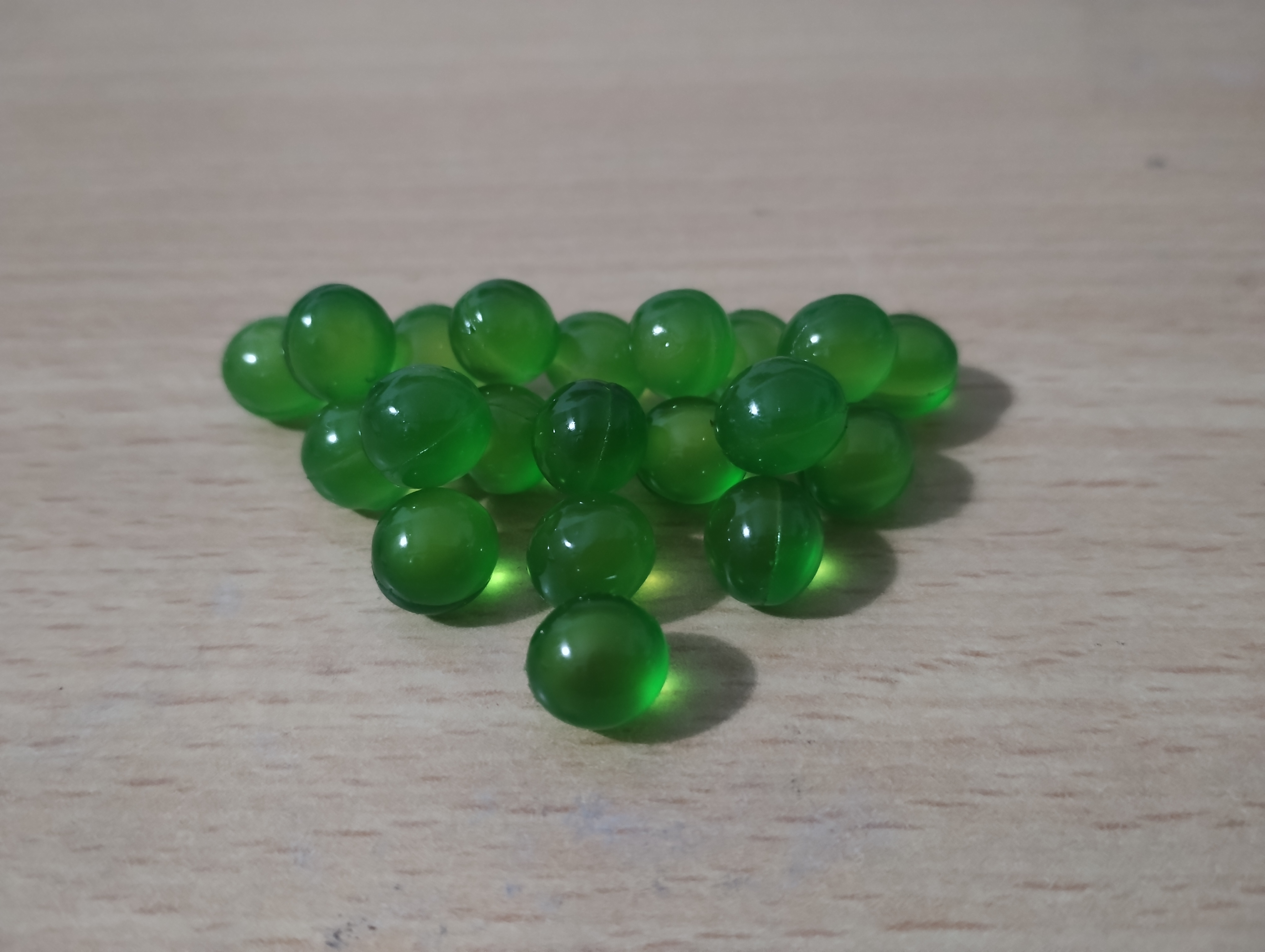
Dabur Pudin Hara tablets

== History ==
Dabur was founded in Kolkata by Ayurvedic practitioner S. K. Burman in 1884. In the mid-1880s, he formulated Ayurvedic medicines for diseases like cholera, constipation and malaria. As a qualified physician, he went on to sell his medicines in Bengal on a bicycle. His patients started referring him and his medicines as "Dabur", a portmanteau of the words daktar (doctor) and Burman. He later went on to mass-produce his Ayurvedic formulations.

C.L. Burman, set up Dabur's first R&D unit. Later, his grandson, G.C Burman was gherao-ed by his own workers during a labour unrest in Kolkata. Due to the unpleasant situation, G.C Burman decided to move the factory to Delhi, where his brothers later relocated. In Delhi, the business thrived and the company soon became headquartered there. In the words of business historian Sonu Bhasin "Calcutta's loss was Delhi's gain."

In 1997, Dabur set up a wholly owned consumer goods subsidiary called Dabur Foods under which it launched its fruit juice brand called Real.

In 1998, Dabur separated ownership from management, when they handed over the management of the company to professionals.

Dabur demerged its pharma business in 2003 and hived it off into a separate company, Dabur Pharma. German company Fresenius bought a 73% stake in Dabur Pharma for ₹872 crore (US$200.44 million) in 2008.

In 2005, Dabur acquired three Balsara group companies, gaining control of brands such as Babool, Promise, Meswak, Odonil, Odomos, Odopic, and Sani Fresh.

In 2009, Dabur completed the acquisition of a majority stake in female skincare products company Fem Care Pharma for ₹270 crore (US$55.78 million) and later merged the company into itself.

In 2022, Dabur acquired a 51% stake in the Indian spices company Badshah Masala for ₹588 crore.

In November 2024, Dabur acquired a 51% stake in Sesa Care, an Indian haircare company for an enterprise value of ₹315-325 crore.

== Philanthropy ==
Dabur's Sustainable Development Society (Sundesh) is a non-profit organisation started by Burman that aims to carry out welfare activities in the spheres of health care, education and other socio economic activities. Dabur drives its corporate social responsibility (CSR) initiatives through Sundesh.

The 2015 Brand Trust Report puts Dabur at 19th place.

== Controversies ==
Former executive director Pradip Burman was on the list of black money account holders on 27 October 2014 when the government published the list. Dabur rejected the black money charge.

In December 2020, a report by the Centre for Science and Environment showed that Dabur Honey, along with other major brands' products, was adulterated with sugar syrup.

Hajmola or Hazmola (transl. Digestion, from hazma/hajma) is an ayurvedic digestive tablet sold as a treatment for indigestion by Dabur under that name since the 1950s. A counterfeit of the product was trademarked by "Hilal Foods (Pvt.) Limited" (estb. 1986), a Karachi based company in Pakistan, which had been selling it since at least the 1980s. When Dabur began operating in Pakistan, Hilal filed an intellectual property infringement suit against Dabur which was ultimately settled by the Sindh High Court allowing both Hilal and Dabur to use the Hajmola trademark.

In May 2025, the FSSAI informed the Delhi High Court that Dabur's '100% fruit juice' claim on its product is misleading, as the juices contain water and fruit concentrates.

== See also ==
- Chyavanprash
- Shilajit
