= Garcinia jensenii =

Conservation status
- Least Concern (NCA)

Scientific classification
- Kingdom: Plantae
- Clade: Tracheophytes
- Clade: Angiosperms
- Clade: Eudicots
- Clade: Rosids
- Order: Malpighiales
- Family: Clusiaceae
- Genus: Garcinia
- Species: G. jensenii

Binomial name
- Garcinia jensenii W.E.Cooper

Species of flowering plant

Garcinia jensenii is a species of plant in the family Clusiaceae, first described in 2013 by Australian botanist Wendy Elizabeth Cooper. It is native to Cape York Peninsula and islands of the Torres Strait, Queensland, Australia. It inhabits well-developed rainforest and gallery forest at attitudes up to 500 m (1,600 ft).
