= Garcinia leggeae =

Conservation status
- Least Concern (NCA)

Scientific classification
- Kingdom: Plantae
- Clade: Embryophytes
- Clade: Tracheophytes
- Clade: Spermatophytes
- Clade: Angiosperms
- Clade: Eudicots
- Clade: Rosids
- Order: Malpighiales
- Family: Clusiaceae
- Genus: Garcinia
- Species: G. leggeae

Binomial name
- Garcinia leggeae W.E.Cooper

Species of flowering plant

Garcinia leggeae is a species of plant in the family Clusiaceae, first described in 2013 by Australian botanist Wendy Elizabeth Cooper. It is native to Cape York Peninsula, Queensland, Australia. It inhabits well-developed rainforest on the floodplains of Claudie and Gordon Creeks, at attitudes up to 75 m (246 ft).
