= Garcinia mungotia =

Scientific classification
- Kingdom: Plantae
- Clade: Tracheophytes
- Clade: Angiosperms
- Clade: Eudicots
- Clade: Rosids
- Order: Malpighiales
- Family: Clusiaceae
- Genus: Garcinia
- Species: G. mungotia

Binomial name
- Garcinia mungotia Planch. ex Pierre

Synonyms
- Clusianthemum coriaceum Vieill.; Clusianthemum pedicellatum Vieill.

Species of flowering plant

Garcinia mungotia is a species of flowering plant in the family Clusiaceae. It is a tree endemic to New Caledonia.
