= Garcinia zichii =

Conservation status
- Least Concern (NCA)

Scientific classification
- Kingdom: Plantae
- Clade: Tracheophytes
- Clade: Angiosperms
- Clade: Eudicots
- Clade: Rosids
- Order: Malpighiales
- Family: Clusiaceae
- Genus: Garcinia
- Species: G. zichii

Binomial name
- Garcinia zichii W.E.Cooper

Species of flowering plant

Garcinia zichii is a species of plant in the family Clusiaceae, first described in 2013 by Australian botanist Wendy Elizabeth Cooper. It is native to the Wet Tropics bioregion of Queensland, Australia, and inhabits well-developed rainforest at attitudes between 150 and 1,300 m (490 and 4,270 ft).
