= Garcinia ulugurensis =

Conservation status
- Vulnerable (IUCN 3.1)

Scientific classification
- Kingdom: Plantae
- Clade: Embryophytes
- Clade: Tracheophytes
- Clade: Angiosperms
- Clade: Eudicots
- Clade: Rosids
- Order: Malpighiales
- Family: Clusiaceae
- Genus: Garcinia
- Species: G. ulugurensis

Binomial name
- Garcinia ulugurensis (Engl.) P.W.Sweeney

Synonyms
- Allanblackia ulugurensis Engl.

Species of flowering plant

Garcinia ulugurensis is a species of flowering plant in the family Clusiaceae. It is a tree found only in Tanzania. It is known from the Udzungwa Mountains, Nguru Mountains, and Uluguru Mountains, where it grows in montane rain forest from 1,000 to 2,280 metres elevation.

Its seeds produce an edible oil, which can be extracted by pounding, boiling, and skimming off the fat.
