= Garcinia buchananii =

Scientific classification
- Kingdom: Plantae
- Clade: Embryophytes
- Clade: Tracheophytes
- Clade: Angiosperms
- Clade: Eudicots
- Clade: Rosids
- Order: Malpighiales
- Family: Clusiaceae
- Genus: Garcinia
- Species: G. buchananii

Binomial name
- Garcinia buchananii Baker

Species of plant

Garcinia buchananii is a species of shrub or tree in the family of Clusiaceae with a native range from southern Ethiopia to southern tropical Africa. Its bark has traditionally been extracted for various applications in African folk medicines including diarrhea, dysentery, and abdominal pain and its fruit is edible and is often consumed locally.
