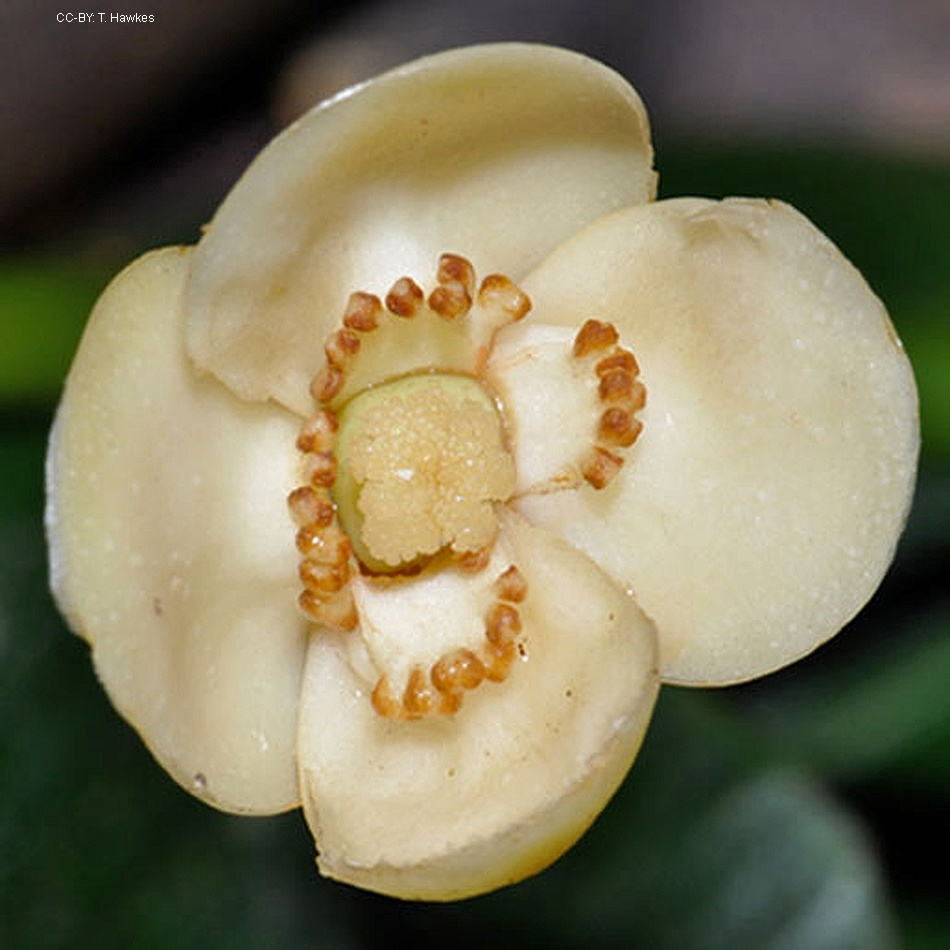
- Female flower

Conservation status
- Critically Endangered (NCA)

Scientific classification
- Kingdom: Plantae
- Clade: Tracheophytes
- Clade: Angiosperms
- Clade: Eudicots
- Clade: Rosids
- Order: Malpighiales
- Family: Clusiaceae
- Genus: Garcinia
- Species: G. russellii

Binomial name
- Garcinia russellii W.E.Cooper

= Garcinia russellii =

Species of flowering plant

Garcinia russellii, also known as Rupert's mangosteen, is a species of plant in the family Clusiaceae, first described in 2013 by Australian botanist Wendy Elizabeth Cooper. It is native to the Wet Tropics bioregion of Queensland, Australia, and has been give the conservation status of critically endangered.
