= Babool (brand) =

Indian toothpaste brand

- Product type: Dental Products
- Current owner: Dabur
- Introduced: 1987; 39 years ago
- Related brands: Promise and Meswak
- Previous owners: Balsara Hygiene Products Limited
- Website: https://www.daburdentalcare.com/

Babool is a toothpaste brand which was launched in India by Balsara Hygiene in 1987. Babool is made from the bark of the Babool tree, which has traditionally been used to clean teeth in India. The brand was positioned as an economic toothpaste with the tagline "Babool Babool paisa vasool". Babool was relaunched with the tagline "Begin a great day, the Babool way" in 2002, when Babool was Balsara's biggest brand. In 2005, Babool was sold by Balsara to Dabur along with other Balsara toothpaste brands Promise and Meswak in a ₹1.43 billion (US$15 million) deal. As of 2007, the Babool brand was valued at ₹1 billion (US$11 million).

== See also ==
- List of toothpaste brands
- Index of oral health and dental articles
