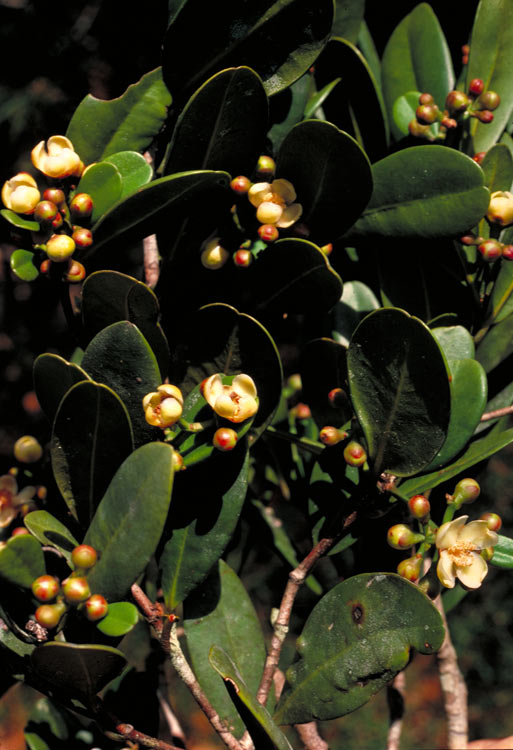
- Flowering shrub

Conservation status
- Least Concern (IUCN 3.1)

Scientific classification
- Kingdom: Plantae
- Clade: Embryophytes
- Clade: Tracheophytes
- Clade: Spermatophytes
- Clade: Angiosperms
- Clade: Eudicots
- Clade: Rosids
- Order: Malpighiales
- Family: Clusiaceae
- Genus: Garcinia
- Species: G. brassii

Binomial name
- Garcinia brassii C.T.White

= Garcinia brassii =

Species of flowering plant

Garcinia brassii is a species of plant in the family Clusiaceae, first described in 1935. It is endemic to the Wet Tropics bioregion of Queensland, Australia.

== Description ==
Garcinia brassii is a small tree growing to about 18 m (59 ft) tall. The leaves are glossy green above, paler below, and very stiff. They are obovate (broadest towards the apex) to elliptic in shape and can grow to about 13 cm (5.1 in) long. The leaves and twigs exude yellow sap when broken or cut.

The flowers are about 25 mm (1 in) in diameter and have four sepals and four petals. This species is dioecious, meaning that male and female flowers are borne on separate plants.

The fruit is, in botanical terms, an almost spherical berry, measuring about 50 mm (2 in) wide and dark red in colour. It contains up to four seeds.

== Taxonomy ==
It was first described in 1935 (published 1936) by botanist Cyril Tenison White. The type specimen was collected at the summit of Thornton Peak.

=== Etymology ===
The species epithet brassii is in recognition of the type collector, L.J. Brass.

== Distribution and habitat ==
Garcinia brassii is restricted to mountain areas from near Cape Tribulation to the Mount Lewis National Park. It grows in rainforest at altitudes between 500 and 1,500 m (1,600 and 4,900 ft).

== Conservation ==
As of June 2026, this species has been assessed to be of least concern by the International Union for Conservation of Nature (IUCN) and by the Queensland Government under its Nature Conservation Act.

== Gallery ==
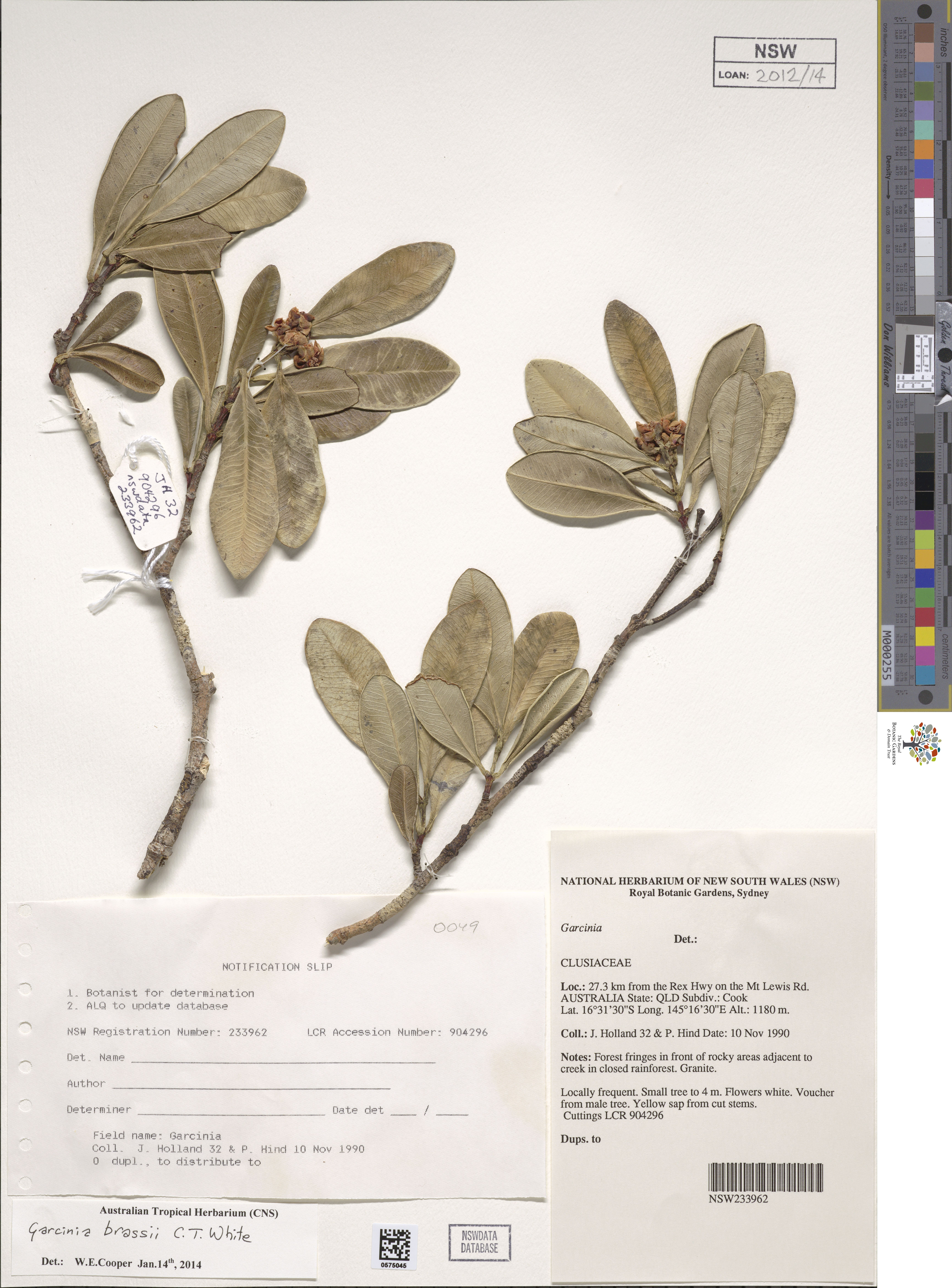
Herbarium specimen

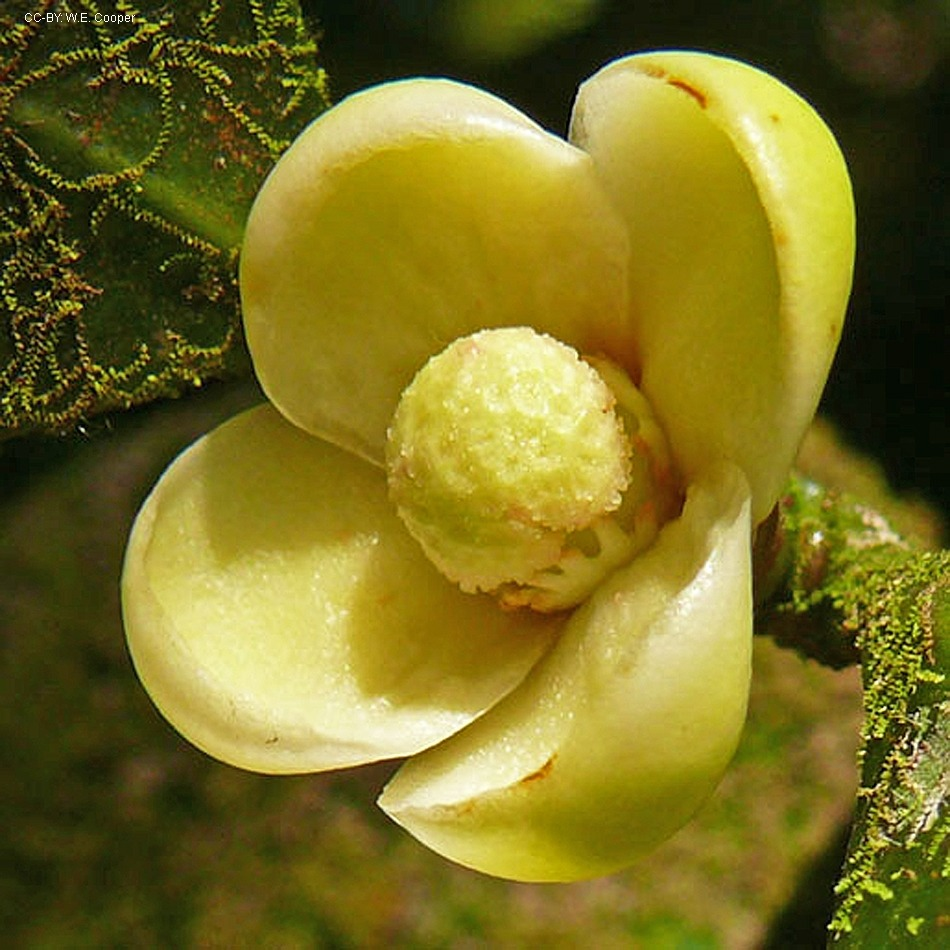
Female flower

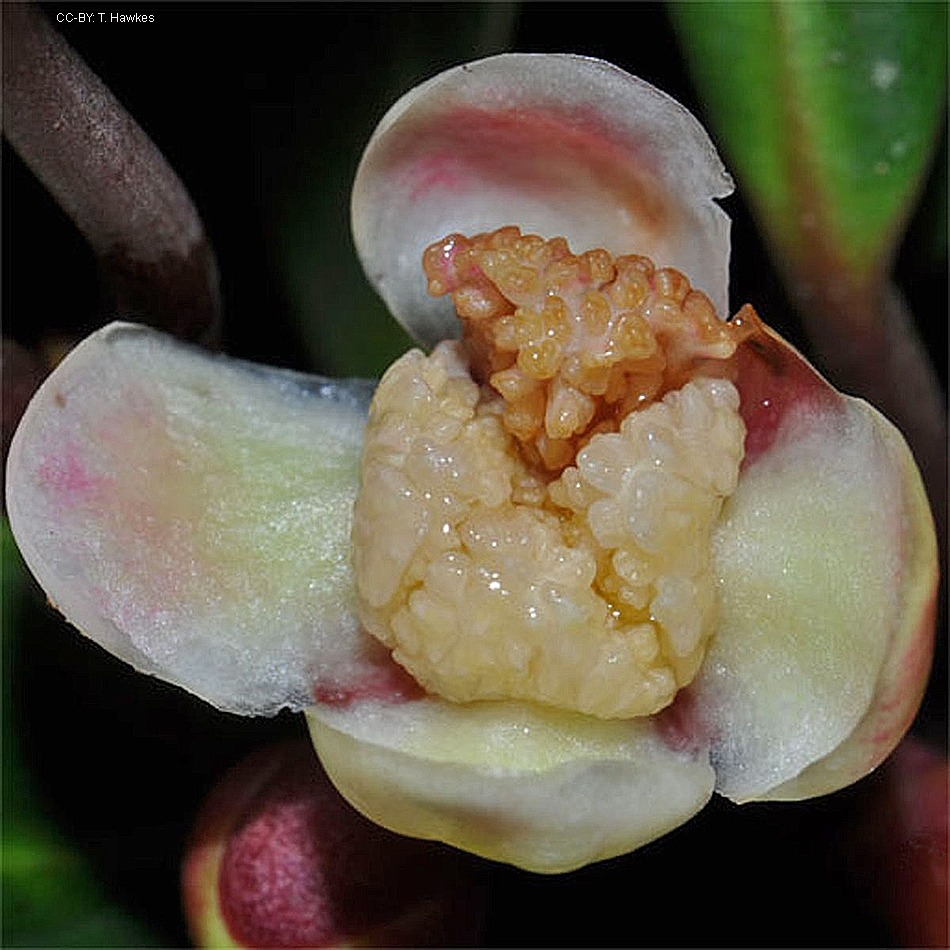
Male flower
