= Garcinia oleosperma =

Conservation status
- Least Concern (IUCN 3.1)

Scientific classification
- Kingdom: Plantae
- Clade: Embryophytes
- Clade: Tracheophytes
- Clade: Angiosperms
- Clade: Eudicots
- Clade: Rosids
- Order: Malpighiales
- Family: Clusiaceae
- Genus: Garcinia
- Species: G. oleosperma

Binomial name
- Garcinia oleosperma P.W.Sweeney

Synonyms
- Allanblackia floribunda Oliv.; Allanblackia klainei Pierre ex A.Chev.

Species of flowering plant

Garcinia oleosperma, known in English as tallow tree, is a species of flowering plant in the family Clusiaceae. It is native to tropical Africa, ranging from Benin through Nigeria, Cameroon, Equatorial Guinea, Gabon, and Republic of the Congo to Central African Republic and Democratic Republic of the Congo. It has been long used in traditional African medicine to treat hypertension. It is a common understory tree in rainforests in western central Africa - from Sierra Leone to western Cameroon, and on into the Democratic Republic of Congo and Uganda. The medium-sized tree (up to 30 meters tall) is evergreen and dioecious (male and female flowers on different plants). The wood is said to be resistant to termites but is not particularly durable. It is fairly easy to work and finishes well but it is of little commercial importance though it has appeared on the market in Liberia as "lacewood".

The species was first described as Allanblackia floribunda by Daniel Oliver in 1867. The genus Allanblackia has been combined into genus Garcinia, and in 2024 Patrick W. Sweeney renamed the species Garcinia oleosperma, since the name Garcinia floribunda was already in use.

== Uses ==
The wood is used in Nigeria in hut-building for making walls, doors, and window frames, and in Liberia for planks. In Ghana, small trees are cut for poles and used as mine pit props and bridge piles. The twigs are used in Ghana as candlesticks, and the smaller ones as chew-sticks and tooth-picks in Ghana and Gabon. The inner bark contains a sticky yellow resin. The bark has anodyne properties. In the Region, it is pounded and rubbed on the body to relieve painful conditions. In Gabon, a decoction is taken for dysentery and as a mouthwash for toothache, and in Congo (Brazzaville) for stomach pains. In Congo, a decoction of the bark or the leaves is taken for cough, asthma, bronchitis, and other bronchial affections while the lees from this preparation are rubbed over areas of pain after scarification.

The tree's fruit is not edible but its seeds are the source of Allanblackia Oil long used by local populations. Nigeria is developing infrastructure for international-scale commercial use. It is estimated Nigeria produced about 50 tons of Allan Lacki oil in 2006. Domesticating Garcinia oleosperma is being attempted. Presently the seed is collected only from wild stands or from trees retained on farmland (When clearing land for cultivation trees are left and managed, especially for shading cocoa).
