= Garcinia acuminata =

Conservation status
- Least Concern (IUCN 3.1)

Scientific classification
- Kingdom: Plantae
- Clade: Tracheophytes
- Clade: Angiosperms
- Clade: Eudicots
- Clade: Rosids
- Order: Malpighiales
- Family: Clusiaceae
- Genus: Garcinia
- Species: G. acuminata

Binomial name
- Garcinia acuminata Planch. & Triana

Synonyms
- Garcinia elliptica (Graham) Wall. ex Wight; Hebradendron ellipticum Graham; Garcinia wallichiana Klotzsch ex Planch. & Triana

Species of flowering plant

Garcinia acuminata is a species of plants in the family Clusiaceae. It is native to Assam, Bangladesh, East Himalaya and Thailand.
