= Garcinia agnoume =

Conservation status
- Vulnerable (IUCN 3.1)

Scientific classification
- Kingdom: Plantae
- Clade: Embryophytes
- Clade: Tracheophytes
- Clade: Angiosperms
- Clade: Eudicots
- Clade: Rosids
- Order: Malpighiales
- Family: Clusiaceae
- Genus: Garcinia
- Species: G. agnoume

Binomial name
- Garcinia agnoume P.W.Sweeney

Synonyms
- Allanblackia floribunda var. gabonensis Pellegr.; Allanblackia gabonensis (Pellegr.) Bamps; Allanblackia monticola Mildbr. ex Staner; Garcinia ngouniensis P.W.Sweeney

Species of flowering plant

Garcinia agnoume is a species of flowering plant in the family Clusiaceae. It is a tree native to Cameroon, Gabon, and the Gulf of Guinea Islands. Its natural habitat is tropical moist lowland forest. It is threatened by habitat loss.

The species was first described as Allanblackia floribunda var. gabonensis by François Pellegrin in 1959. The genus Allanblackia has been combined into genus Garcinia. In 2024 Patrick Wayne Sweeney renamed the species Garcinia agnoume, since the name Garcinia gabonensis had previously been given to another species.
