= Lemon drop mangosteen =

The vernacular name lemon drop mangosteen is applied to two species of tropical American fruit trees.

- Garcinia intermedia
- Garcinia madruno
