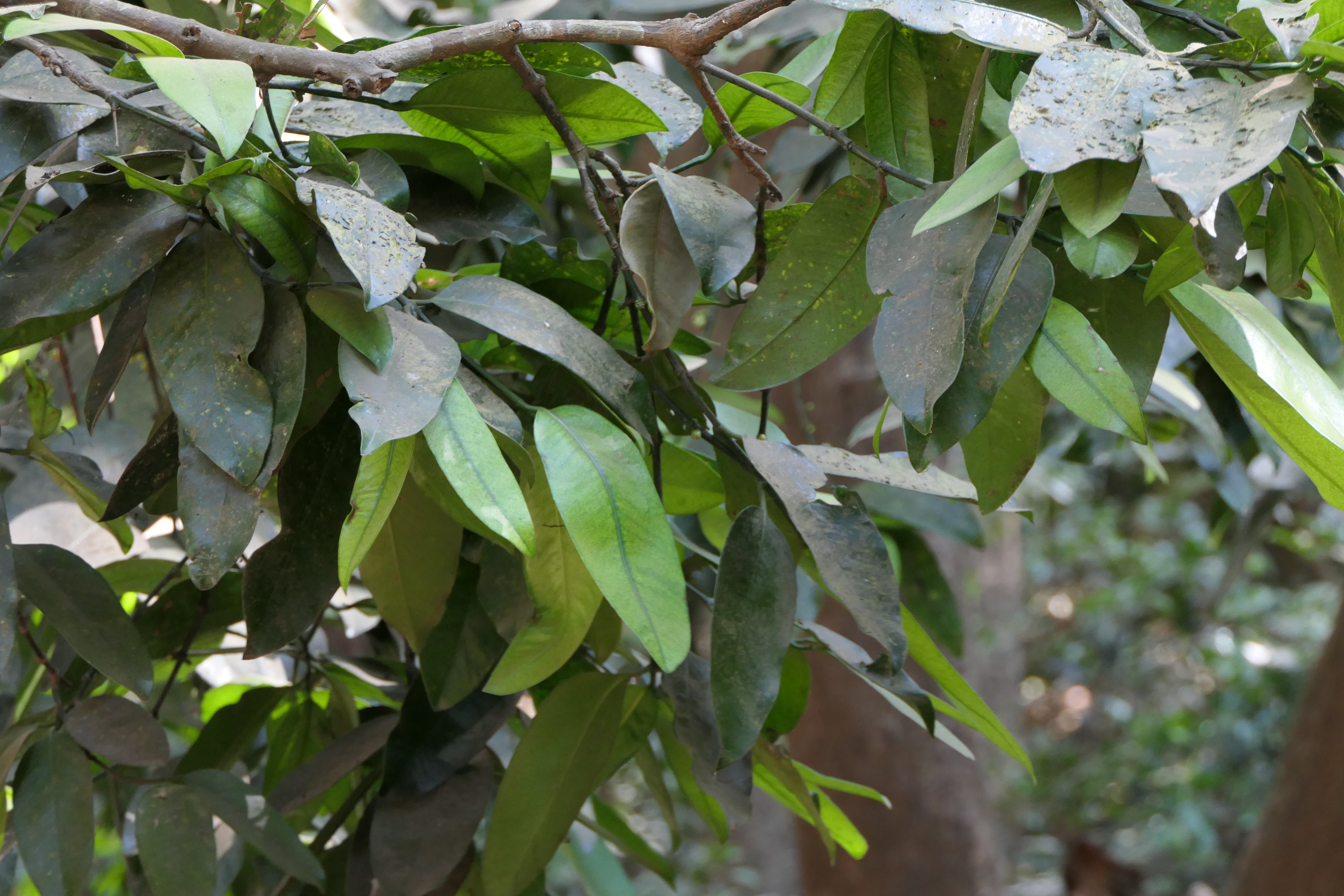

Conservation status
- Least Concern (IUCN 3.1)

Scientific classification
- Kingdom: Plantae
- Clade: Tracheophytes
- Clade: Angiosperms
- Clade: Eudicots
- Clade: Rosids
- Order: Malpighiales
- Family: Clusiaceae
- Genus: Garcinia
- Species: G. talbotii

Binomial name
- Garcinia talbotii Raizada ex Santapau

Synonyms
- Garcinia malabarica Talbot, nom. illeg. homonym. post.; Garcinia ovalifolius var. macrantha Hook.f. ex T.Anderson

= Garcinia talbotii =

Species of tree

Garcinia talbotii is a large tree in the family Clusiaceae and is endemic to the Western Ghats of India. The tree has yellow latex, and can attain a height of 25 m and girth up to 2.2 m. This species was first reported from Gairsoppah Ghats in North Kanara of Karanataka district.

== Description ==
The leaves of this tree are simple and opposite. The petiole length is about 0.5-2 cm and lamina size range is 7-15 × 3-7 cm. The leaf shape can be considered as elliptic or ovate. Twelve to fifteen pairs of parallel secondary nerves can be seen on the leaves. Flowers are yellow, dioecious, and seen in axillary clusters. Fruits are globose, smooth, and 5 cm in diameter.

== Distribution ==
This is a common sub-canopy tree seen throughout the low and medium elevation evergreen forests. It's found at elevations of 250-1100 m. In India, it is distributed across Goa, Karnataka, Kerala and Maharashtra districts

== Reproduction ==
This is a dioecious tree with separate male and female plants. The flowering and fruiting of this tree occurs between January and June. Pollination is entomophilous, or cleistogamy, or allogamy.

== Uses ==
The fruits of this species are edible and are used in curries. It also yields an inferior quality yellow gum that is used in folk medicine.
