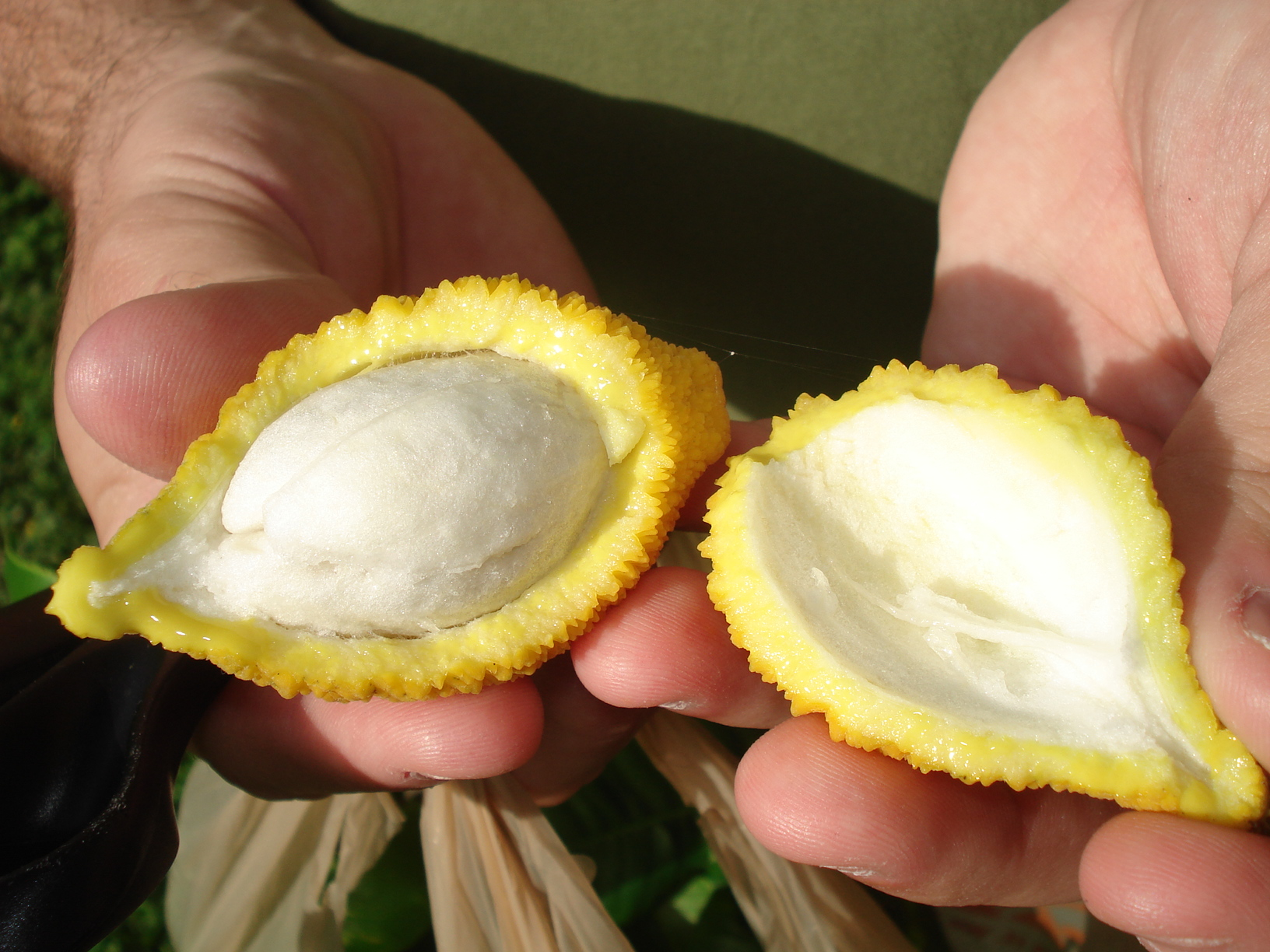

Conservation status
- Least Concern (IUCN 3.1)

Scientific classification
- Kingdom: Plantae
- Clade: Tracheophytes
- Clade: Angiosperms
- Clade: Eudicots
- Clade: Rosids
- Order: Malpighiales
- Family: Clusiaceae
- Genus: Garcinia
- Species: G. madruno

Binomial name
- Garcinia madruno (Kunth) Hammel

Synonyms
- Calophyllum madruno Kunth (1822); Chloromyron verticillatum Pers.; Rheedia acuminata (Ruiz & Pav.) Planch. & Triana; Rheedia acuminata var. floribunda Vesque; Rheedia floribunda Planch. & Triana; Rheedia kappleri Eyma; Rheedia madruno (Kunth) Planch. & Triana; Rheedia madruno subsp. bituberculata Pittier; Rheedia madruno subsp. ovata Pittier; Rheedia rostrata Vesque; Verticillaria acuminata Ruiz & Pav.; Verticillaria madruno (Kunth) Tul. ex Vesque; Verticillaria peruviana G.Don; Verticillaria rostrata Miers ex Engl.

= Garcinia madruno =

Species of tree

Garcinia madruno, the charichuela, is a fruit-producing tree species from the lowland and montane rainforests of Central and South America. It ranges from Honduras to Trinidad, Paraguay, and northeastern Brazil. The leaves are dark green and leathery. The fruit looks like a shriveled droopy lemon and has a similar rind, so is sometimes called a lemon drop mangosteen. The interior is soft white pulp and has a popular, slightly citrusy taste people have compared to a sweet santol fruit or lemony cotton candy.

The species was first described as Calophyllum madruno by Carl Sigismund Kunth in 1822. In 1989 Barry Edward Hammel placed the species in genus Garcinia as G. madruno. The species was formerly included in the genus Rheedia, which has since been absorbed into Garcinia, as Rheedia species are now known as "new world mangosteens".

== Cultivation ==
Garcinia madruno is well adapted to a wide variety of soils, tolerating even poor soils or heavy clay. It is a slow grower and takes about 5 to 7 years to fruit. When young, it must be protected from frosts and it will not fruit in cold areas.

== Distribution ==
The fruit is not very well known outside of South America and a few backyard growers in South Florida.
