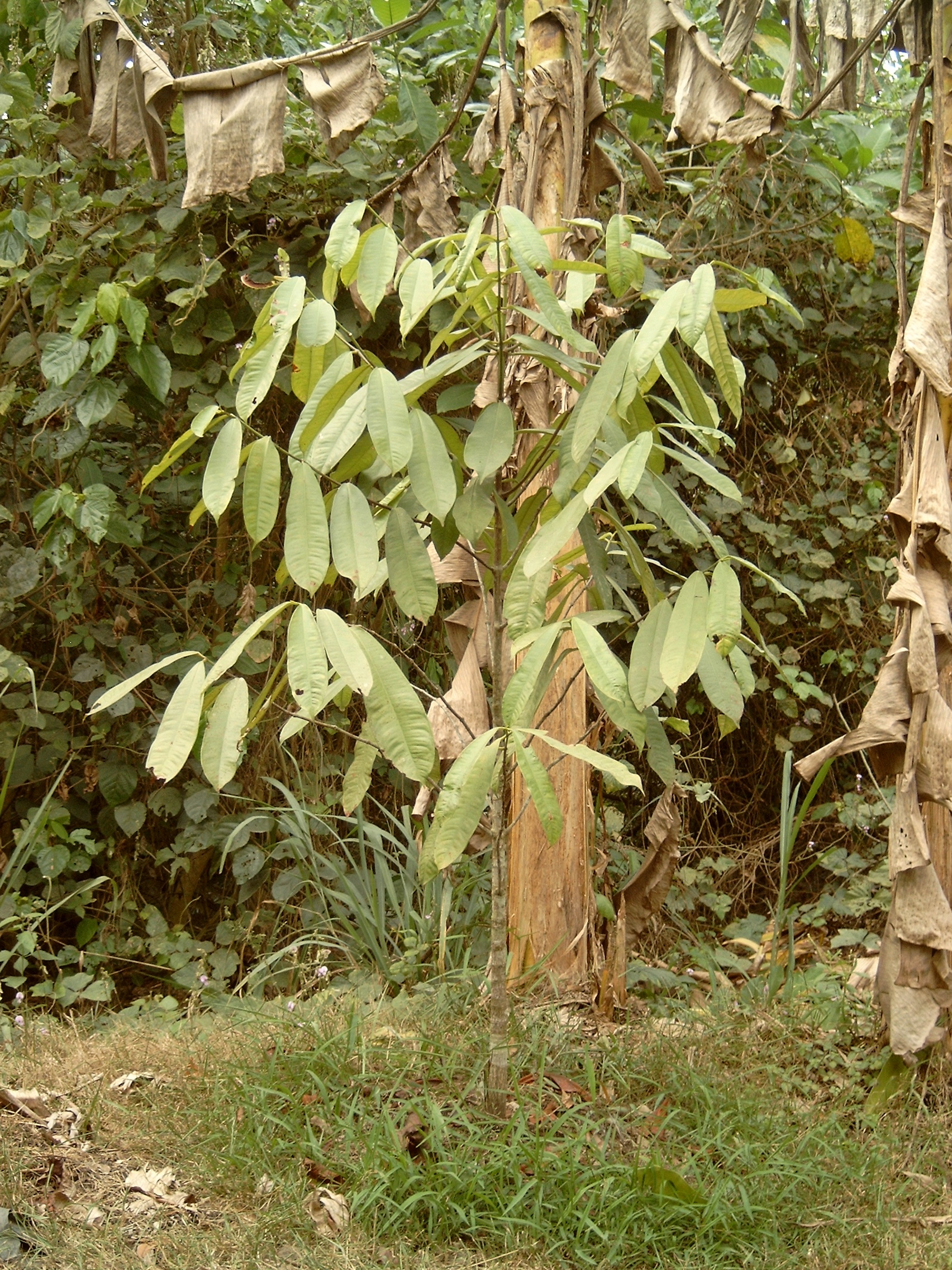

Scientific classification
- Kingdom: Plantae
- Clade: Embryophytes
- Clade: Tracheophytes
- Clade: Angiosperms
- Clade: Eudicots
- Clade: Rosids
- Order: Malpighiales
- Family: Clusiaceae
- Genus: Garcinia
- Species: G. alepensis

Binomial name
- Garcinia alepensis P.W.Sweeney

Synonyms
- Allanblackia parviflora A.Chev.; Allanblackia parviflora Gaudeul & Sweeney & Munzinger, 2024; Garcinia guineensis P.W.Sweeney

= Garcinia alepensis =

Species of flowering plant

Garcinia alepensis is a deciduous shrub or forest tree belonging to the family Clusiaceae.

== Description ==
The tree is capable of growing up to 30 m (100 ft) in height and with a diameter that can occasionally reach 80 cm (31 in). The trunk is cylindrical while the bark is reddish to brown and sometimes scaly; the crown is narrow with glossy large leaves. Leaflets are elliptical in shape up to 25 cm (10 in) long and 9 cm (3.5 in) wide. Flowers are fragrant and are pink, reddish or creamy. Fruit is a large ellipsoid berry, up to 50 cm (20 in) long and 15 cm (6 in) wide with brown warts.

== Distribution ==
The species is native to Tropical West Africa and occurs from Guinea eastwards to Ghana. It is commonly found along slopes in evergreen rain forests along the coast of West Africa and can also be found in moist semi-deciduous forests.

== Chemistry ==
Studies conducted on seed extracts of the plant indicate a high fatty oil yield, with oleic and stearic acids the dominant fatty acid contents of the seeds.

== Uses ==
In Liberia its wood is used in carpentry work and in other parts of West Africa it is considered suitable as a shade tree in cocoa farms. In traditional medicine, stem bark extracts is used in pain management.

Oil obtained from the seed is also used for cooking.
