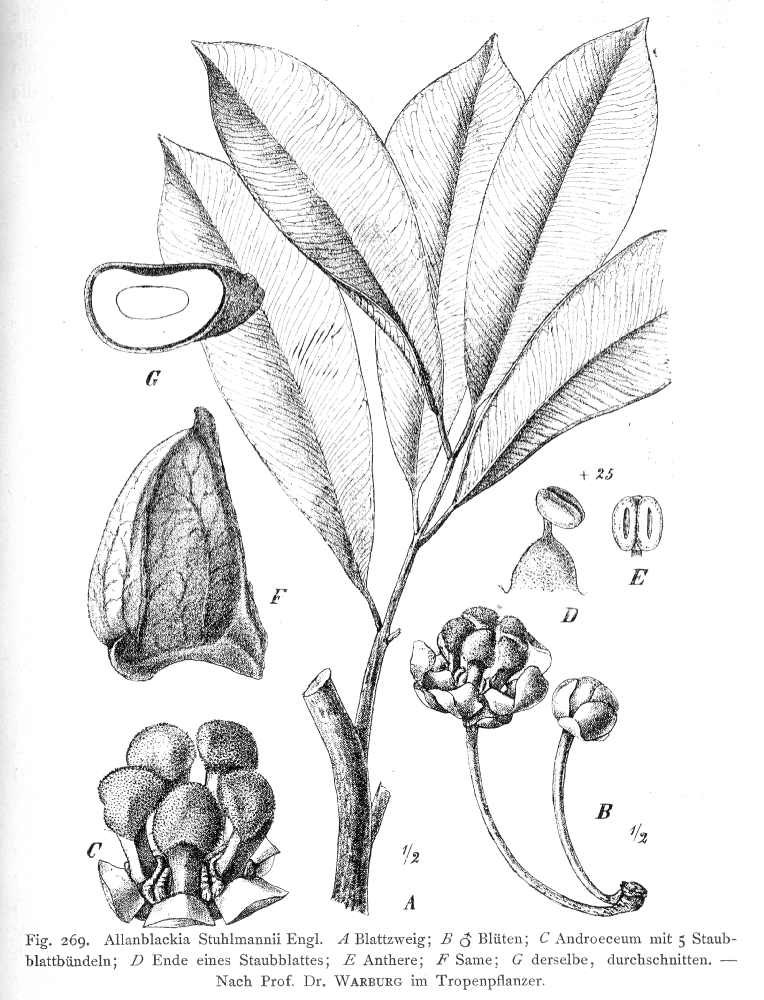
- From Vegetation der Erde (1910)

Conservation status
- Least Concern (IUCN 3.1)

Scientific classification
- Kingdom: Plantae
- Clade: Embryophytes
- Clade: Tracheophytes
- Clade: Angiosperms
- Clade: Eudicots
- Clade: Rosids
- Order: Malpighiales
- Family: Clusiaceae
- Genus: Garcinia
- Species: G. stuhlmannii

Binomial name
- Garcinia stuhlmannii (Engl.) P.W.Sweeney

Synonyms
- Allanblackia sacleuxii Hua; Allanblackia stuhlmannii (Engl.) Engl.; Stearodendron stuhlmannii Engl.

= Garcinia stuhlmannii =

Species of flowering plant

Garcinia stuhlmannii is a species of flowering plant in the family Clusiaceae. It is a tree endemic to Tanzania.

It is native to the East and West Usambara Mountains, Uluguru Mountains, Udzungwa Mountains (including the Kihansi Gorge), and Pemba Island. It grows in submontane and montane forests.

== Commercial use ==
The tree's seeds are a source of edible oil long used by local populations and at one time exported as a government run business . An infrastructure is being developed for international scale commercial use . It is hoped that by commercializing non-timber forest products and increasing the value of forests for local people this will result in their help in conserving this natural resource .
