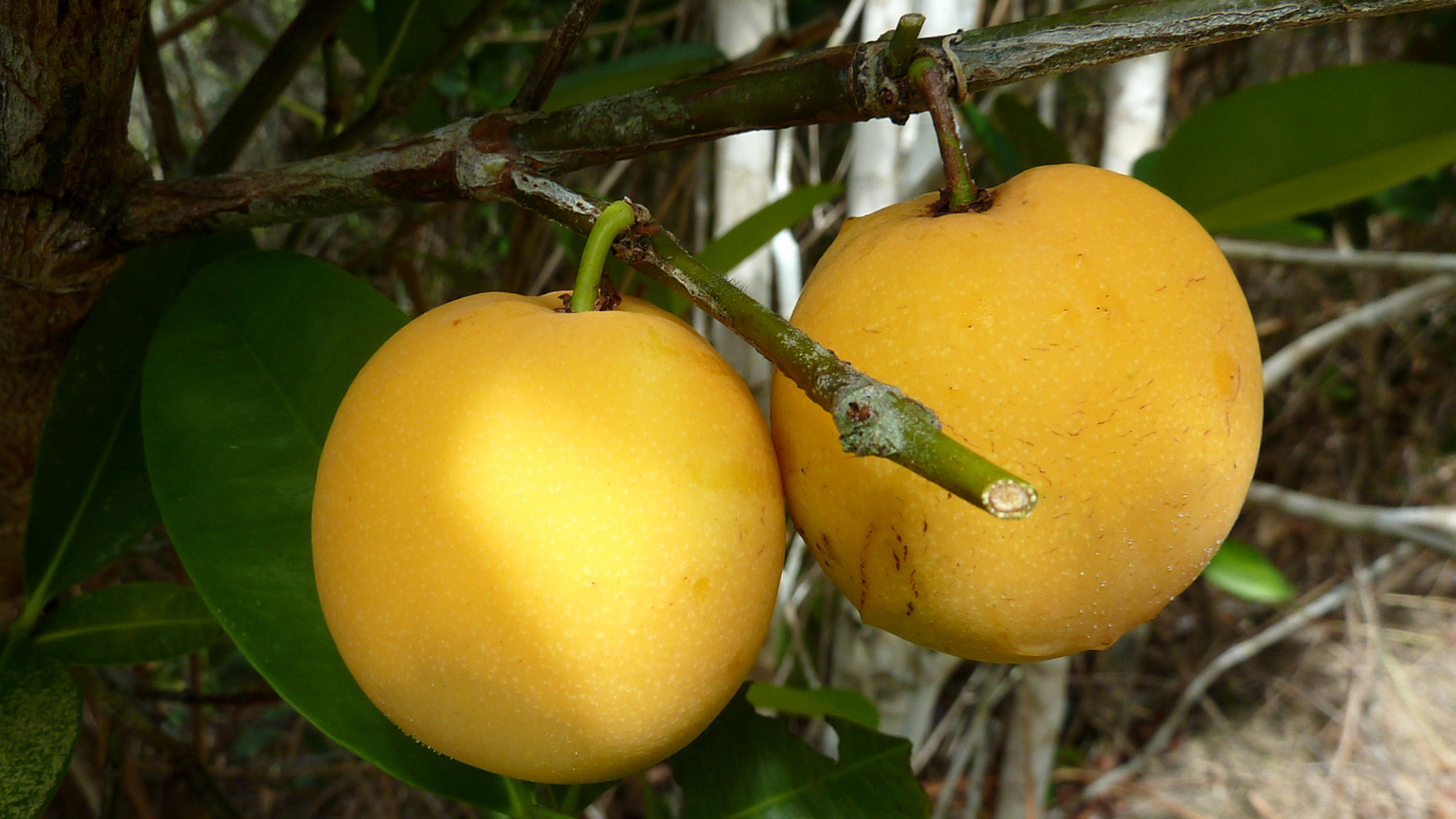

Conservation status
- Least Concern (IUCN 3.1)

Scientific classification
- Kingdom: Plantae
- Clade: Tracheophytes
- Clade: Angiosperms
- Clade: Eudicots
- Clade: Rosids
- Order: Malpighiales
- Family: Clusiaceae
- Genus: Garcinia
- Species: G. gardneriana

Binomial name
- Garcinia gardneriana (Planch. & Triana) Zappi

Synonyms
- Lamprophyllum gardnerianum Triana & Planch.; Marialva calyptrata (Schltdl.) Steud.; Platorheedia arborea Rojas; Platorheedia pacuri Rojas; Rheedia arubayensis Coimbra; Rheedia calyptrata (Schltdl.) Planch. & Triana; Rheedia gardneriana Planch. & Triana (1860), nom. cons. (basionym); Rheedia gardneriana var. glaziovii Engl.; Rheedia gardneriana var. parvifolia Engl.; Rheedia spruceana var. cuneata Engl.; Rheedia tenuifolia Engl.; Tovomita calyptrata Schltdl.

= Garcinia gardneriana =

Species of fruit and plant

Garcinia gardneriana, the bacupari, is an evergreen, dioecious species of the genus Garcinia. It is distributed throughout South America's Amazon Basin and Atlantic Forest, from Colombia and Venezuela to Paraguay and northeastern Argentina. and produces fruit with edible arils.

A Garcinia species is commercially cultivated for fruit in Bolivia, Brazil, and northern Australia under the names achachairú and achacha. The plant is commonly called Garcinia humilis, but is more likely Garcinia gardneriana.

The species was first described as Rheedia gardneriana by Jules Émile Planchon and José Jerónimo Triana in 1860. In 1993 Daniela Cristina Zappi placed the species in genus Garcinia as G. gardneriana.
