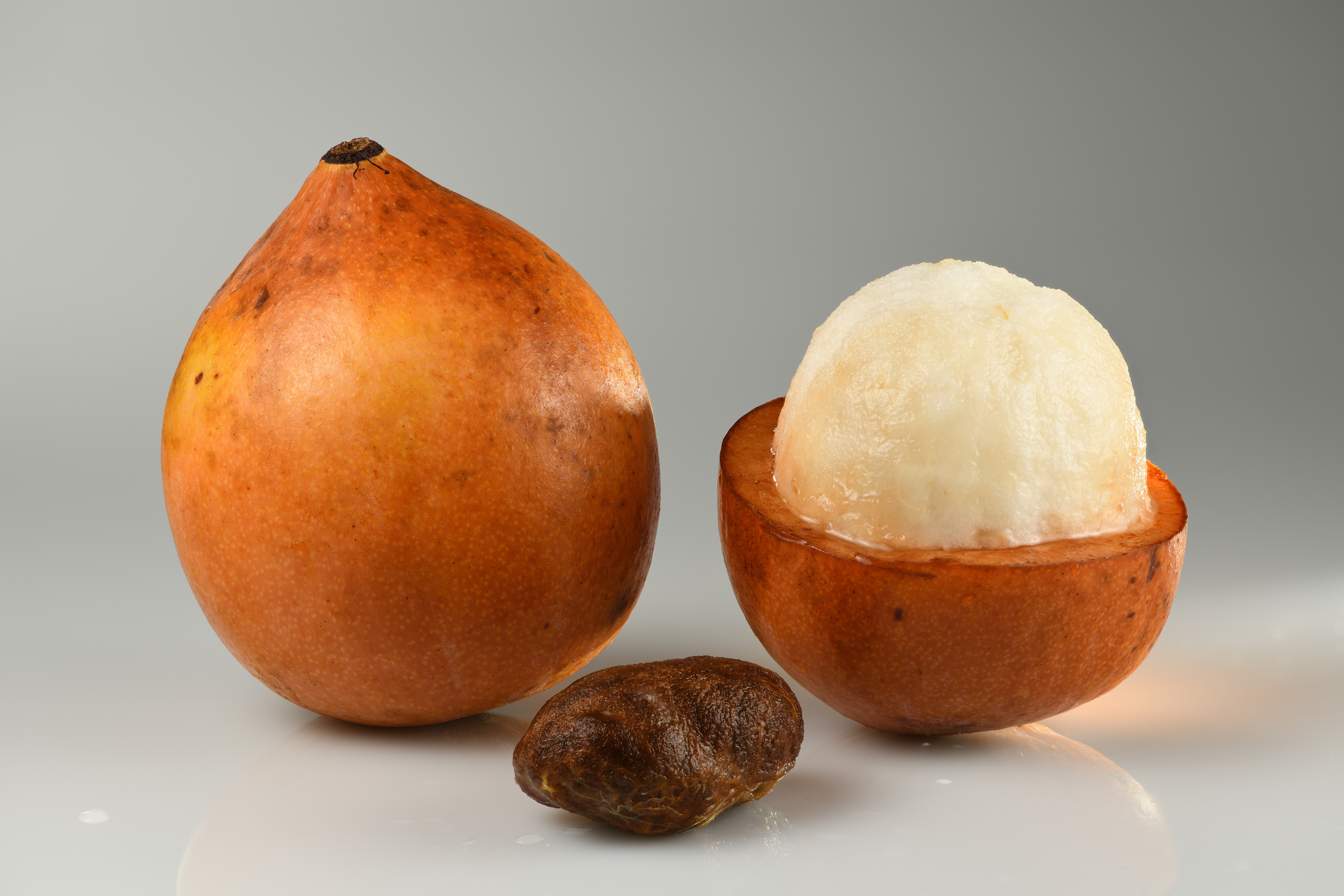
- Two Achacha fruits with a seed

Conservation status
- Least Concern (IUCN 3.1)

Scientific classification
- Kingdom: Plantae
- Clade: Tracheophytes
- Clade: Angiosperms
- Clade: Eudicots
- Clade: Rosids
- Order: Malpighiales
- Family: Clusiaceae
- Genus: Garcinia
- Species: G. humilis

Binomial name
- Garcinia humilis (Vahl) C.D.Adams

Synonyms
- Mammea humilis Vahl (1798) (basionym); Mammea humilis var. plumieri Griseb.; Mammea humilis var. vahlii Griseb.; Mammea lateriflora Griseb.; Garcinia lateriflora (L.) C.D.Adams ex Alain; Rheedia americana Christm.; Rheedia humilis (Vahl) Kosterm.; Rheedia lateriflora L.; Rheedia sessiliflora Planch. ex Vesque; Rheedia sieberi Choisy; Malpighia mitis Rchb. ex Griseb.

= Garcinia humilis =

Achacha

Fruit tree

Garcinia humilis, known commonly as abricot or wild mammee, is a species of flowering plant related to the mangosteen. It is a tree native to a region from the eastern Caribbean islands to Guyana. It grows in moist lowland and submontane forests, typically in seasonally-flooded river deltas and ravines. In Jamaica, it also grows in moist forest on karst limestone hillsides.

The species was first described as Mammea humilis by Martin Vahl in 1798. In 1970, Charles Dennis Adams placed the species in genus Garcinia as G. humilis.

== Appearance ==
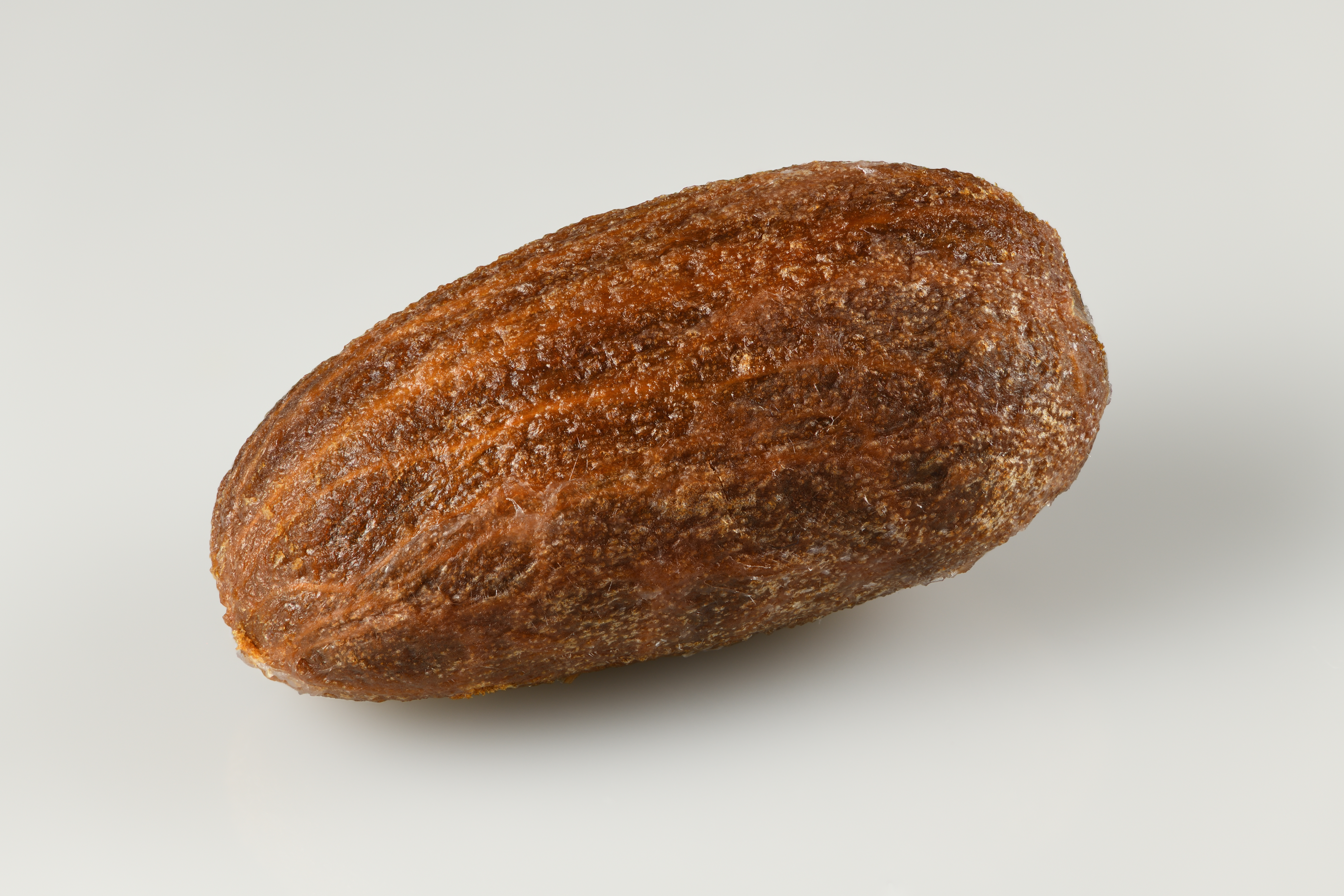
Seed

The achacha is egg-shaped and up to 6 cm long by 4 cm in diameter. It takes on a reddish-orange shade when mature. There is usually one significant coffee-coloured seed, but larger fruit may have more than one seed.

== Edible fruit ==
The taste is strongly sweet and tart, with more citrus-like acidity than the purple mangosteen. The rather tough, bitter rind can be split open with a knife or with the teeth, and the edible part of the fruit consumed with the seed.

The Queensland Department of Agriculture, Fisheries and Forestry has found that the fruit keeps well for four to six weeks as long as it stays out of the fridge. It recommends storing the fruit at 15 to 20 degrees Celsius with a high relative humidity. If these conditions are not met, the fruit will shrivel.

The glossy orange rinds of the achacha may be put in a blender with water. Once pureed and then strained to remove all of the solids, this liquid may be diluted and sweetened to one's taste, then chilled for a refreshing summer drink.

== In Australia ==
A small, prolifically fruiting Bolivian tree known as achachairú or achacha is grown as a commercial crop in northern Australia. It is commonly identified as Garcinia humilis, but is more likely Garcinia gardneriana.

== Season ==
The achacha is in season from November to January in Bolivia and from December to mid-March in Australia.
