= Syzygium rama-varmae =

Conservation status
- Endangered (IUCN 3.1)

Scientific classification
- Kingdom: Plantae
- Clade: Tracheophytes
- Clade: Angiosperms
- Clade: Eudicots
- Clade: Rosids
- Order: Myrtales
- Family: Myrtaceae
- Genus: Syzygium
- Species: S. rama-varmae

Binomial name
- Syzygium rama-varmae (Bourd.) Chithra

Synonyms
- Eugenia rama-varmae Bourd.; Jambosa rama-varmae (Bourd.) Gamble

Species of flowering plant

Syzygium rama-varmae is a species of flowering plant in the family Myrtaceae. It is a small evergreen tree which grows up to 15 metres tall. It is native to Kerala and Tamil Nadu in southwestern India, where it is known from Munnar, Agasthyamalai, and Kanyakumari in the southern Western Ghats. It grows in montane evergreen rain forest along streams and swamps from 1,100 to 1,500 metres elevation. It is associated with Cullenia exarillata, Palaquium ellipticum, Litsea bourdillonii, Mesua ferrea, Syzygium gardneri, and Garcinia pushpangadaniana.
