= Garcinia semseii =

Conservation status
- Endangered (IUCN 3.1)

Scientific classification
- Kingdom: Plantae
- Clade: Tracheophytes
- Clade: Angiosperms
- Clade: Eudicots
- Clade: Rosids
- Order: Malpighiales
- Family: Clusiaceae
- Genus: Garcinia
- Species: G. semseii

Binomial name
- Garcinia semseii Verdc.

Species of flowering plant

Garcinia semseii is a species of flowering plant in the family Clusiaceae that grows primarily in the wet tropical biome. It is a tree found only in Tanzania.
