= Garcinia epunctata =

Conservation status
- Least Concern (IUCN 3.1)

Scientific classification
- Kingdom: Plantae
- Clade: Tracheophytes
- Clade: Angiosperms
- Clade: Eudicots
- Clade: Rosids
- Order: Malpighiales
- Family: Clusiaceae
- Genus: Garcinia
- Species: G. epunctata

Binomial name
- Garcinia epunctata Stapf

Synonyms
- Garcinia balala De Wild.; Garcinia bequaertii De Wild.; Garcinia brieyi De Wild.; Garcinia cereoflava Engl.; Garcinia klainei Pierre ex Engl.; Garcinia kuluensis Spirlet; Garcinia mimfiensis Engl.; Garcinia nyangensis Pellegr.; Garcinia obscura Spirlet; Garcinia sordidoluteola De Wild.

Species of tree

Garcinia epunctata is a tall tropical rainforest tree in the family Clusiaceae. The tree is known for growing on inselbergs found in moist tropical forests of West Africa, including Upper Guinean forests, Lower Guinean forests, and Congolian forests south through Angola, both coastal and inland forests.
