= Garcinia montana =

Conservation status
- Vulnerable (IUCN 2.3)

Scientific classification
- Kingdom: Plantae
- Clade: Embryophytes
- Clade: Tracheophytes
- Clade: Spermatophytes
- Clade: Angiosperms
- Clade: Eudicots
- Clade: Rosids
- Order: Malpighiales
- Family: Clusiaceae
- Genus: Garcinia
- Species: G. montana

Binomial name
- Garcinia montana Ridl.

Species of tree

Garcinia montana is a species of flowering plant of the family Clusiaceae. It is a tree endemic to Peninsular Malaysia.

The species was described by Henry Nicholas Ridley, and published in the Journal of the Straits Branch of the Royal Asiatic Society in 1901.
