= Garcinia nitida =

Conservation status
- Near Threatened (IUCN 3.1)

Scientific classification
- Kingdom: Plantae
- Clade: Tracheophytes
- Clade: Angiosperms
- Clade: Eudicots
- Clade: Rosids
- Order: Malpighiales
- Family: Clusiaceae
- Genus: Garcinia
- Species: G. nitida

Binomial name
- Garcinia nitida Pierre

Species of flowering plant

Garcinia nitida, also known as kandis hutan, is a species of flowering plant, a dioecious understorey fruit tree in the mangosteen family, that is native to Southeast Asia.

== Description ==
The tree grows to 30 m in height, with a 2–6 m bole and small fluted buttresses. The smooth oval leaves are 6–10 cm long by 3–4 cm wide. The white to cream flowers are 4-petalled. The fruits are oval berries, 3–4 cm by 2.5–3 cm in diameter, ripening from yellow to pale orange, enclosing light brown seeds covered with a translucent, edible, sour arillode.

== Distribution and habitat ==
The species is endemic to Borneo, where it is found in lowland and hill mixed dipterocarp forest up to an elevation of 900 m.

== Usage ==
The species is not commonly cultivated. The sour rind and pulp of the fruits are used as a substitute for tamarind in condiments with cooked rice, fish and curries, as well as in jam and sweetened drinks.
