= Garcinia lateriflora =

Scientific classification
- Kingdom: Plantae
- Clade: Embryophytes
- Clade: Tracheophytes
- Clade: Angiosperms
- Clade: Eudicots
- Clade: Rosids
- Order: Malpighiales
- Family: Clusiaceae
- Genus: Garcinia
- Species: G. lateriflora

Binomial name
- Garcinia lateriflora Blume

Species of plant

Garcinia lateriflora, commonly known as kandis, is a species of flowering plantin the genus Garcinia. The species is native from Sumatra to central Malaysia, and it grows best in warm, wet environments.
