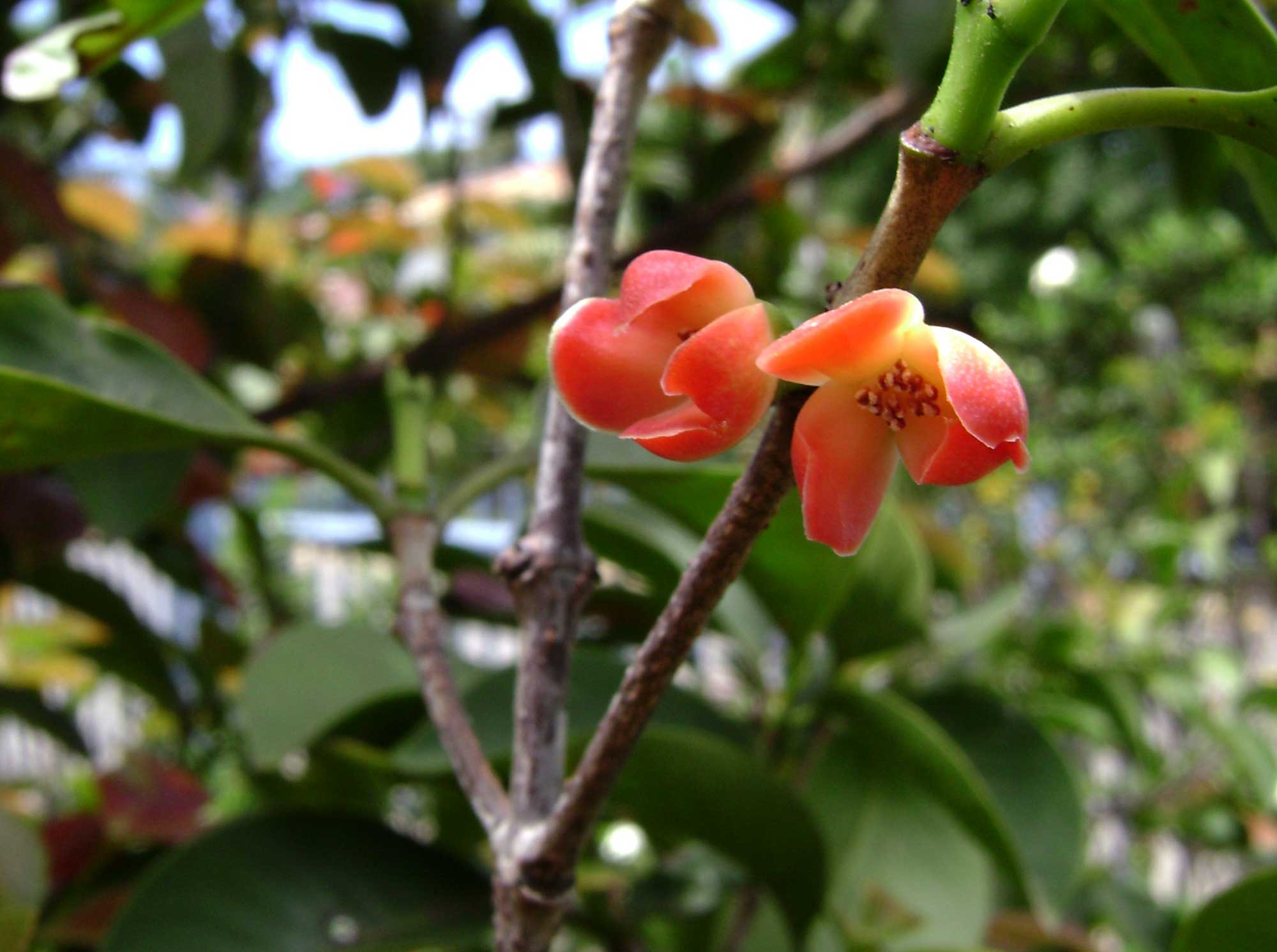

Conservation status
- Least Concern (IUCN 3.1)

Scientific classification
- Kingdom: Plantae
- Clade: Tracheophytes
- Clade: Angiosperms
- Clade: Eudicots
- Clade: Rosids
- Order: Malpighiales
- Family: Clusiaceae
- Genus: Garcinia
- Species: G. sessilis

Binomial name
- Garcinia sessilis (G.Forst) Seem.

Synonyms
- Clusia sessilis G.Forst.; Firkea sessilis (G.Forst.) Raf.

= Garcinia sessilis =

Species of flowering plant

Garcinia sessilis, commonly known as heilala in Tongan, is an evergreen tree native to Fiji and the Santa Cruz Islands and introduced to Tonga and Samoa. The heilala flower is the national flower of Tonga.

The species was first described as Clusia sessilis by Georg Forster in 1786. In 1862 Berthold Carl Seemann placed the species in genus Garcinia as G. sessilis.

== Description ==
Garcinia sessilis, also known as heilala in Tonga or seilala in Samoa, grows from 4 to 20 meters tall and can have a bole up to 30 cm in diameter. G. sessilis is a fruiting tree which produces flowers that range in color from pale yellow or pink tinged, to a coral red or carmine, and the fruits range from a yellowish white to red at maturity.

== Distribution and habitat ==
Garcinia sessilis is native to Fiji and the Santa Cruz Islands, and has been introduced to Tonga and the Samoan Islands. This species belongs to the genus of Garcinia, which is native to regions of Asia, America, Australia, Africa, and Polynesia. G. sessilis grows in a variety of habitats, ranging from rainforest, the periphery of mangrove swamps, to dense or dry forests. It grows from sea level up to around 1,150 meters.

== Uses ==
The fruit is red, obovoid, around 4 centimeters long, and can be eaten raw. The bark of the plant is used medicinally. The leaves crushed in water can be used as an eye wash.The flowers are used in garlands (leis) and also to scent coconut oil. The timber is used as a building material.

== Culture ==
Garcinia sessilis is the national flower of the Kingdom of Tonga and is a symbol of royalty. The Heilala festival happens in Tonga in July, celebrating the king's birthday.
