= Garcinia diospyrifolia =

Conservation status
- Least Concern (IUCN 3.1)

Scientific classification
- Kingdom: Plantae
- Clade: Tracheophytes
- Clade: Angiosperms
- Clade: Eudicots
- Clade: Rosids
- Order: Malpighiales
- Family: Clusiaceae
- Genus: Garcinia
- Species: G. diospyrifolia

Binomial name
- Garcinia diospyrifolia Pierre

Varieties
- Garcinia diospyrifolia var. cataractalis (Whitmore) Nazre; Garcinia diospyrifolia var. diospyrifolia; Garcinia diospyrifolia var. minor Ng ex Nazre

Synonyms
- synonyms of var. cataractalis: Garcinia cataractalis Whitmore; synonyms of var. diospyrifolia: Garcinia opaca King; Garcinia opaca var. dumosa Whitmore

Species of tree

Garcinia diospyrifolia is a species of flowering plant in the family Clusiaceae. It is a tree native to Peninsular Malaysia and Borneo, where it grows in lowland and montane rain forest.

Three varieties are accepted.

- Garcinia diospyrifolia var. cataractalis (Whitmore) Nazre – Peninsular Malaysia (Terengganu)
- Garcinia diospyrifolia var. diospyrifolia – Borneo and Peninsular Malaysia
- Garcinia diospyrifolia var. minor Ng ex Nazre – Peninsular Malaysia
