= Garcinia minutiflora =

Conservation status
- Least Concern (IUCN 3.1)

Scientific classification
- Kingdom: Plantae
- Clade: Tracheophytes
- Clade: Angiosperms
- Clade: Eudicots
- Clade: Rosids
- Order: Malpighiales
- Family: Clusiaceae
- Genus: Garcinia
- Species: G. minutiflora

Binomial name
- Garcinia minutiflora Ridl.

Species of tree

Garcinia minutiflora is a species of flowering plant in the family Clusiaceae. It is a tree native to northwestern and north-central Peninsular Malaysia and southwestern Peninsular Thailand. It grows in lowland rain forest on limestone hills, in a narrow elevational band at about 100 metres elevation.

The species was described by Henry Nicholas Ridley in 1920.
