= Garcinia holttumii =

Conservation status
- Vulnerable (IUCN 2.3)

Scientific classification
- Kingdom: Plantae
- Clade: Tracheophytes
- Clade: Angiosperms
- Clade: Eudicots
- Clade: Rosids
- Order: Malpighiales
- Family: Clusiaceae
- Genus: Garcinia
- Species: G. holttumii

Binomial name
- Garcinia holttumii Ridl.

Species of flowering plant

Garcinia holttumii is a species of flowering plant in the family Clusiaceae. It is a shrub or tree endemic to Johor in Peninsular Malaysia, where it is known only from the summit of Gunung Belumut.

The species was described by Henry Nicholas Ridley in 1924.
