= Garcinia loureiroi =

Scientific classification
- Kingdom: Plantae
- Clade: Tracheophytes
- Clade: Angiosperms
- Clade: Eudicots
- Clade: Rosids
- Order: Malpighiales
- Family: Clusiaceae
- Genus: Garcinia
- Species: G. loureiroi

Binomial name
- Garcinia loureiroi Pierre

Species of tree

Garcinia loureiroi is a tree species in the family Clusiaceae. The Catalogue of Life lists no subspecies.

Garcinia loureiroi is called bứa nhà in Vietnamese and (Khmer: សណ្ដាន់) in Cambodia. Its sour fruit and leaves are used widely in Cambodian cuisine, specifically in a version of the dish samlor machu.
