= Garcinia zeylanica =

Conservation status
- Endangered (IUCN 2.3)

Scientific classification
- Kingdom: Plantae
- Clade: Tracheophytes
- Clade: Angiosperms
- Clade: Eudicots
- Clade: Rosids
- Order: Malpighiales
- Family: Clusiaceae
- Genus: Garcinia
- Species: G. zeylanica

Binomial name
- Garcinia zeylanica Roxb.

Synonyms
- Garcinia cambogia var. zeylanica (Roxb.) Vesque

Species of flowering plant

Garcinia zeylanica is a terrestrial species of flowering plant in the family Clusiaceae. It is a tree native to southwestern Sri Lanka, where it can be seen only in three forest localities. According to Plants of the World Online it is also native to southern India.
