= Garcinia oliveri =

Conservation status
- Least Concern (IUCN 3.1)

Scientific classification
- Kingdom: Plantae
- Clade: Tracheophytes
- Clade: Angiosperms
- Clade: Eudicots
- Clade: Rosids
- Order: Malpighiales
- Family: Clusiaceae
- Genus: Garcinia
- Species: G. oliveri

Binomial name
- Garcinia oliveri Pierre

Synonyms
- Garcinia oliveri var. insularis Pierre ex Pit.

Species of tree

Garcinia oliveri is a cousin species of the mangosteen and also bears edible fruit. This plant is also known by local names ໂມງ ([móːŋ]) in Laotian, Bứa núi in Vietnamese, and Tromoung in Khmer. It is native to Cambodia, Laos, Myanmar, and Vietnam in South-East Asia. It grows in lowland tropical moist forests.

This plant is a tree that grows up to 30 m high, with drooping branches. The leaves are large, thick, blade oblongs that are 10–27 cm long, attached to short petioles about 1 cm long. Its male flowers have 5 petals and 1 cm long stamens united into 5 bundles, while its hermaphroditic flowers have ovaries with 9–10 loculi. Its fruits are globose, about 4–5 cm in diameter, with red pericarp.

In Vietnam, the plant's young leaves are used for food, such as being cooked in soup, or eaten fresh in a dish called banh xeo.
