= Garcinia celebica =

Conservation status
- Least Concern (IUCN 3.1)

Scientific classification
- Kingdom: Plantae
- Clade: Tracheophytes
- Clade: Angiosperms
- Clade: Eudicots
- Clade: Rosids
- Order: Malpighiales
- Family: Clusiaceae
- Genus: Garcinia
- Species: G. celebica

Binomial name
- Garcinia celebica L.

Synonyms
- Discostigma febrile Miq.; Garcinia affinis Wall. ex Pierre, nom. illeg. homonym. post.; Garcinia basacensis Pierre; Garcinia benthamii Pierre; Garcinia broewas Boerl.; Garcinia cornea L.; Garcinia fabrilis Miq.; Garcinia ferrea Pierre; Garcinia hombroniana Pierre; Garcinia jawoera Pierre; Garcinia krawang Pierre; Garcinia massoniana Klotzsch ex Planch. & Triana; Garcinia porrecta Wall. ex Vesque, nom. illeg. homonym. post.; Garcinia riedeliana Pierre; Garcinia rumphii Pierre; Garcinia sintang Boerl.; Garcinia speciosa Wall.; Oxycarpus celebica (L.) Poir.; Oxycarpus indica Buch.-Ham. ex Wall., not validly publ.; Stalagmitis celebica (L.) G.Don

Species of tree

Garcinia celebica is an accepted name of a tree species in the family Clusiaceae. It is native to India, Indochina, Malesia, and Papuasia. The Catalogue of Life lists no subspecies.

== Vernacular names ==
A number of descriptions of this (evidently variable) plant, notably in Indo-China by Pierre and others, relate to records under synonyms such as Garcinia benthamii and G. ferrea; the latter has been called rỏi mật (sometimes gỏi) in Vietnamese. The species name indicates an original description in the Celebes (Sulawesi) and it is found throughout Malesia, with local names (especially Borneo) including: Kalawet, Kandis, Kandis pulan, Manggis, Manggis hutan, Perda-perda and Sungkep.

== Description ==
Based on the above, the species is a tropical forest main canopy tree some 25–30 m high in Vietnam, or up to 36 m tall and 0.93 m dbh in Indonesia; trunks and stems can exude white to yellow latex. The leaves are approximately 130 x 60 mm. Flowers are yellowish, approximately 12 mm. Fruits are ovoid up to 45 mm: with 5-10 segments.
