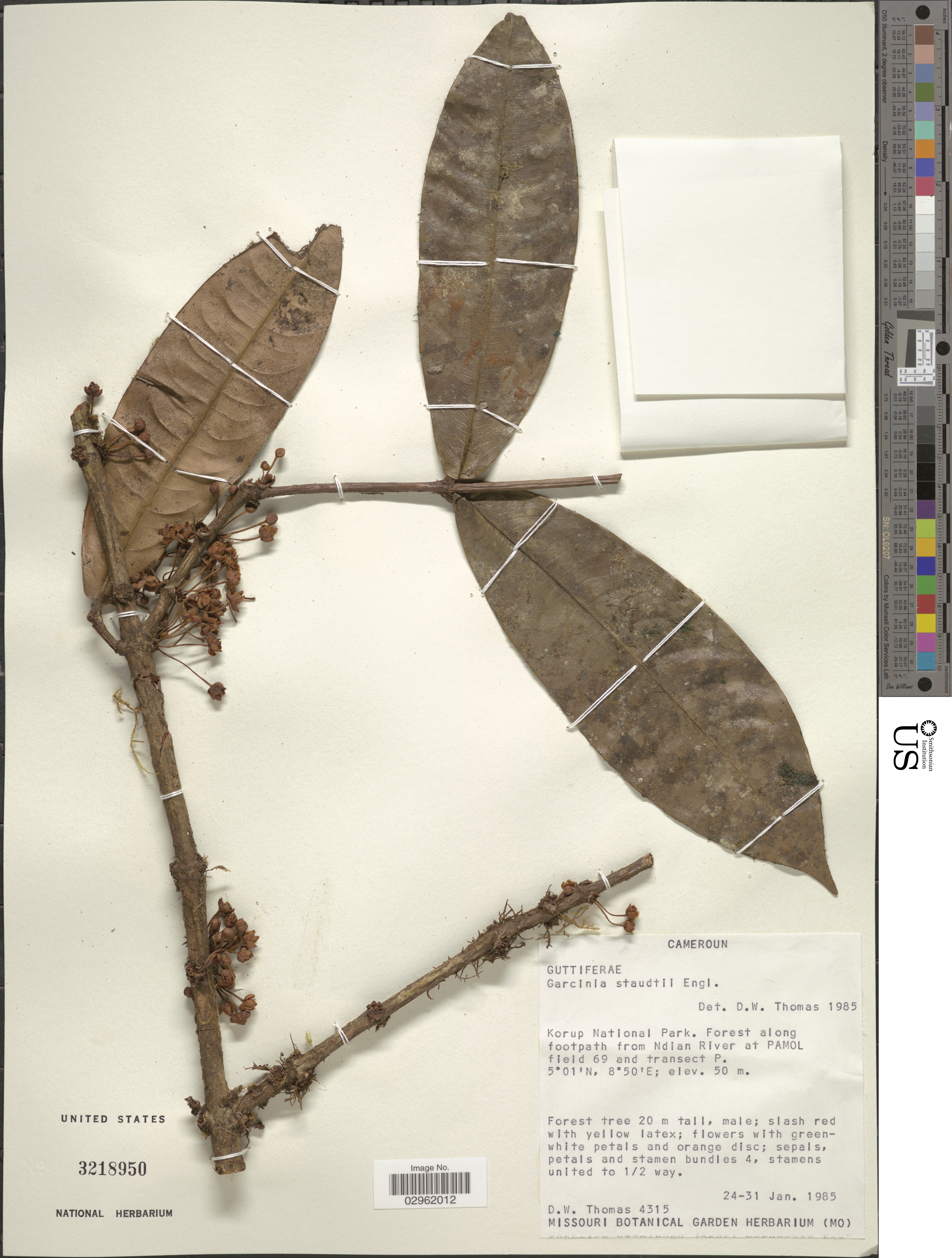
- A herbarium specimen of Garcinia staudtii

Conservation status
- Vulnerable (IUCN 2.3)

Scientific classification
- Kingdom: Plantae
- Clade: Tracheophytes
- Clade: Angiosperms
- Clade: Eudicots
- Clade: Rosids
- Order: Malpighiales
- Family: Clusiaceae
- Genus: Garcinia
- Species: G. staudtii

Binomial name
- Garcinia staudtii Engl.

= Garcinia staudtii =

Species of flowering plant

Garcinia staudtii is a species of flowering plant in the family Clusiaceae. It is found in Cameroon and Nigeria. It is threatened by habitat loss.
