= Garcinia thwaitesii =

Conservation status
- Endangered (IUCN 2.3)

Scientific classification
- Kingdom: Plantae
- Clade: Tracheophytes
- Clade: Angiosperms
- Clade: Eudicots
- Clade: Rosids
- Order: Malpighiales
- Family: Clusiaceae
- Genus: Garcinia
- Species: G. thwaitesii

Binomial name
- Garcinia thwaitesii Pierre

Synonyms
- Garcinia ovalifolia var. acutifolia Hook.f.; Garcinia spicata var. acutifolia (Hook.f.) Vesque

Species of flowering plant

Garcinia thwaitesii is a species of flowering plant in the family Clusiaceae. It is a tree found only in southwestern Sri Lanka.
