= Garcinia cadelliana =

Conservation status
- Critically Endangered (IUCN 2.3)

Scientific classification
- Kingdom: Plantae
- Clade: Tracheophytes
- Clade: Angiosperms
- Clade: Eudicots
- Clade: Rosids
- Order: Malpighiales
- Family: Clusiaceae
- Genus: Garcinia
- Species: G. cadelliana

Binomial name
- Garcinia cadelliana King

Species of flowering plant

Garcinia cadelliana is a critically endangered species of small tree in the family Clusiaceae. It is found only on the South Andaman Island of India.
