= Garcinia maingayi =

Conservation status
- Least Concern (IUCN 3.1)

Scientific classification
- Kingdom: Plantae
- Clade: Tracheophytes
- Clade: Angiosperms
- Clade: Eudicots
- Clade: Rosids
- Order: Malpighiales
- Family: Clusiaceae
- Genus: Garcinia
- Species: G. maingayi

Binomial name
- Garcinia maingayi Hook.f. ex T.Anderson

Synonyms
- Garcinia baillonii Pierre; Garcinia maingayi var. stylosa King

Species of tree

Garcinia maingayi is a species of flowering plant in the family Clusiaceae. It is a tree found in Peninsular Malaysia and Borneo. It grows in lowland and montane rain forests.
