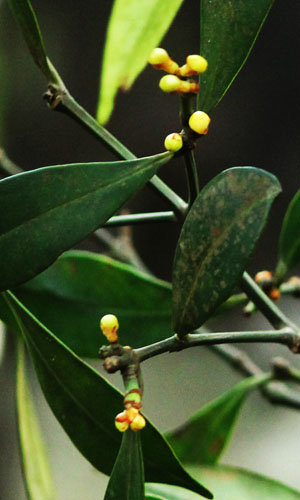

Conservation status
- Critically Endangered (IUCN 3.1)

Scientific classification
- Kingdom: Plantae
- Clade: Tracheophytes
- Clade: Angiosperms
- Clade: Eudicots
- Clade: Rosids
- Order: Malpighiales
- Family: Clusiaceae
- Genus: Garcinia
- Species: G. imbertii

Binomial name
- Garcinia imbertii Bourd.

= Garcinia imbertii =

Species of flowering plant

Garcinia imbertii is a species of flowering plant in the family Clusiaceae. It is endemic to the southern Western Ghats of Kerala and Tamil Nadu in southwestern India, where it grows in submontane evergreen moist forests in the Agasthyamala Biosphere Reserve.
