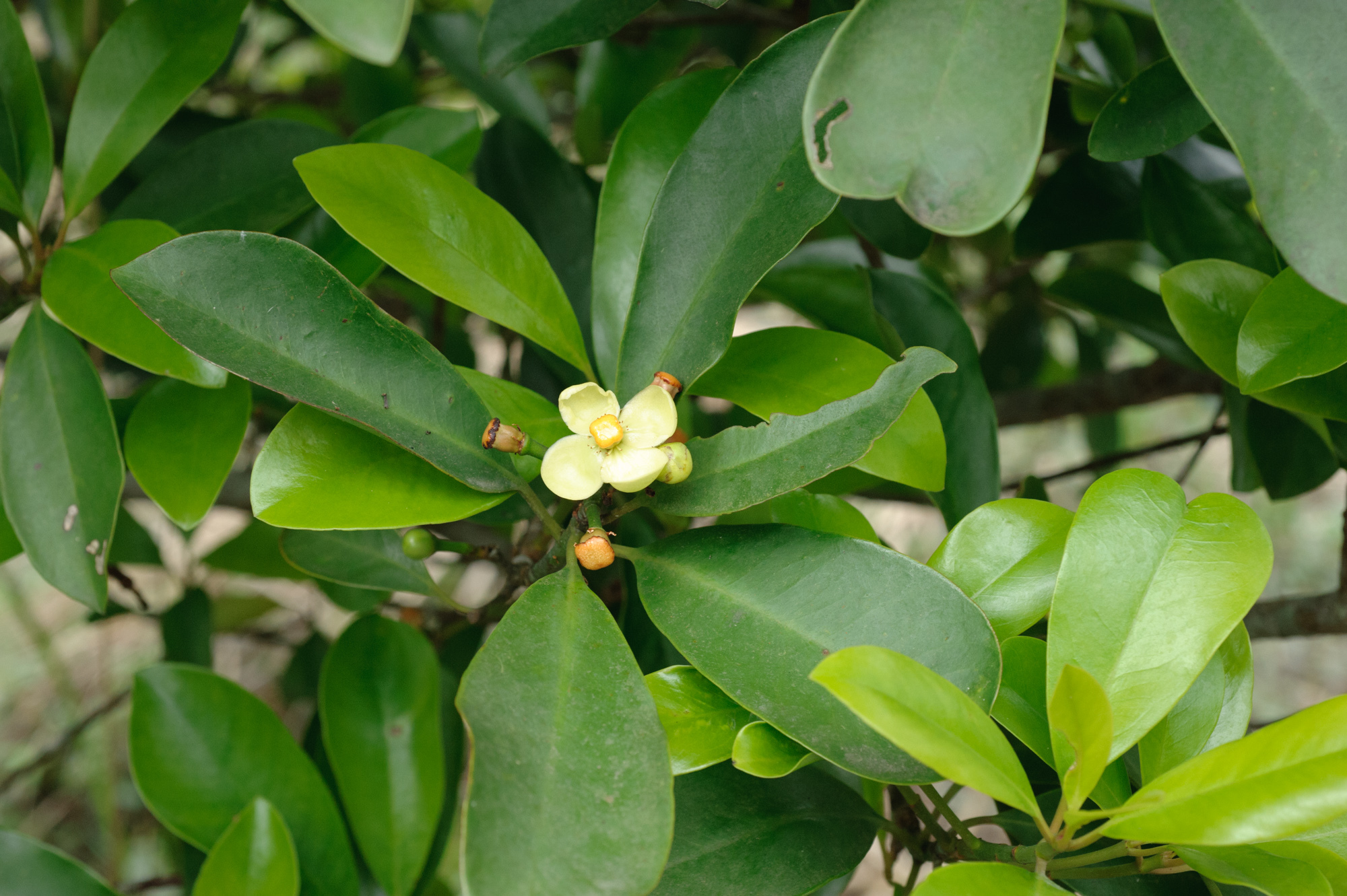

Scientific classification
- Kingdom: Plantae
- Clade: Tracheophytes
- Clade: Angiosperms
- Clade: Eudicots
- Clade: Rosids
- Order: Malpighiales
- Family: Clusiaceae
- Genus: Garcinia
- Species: G. multiflora

Binomial name
- Garcinia multiflora Champ. ex Benth.

Synonyms
- Garcinia hainanensis Merr.

= Garcinia multiflora =

Species of tree

Garcinia multiflora is a species of tree in the family Clusiaceae. No subspecies are listed in the Catalogue of Life.

It is called dọc in Vietnamese and used to flavour and colour bún riêu soup.
