= Garcinia echinocarpa =

Scientific classification
- Kingdom: Plantae
- Clade: Tracheophytes
- Clade: Angiosperms
- Clade: Eudicots
- Clade: Rosids
- Order: Malpighiales
- Family: Clusiaceae
- Genus: Garcinia
- Species: G. echinocarpa

Binomial name
- Garcinia echinocarpa Thw.

Species of flowering plant

Garcinia echinocarpa is a species of small to medium tree in the family Clusiaceae.
