= Garcinia monantha =

Conservation status
- Least Concern (IUCN 3.1)

Scientific classification
- Kingdom: Plantae
- Clade: Tracheophytes
- Clade: Angiosperms
- Clade: Eudicots
- Clade: Rosids
- Order: Malpighiales
- Family: Clusiaceae
- Genus: Garcinia
- Species: G. monantha

Binomial name
- Garcinia monantha Ridl.

Species of flowering plant

Garcinia monantha is a species of flowering plant in the family Clusiaceae. It is a tree endemic to Peninsular Malaysia. It is native to four Malaysian states (Kelantan, Pahang, Selangor, and Terengganu) where it grows in montane rain forest.

The species was described by Henry Nicholas Ridley in 1915.
