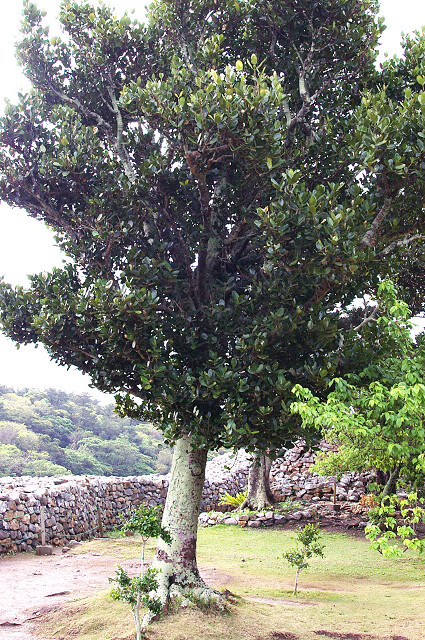
- Garcinia subelliptica, the fukugi tree

Scientific classification
- Kingdom: Plantae
- Clade: Embryophytes
- Clade: Tracheophytes
- Clade: Angiosperms
- Clade: Eudicots
- Clade: Rosids
- Order: Malpighiales
- Family: Clusiaceae
- Tribe: Garcinieae
- Genus: Garcinia; L.

Species
- See list of Garcinia species

Synonyms
- Allanblackia Oliv.; Biwaldia Scop.; Brindonia Thouars; Cambogia L.; Chloromyron Pers.; Clusianthemum Vieill.; Coddampulli Adans.; Discostigma Hassk.; Hebradendron Graham; Koddampuli Adans.; Lamprophyllum Miers; Magostan Adans.; Mangostana Rumph. ex Gaertn.; Ochrocarpos Noronha ex Thouars (Ochrocarpus was an orthographic variant); Oxycarpus Lour.; Pentaphalangium Warb.; Platorheedia Rojas; Rheedia L.; Rhinostigma Miq.; Septogarcinia Kosterm.; Stalagmites Spreng.; Stalagmitis Murray; Terpnophyllum Thwaites; Tripetalum K.Schum.; Tsimatimia Jum. & H.Perrier; Verticillaria Ruiz & Pav.; Xanthochymus Roxb.

= Garcinia =

Genus of flowering plants

Garcinia is a genus of flowering plants in the family Clusiaceae native to the Sundaland bioregion of Asia, America, Australia, tropical and southern Africa, and Polynesia. The number of species is disputed; Plants of the World Online (POWO) recognise up to 400. Commonly, the plants in this genus are called saptrees, mangosteens (which may also refer specifically to Garcinia mangostana), or garcinias, and is one of several plants known as by the name "monkey fruit". The genus is named after French botanist Laurent Garcin (1683–1751).

Trees of many species from this genus tend to grow deep in forested areas where other plants grow nearby. They are threatened by habitat destruction, and at least one species, G. cadelliana, from South Andaman Island, is almost or even completely extinct already.

== Description ==
Garcinia species are evergreen trees and shrubs, dioecious and in several cases apomictic. Among neotropical Garcinia, several species are dioecious (G. leptophylla, G. macrophylla and G. magnifolia), although male and female trees have often been observed to have some degree of self-fertility.

The flowering season of garcinias may happen after 10–15 years after growth. Male flowers last longer than female flowers that lose petals after a short blooming period. The species' female flower stigmas swell to produce berries with fleshy white flesh with reddish to dark-coloured woody exocarps when they ripen; the stigma lobes can be seen on the opposite or free ends (exterior apices) of many species' fruits. The fruits are food source for several animals, such as the archduke butterflies (Lexias spp.) of tropical eastern Asia which relish the sap of overripe mangosteens.

== Uses ==
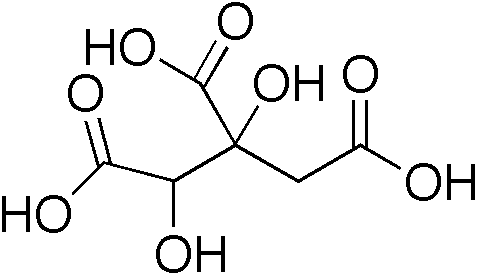
Hydroxycitric acid, a chemical compound found in mangosteen rind

The fruit of most species of Garcinia are eaten locally; some species' fruits are highly esteemed in one region, but unknown just a few hundred kilometres away. The best-known species is Garcinia mangostana, which is now cultivated throughout Southeast Asia and other tropical countries, having become established in the late 20th century. Less well-known, but still of international importance, are kandis (G. forbesii) with small round red fruits with moderately acidic taste and melting flesh, the lemon drop mangosteen (G. intermedia) with yellow fruit that look like a wrinkled lemon, and the thin-skinned orange button mangosteen (G. prainiana).

In addition, mangosteen rind (exocarp) extract is used as a spice. It figures prominently in Kodava culture, and G. multiflora is used to flavour and colour the famous bún riêu soup of Vietnam, where this plant is known as hạt điều màu. Garcinia gummi-gutta yields a spice widely used in South Asia, in particular in Kerala, where it is called kodumpulli.

Most species in Garcinia are known for their gum resin, brownish-yellow from xanthonoids such as mangostin, and used as purgative or cathartic, but most frequently – at least in former times – as a pigment. The colour term gamboge refers to this pigment.

Extracts of the exocarp of certain species – typically G. gummi-gutta, but also G. mangostana – are often contained in appetite suppressants, but their effectiveness at normal consumption levels is unproven. At least one case of severe acidosis caused by long-term consumption of such products has been documented. Furthermore, they may contain significant amounts of hydroxycitric acid, which is somewhat toxic and might even destroy the testicles after prolonged use.

Bitter kola (G. kola) seeds are used in folk medicine. G. mannii is popular as a chew stick in western Africa, freshening the breath and cleaning the teeth.

G. subelliptica, called fukugi in Japanese, is the floral emblem of Mobuto and Tarama on Okinawa. The Malaysian town of Beruas – often spelled "Bruas" – derives its name from the seashore mangosteen (G. hombroniana), known locally as pokok bruas. It has been used for many years by certain African tribes as a tonic believed to increase 'energy levels' and to possess digestive and fat-busting properties.

Some trees in the former genus Allanblackia, now considered a synonym of Garcinia, produce an edible oil known as Allanblackia oil. The genus name commemorates Allan Black.

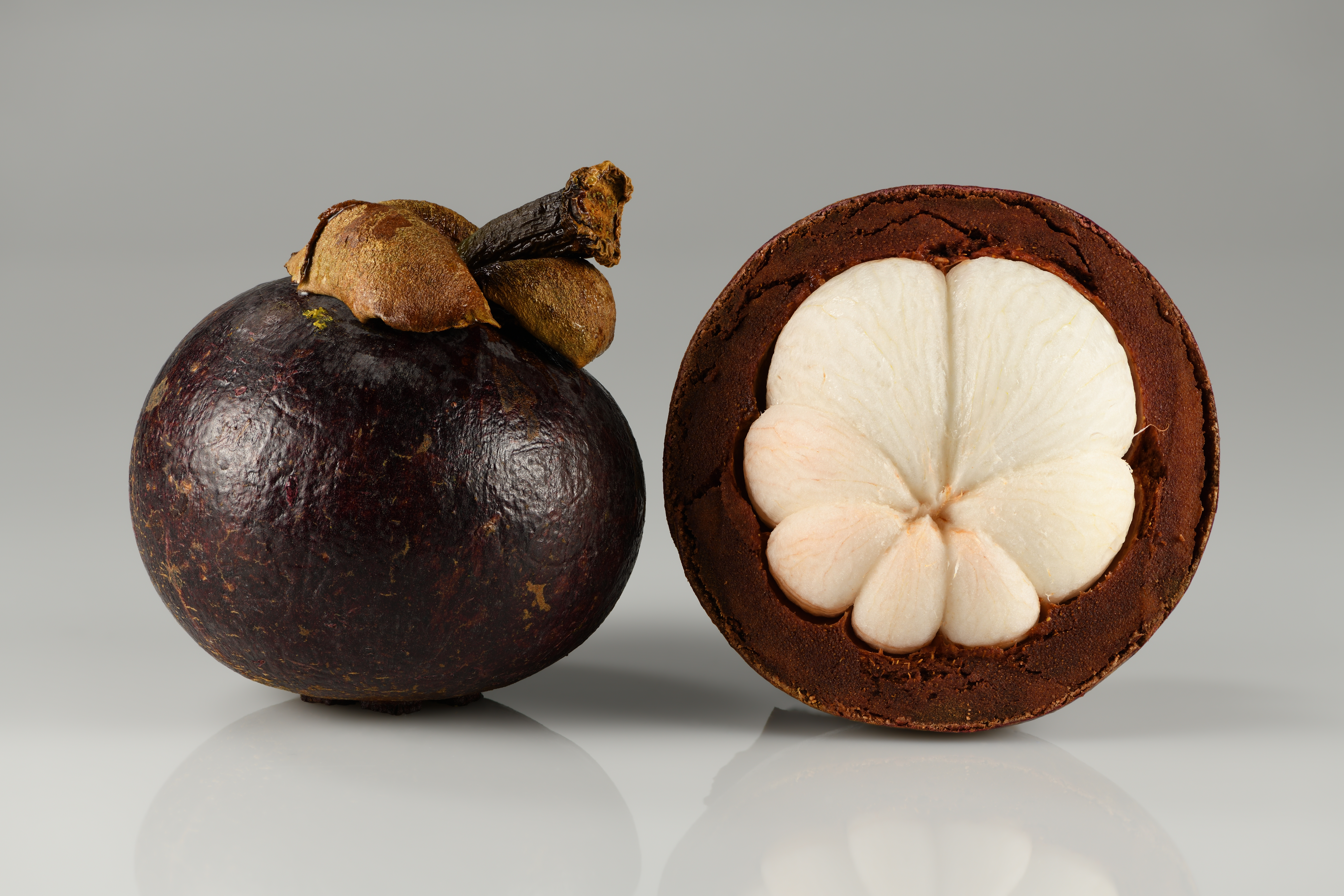
Garcinia mangostana (purple mangosteen) with white, edible endocarp

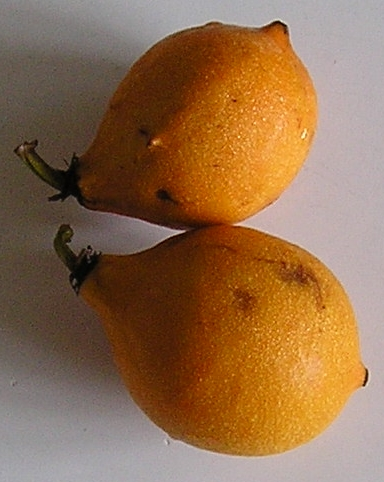
Garcinia gardneriana (bacupari)

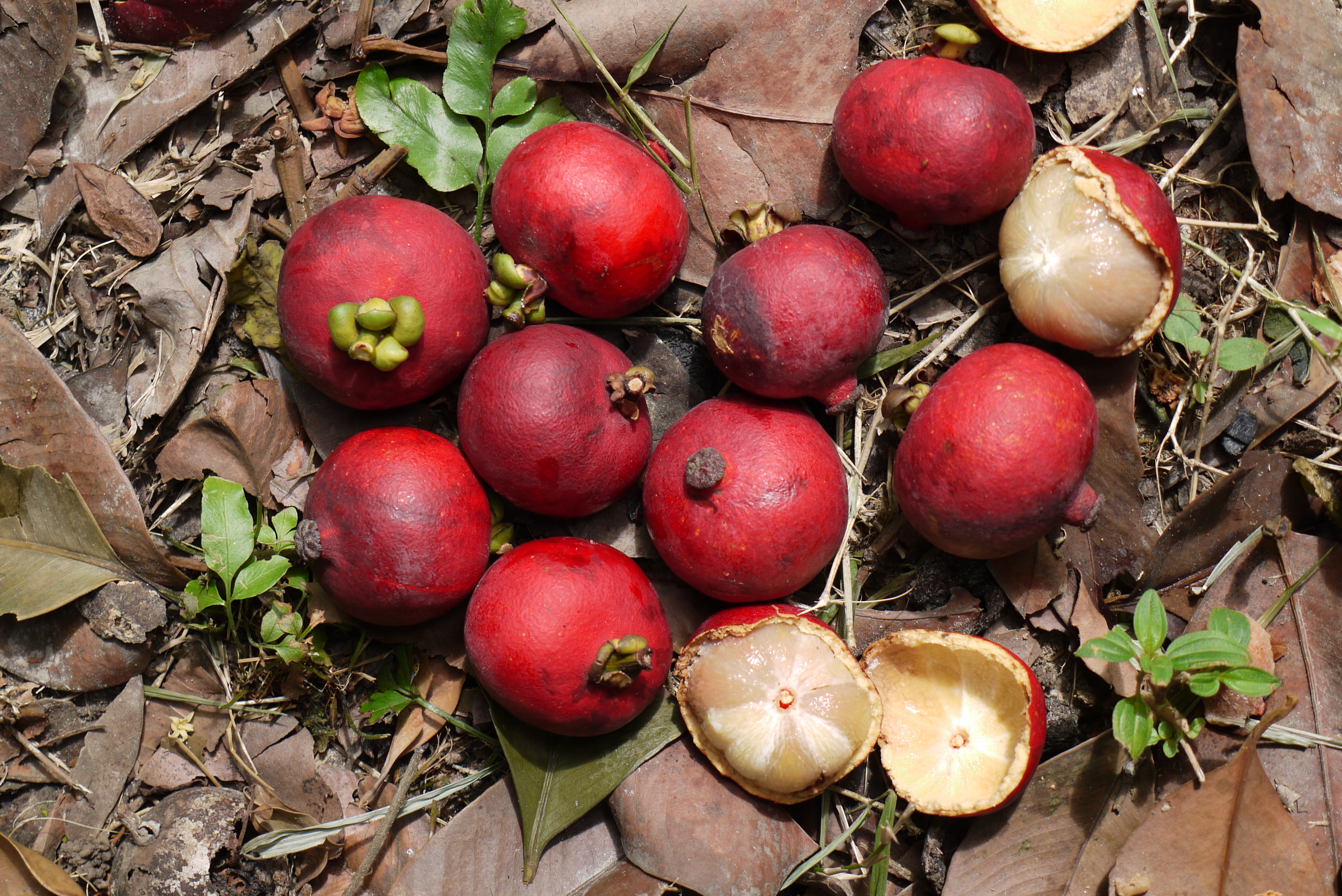
Garcinia hombroniana

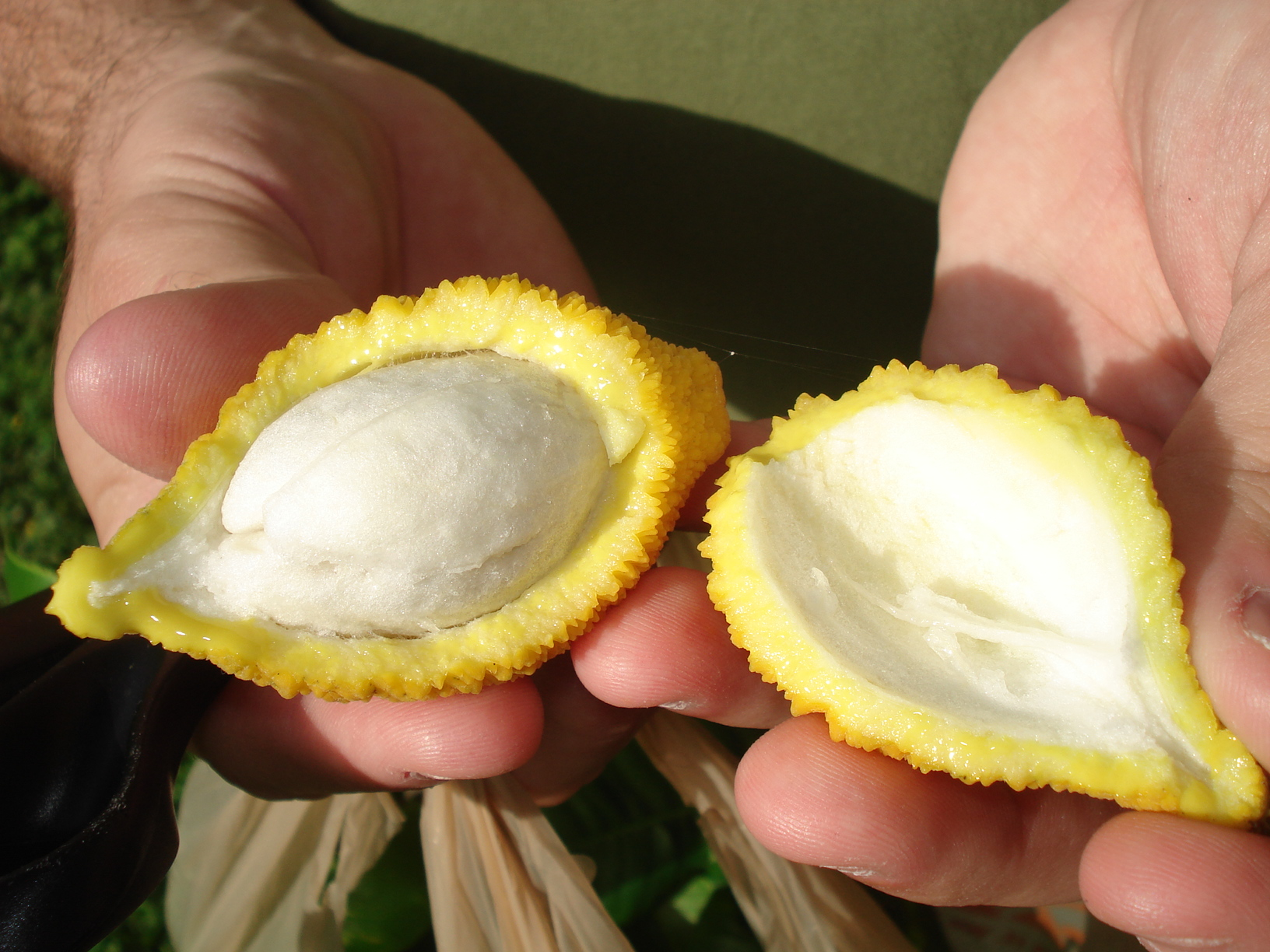
Garcinia madruno

== Selected species ==
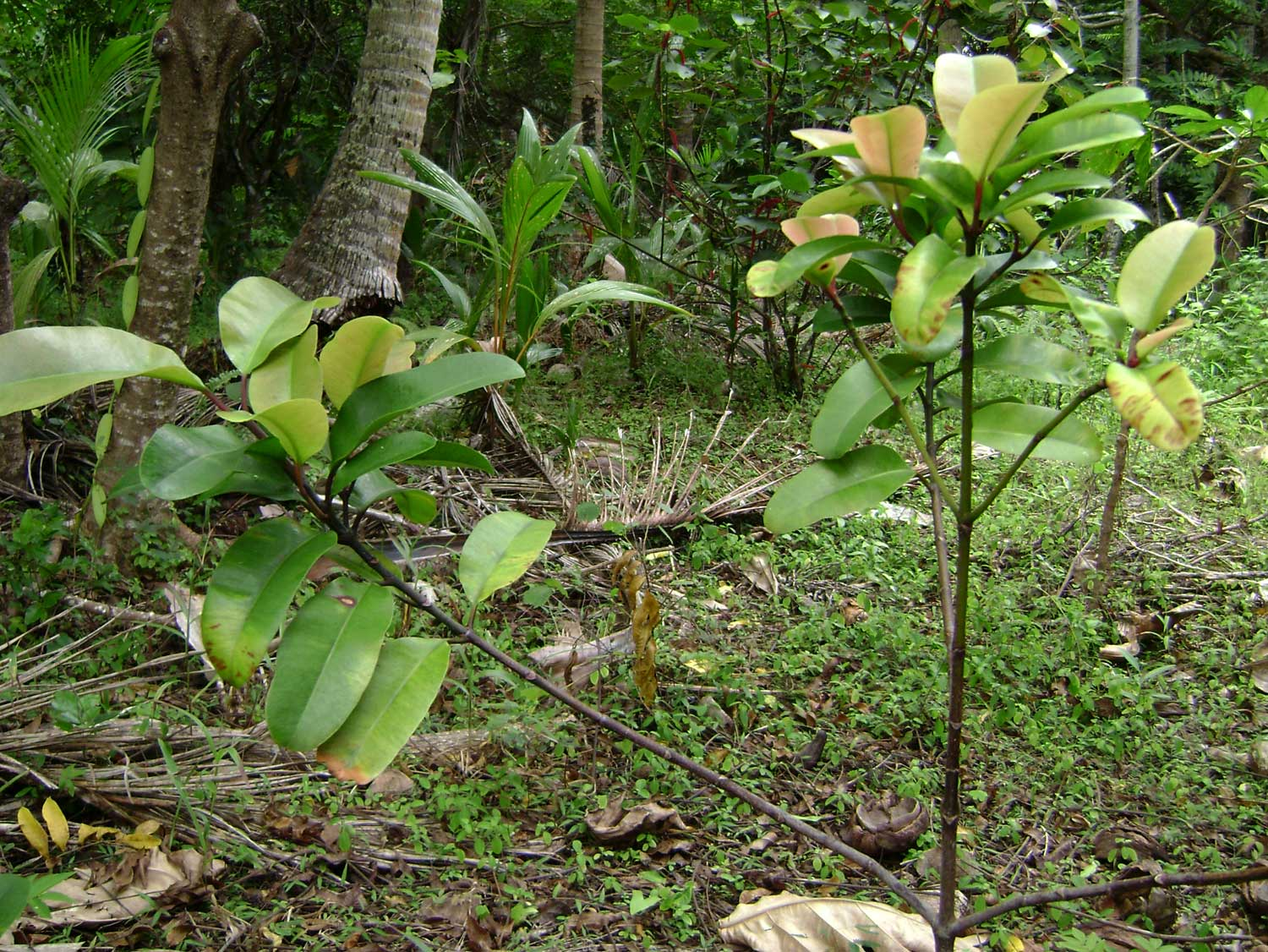
Young moʻonia tree (Garcinia pseudoguttifera)

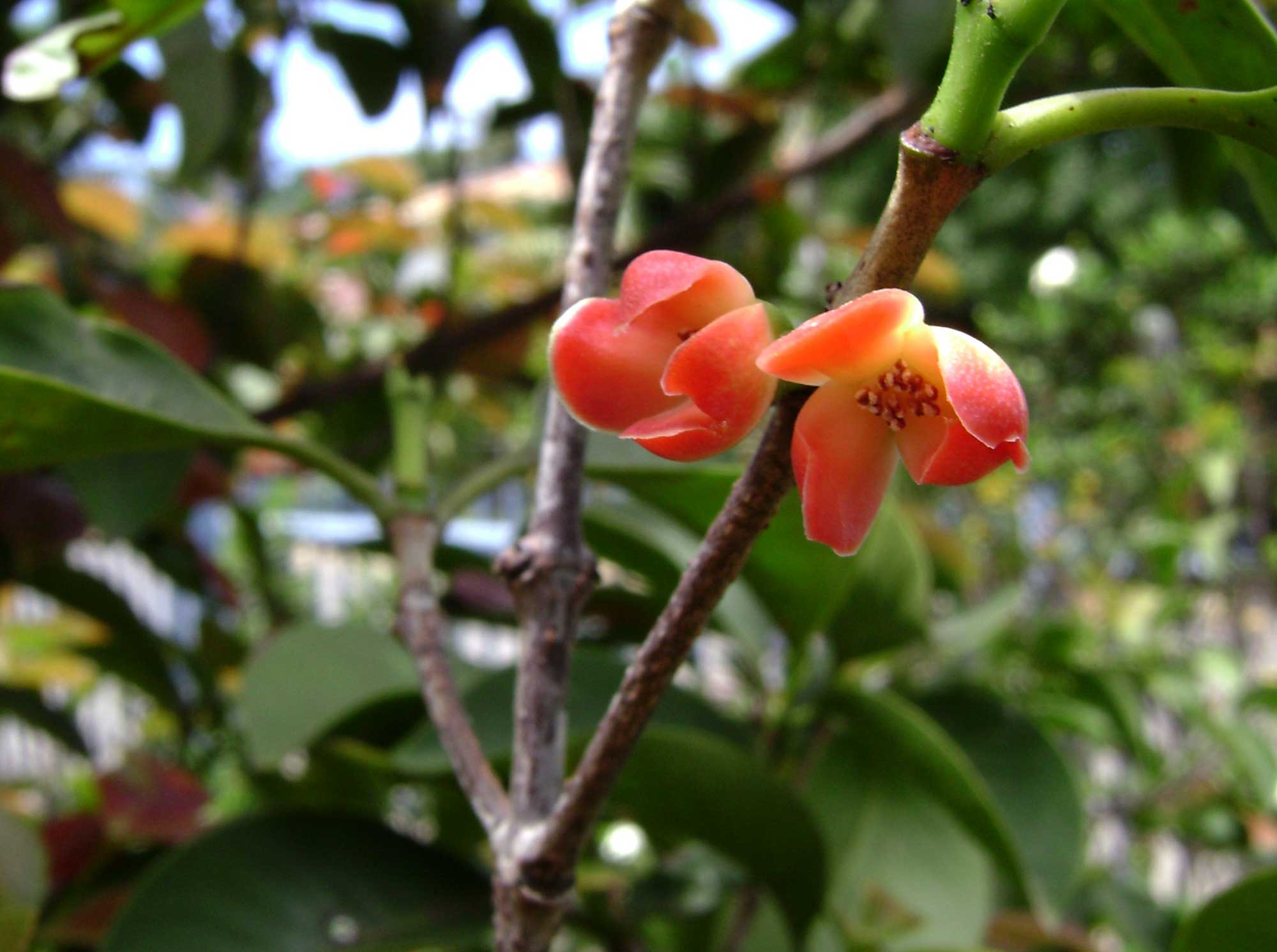
Heilala (Garcinia sessilis) flowers

As of April 2026, Kew's Plants of the World Online accepts 416 species. Selected species include:

- Garcinia acutifolia
- Garcinia afzelii
- Garcinia aristata
- Garcinia assamica
- Garcinia atroviridis – asam gelugur (Indonesian), asam gelugor (Malaysian), asam keping (Malaysian)
- Garcinia benthamiana – asashi
- Garcinia bifasciculata
- Garcinia binucao - batuan (Hiligaynon), binukaw (Visayan)
- Garcinia brasiliensis – bacupari-mirim
- Garcinia brevipedicellata
- Garcinia burkillii
- Garcinia cadelliana
- Garcinia cantleyana
- Garcinia celebica L.
- Garcinia clusiifolia
- Garcinia costata
- Garcinia cowa - cowa mangosteen
- Garcinia decussata
- Garcinia diversifolia
- Garcinia dulcis – mundu, rata
- Garcinia echinocarpa
- Garcinia epunctata
- Garcinia eugeniaefolia
- Garcinia forbesii - rose kandis
- Garcinia gardneriana – bacupari
- Garcinia gummi-gutta – gambooge, garcinia cambogia, brindleberry, brindall berry, Malabar tamarind
- Garcinia hanburyi – Hanbury's garcinia
- Garcinia hendersoniana
- Garcinia hermonii
- Garcinia holttumii
- Garcinia hombroniana - seashore mangosteen
- Garcinia humilis – achachairú, achacha
- Garcinia imberti
- Garcinia indica – wild mangosteen, kokum
- Garcinia intermedia – lemon drop mangosteen, machare
- Garcinia kingii
- Garcinia kola – bitter kola
- Garcinia lateriflora – Kandis (Palawan)
- Garcinia leptophylla
- Garcinia linii
- Garcinia livingstonei – African mangosteen, Lowveld mangosteen, Livingstone's garcinia, imbe
- Garcinia loureiroi - (Khmer: សណ្ដាន់)
- Garcinia macrophylla – pungara
- Garcinia madruno (Kunth) Hammel – charichuelo
- Garcinia magnifolia – bebasajo
- Garcinia maingayi
- Garcinia mangostana – purple mangosteen
- Garcinia microcarpa
- Garcinia minutiflora
- Garcinia monantha
- Garcinia montana
- Garcinia morella – ireevalsinni (Tamil)
- Garcinia multiflora Champ. – dọc (Vietnamese)
- Garcinia murtonii
- Garcinia nigrolineata Planch. ex T.Anderson
- Garcinia nitida
- Garcinia oliveri
- Garcinia opaca
- Garcinia parvifolia - Kundong, Brunei cherry, Asam aur aur
- Garcinia paucinervis
- Garcinia pedunculata
- Garcinia prainiana – button mangosteen, cherapu
- Garcinia pseudoguttifera - mo'onia tree
- Garcinia pushpangadaniana
- Garcinia pyrifera
- Garcinia quaesita
- Garcinia rubro-echinata
- Garcinia scortechinii
- Garcinia semseii
- Garcinia sessilis Seem. – heilala (Tongan), seilala (Samoan)
- Garcinia spicata - bitter garcinia
- Garcinia staudtii
- Garcinia subelliptica - fukugi tree
- Garcinia terpnophylla
- Garcinia thwaitesii
- Garcinia travancorica
- Garcinia uniflora
- Garcinia warrenii F.Muell.
- Garcinia wightii
- Garcinia xanthochymus – yellow mangosteen, gamboge
- Garcinia zeylanica

== Genetic Diversity ==
The genetic diversity of 22 Garcinia accessions was analyzed using peroxidase, RAPD markers, and gene sequence-specific amplification polymorphism (GSSAP). Genetic diversity assessment revealed low genetic variation among them. Phylogenetic analysis indicated that Garcinia species clustered into five groups at a mean similarity coefficient of 0.54. This study showed that the G. magostana accessions can be clearly distinguished by combined peroxidase, RAPD, and gene sequence-specific amplification polymorphism.
