= Garcinia quaesita =

Conservation status
- Vulnerable (IUCN 2.3)

Scientific classification
- Kingdom: Plantae
- Clade: Tracheophytes
- Clade: Angiosperms
- Clade: Eudicots
- Clade: Rosids
- Order: Malpighiales
- Family: Clusiaceae
- Genus: Garcinia
- Species: G. quaesita

Binomial name
- Garcinia quaesita Pierre

Species of flowering plant

Garcinia quaesita is a species of flowering plant in the family Clusiaceae. It is a tree found only in Sri Lanka.

== Common names ==
- English: red mango, Indian tamarind, brindleberry
- Sinhala: kana goraka, honda goraka
- Tamil: korakkaipuli

== Etymology ==
The generic name is after L. Garcin (1683–1751)
