= Garcinia scortechinii =

Conservation status
- Least Concern (IUCN 3.1)

Scientific classification
- Kingdom: Plantae
- Clade: Tracheophytes
- Clade: Angiosperms
- Clade: Eudicots
- Clade: Rosids
- Order: Malpighiales
- Family: Clusiaceae
- Genus: Garcinia
- Species: G. scortechinii

Binomial name
- Garcinia scortechinii King

Species of tree

Garcinia scortechinii is a species of flowering plant in the family Clusiaceae. It is a tree found in Peninsular Malaysia and Singapore.
