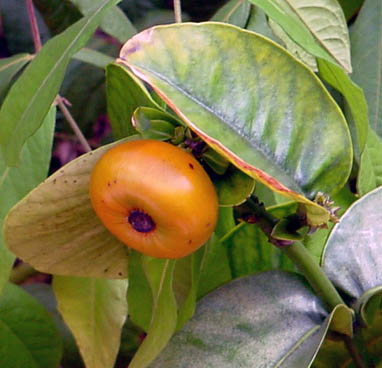

Conservation status
- Least Concern (IUCN 2.3)

Scientific classification
- Kingdom: Plantae
- Clade: Tracheophytes
- Clade: Angiosperms
- Clade: Eudicots
- Clade: Rosids
- Order: Malpighiales
- Family: Clusiaceae
- Genus: Garcinia
- Species: G. prainiana

Binomial name
- Garcinia prainiana King

= Garcinia prainiana =

Species of tree

Garcinia prainiana, known as the button mangosteen or cherapu, is a species of flowering plant in the family Clusiaceae. It is small or medium-sized tree which is native to Peninsular Malaysia and Peninsular Thailand. Its fruit has a flavor similar to its cousin, the purple mangosteen, with an interesting taste some have compared to a tangerine, but unlike its cousin it has a tissue-thin skin rather than a hard rind, making it much easier to eat out-of-hand. Also unlike the purple mangosteen, it can be grown in a container. The fruit is cultivated widely in Southeast Asia. In the United States, success has been found with its cultivation by a few backyard growers in South Florida and the Whitman Tropical Fruit Pavilion at Florida's Fairchild Tropical Botanic Garden.

It was featured in Malaysian 30 cents stamp in 1999.
