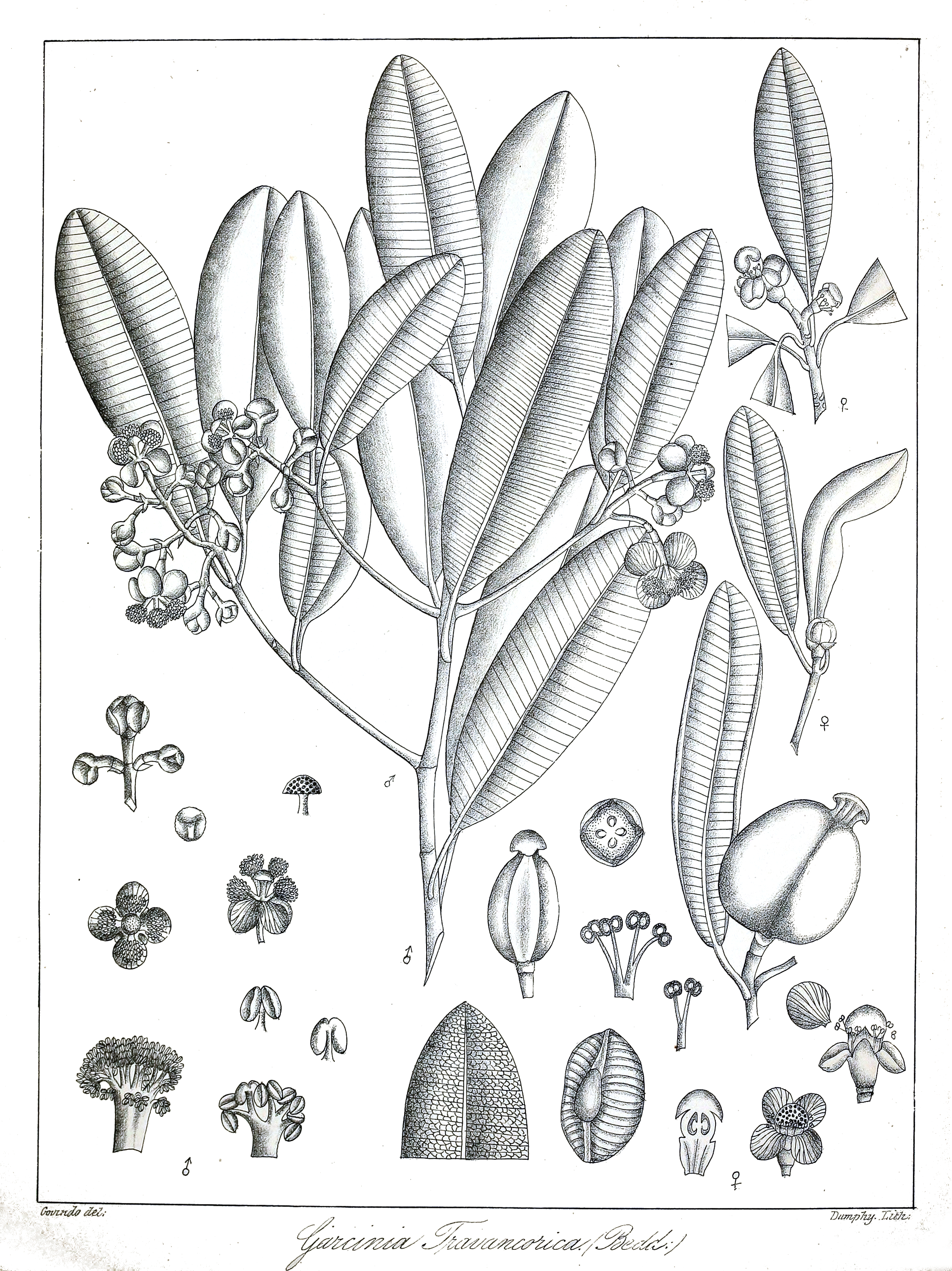

Conservation status
- Critically Endangered (IUCN 3.1)

Scientific classification
- Kingdom: Plantae
- Clade: Tracheophytes
- Clade: Angiosperms
- Clade: Eudicots
- Clade: Rosids
- Order: Malpighiales
- Family: Clusiaceae
- Genus: Garcinia
- Species: G. travancorica

Binomial name
- Garcinia travancorica Bedd.

= Garcinia travancorica =

Species of flowering plant

Garcinia travancorica is a species of flowering plant in the family Clusiaceae. It is found only in India. It is threatened by habitat loss.
