= Garcinia leptophylla =

Scientific classification
- Kingdom: Plantae
- Clade: Tracheophytes
- Clade: Angiosperms
- Clade: Eudicots
- Clade: Rosids
- Order: Malpighiales
- Family: Clusiaceae
- Genus: Garcinia
- Species: G. leptophylla

Binomial name
- Garcinia leptophylla Bittrich (2018)

Synonyms
- Rheedia longifolia Planch. & Triana; Rheedia longifolia var. subcordata Vesque

Species of plant

Garcinia leptophylla is an evergreen flowering tree in the family Clusiaceae (Guttiferae). The specific epithet (leptophylla) comes from Greek leptos (= slender, slim), and phyllon (= leaf), and refers to the plant's slender leaves.

== Distribution ==
It is native to Colombia, Bolivia, Peru, and northern Brazil.

== Description ==
It grows to 20 meters (66 feet) in height and the branches are glabrous and angular. The sap is yellow and the petioles measure 2–3.5 centimeters in length. The leaves are elliptic to lanceolate in shape and are very coriaceous, and the base is attenuate or cuneate and the margin is entire. The flowers occur in fascicles of approximately 40 and their pedicels measure 1.5–2.5 centimeters in length. They have four green petals which are lanceolate to oblanceolate in shape and measure 4–5 x 3–3.5 millimeters and have truncate bases. The fruit is smooth and is green when immature and measures 2–2.2 x 1.7–1.9 centimeters. Its pedicel measures 2.7–3.5 centimeters in length. It is a dioecious species but has been recorded to have some level of self-pollination.

== Uses ==
An extract from the leaves has been proven to induce an antinociceptive effect, and it is used in folk medicine in South America.

== See also ==
- List of Garcinia species
