= Garcinia kurzii =

Conservation status
- Endangered (IUCN 2.3)

Scientific classification
- Kingdom: Plantae
- Clade: Tracheophytes
- Clade: Angiosperms
- Clade: Eudicots
- Clade: Rosids
- Order: Malpighiales
- Family: Clusiaceae
- Genus: Garcinia
- Species: G. kurzii

Binomial name
- Garcinia kurzii Pierre

Synonyms
- Garcinia kingii Pierre ex Vesque

Species of flowering plant

Garcinia kingii is a species of flowering plant in the family Clusiaceae. It is a tree native to the Andaman and Nicobar islands. It is a small tree which grows in evergreen rain forest. It is threatened by habitat loss.

The species was described by Jean Baptiste Louis Pierre in 1883. Garcinia kingii Pierre ex Vesque is a synonym.
