= Garcinia pyrifera =

Conservation status
- Least Concern (IUCN 3.1)

Scientific classification
- Kingdom: Plantae
- Clade: Tracheophytes
- Clade: Angiosperms
- Clade: Eudicots
- Clade: Rosids
- Order: Malpighiales
- Family: Clusiaceae
- Genus: Garcinia
- Species: G. pyrifera

Binomial name
- Garcinia pyrifera Ridl.

Synonyms
- Garcinia densiflora King; Garcinia glomerata Vesque

Species of flowering plant

Garcinia pyrifera is a species of flowering plant in the family Clusiaceae. It is a tree native to Peninsular Malaysia and Singapore, which grows in lowland rain forest.
