= Garcinia microcarpa =

Scientific classification
- Kingdom: Plantae
- Clade: Tracheophytes
- Clade: Angiosperms
- Clade: Eudicots
- Clade: Rosids
- Order: Malpighiales
- Family: Clusiaceae
- Genus: Garcinia
- Species: G. microcarpa

Binomial name
- Garcinia microcarpa Pierre

Species of flowering plant

Garcinia microcarpa, also known as kandis hutan, is a species of flowering plant, a dioecious understorey fruit tree in the mangosteen family, that is native to Southeast Asia.

== Description ==
The tree grows to 10–20 m in height, with a 5–10 m bole, oozing yellowish latex when cut. The smooth oval leaves are 12–18 cm long by 6–8 cm wide. The inflorescences occur along the branches. The fruits are round berries, 3–3.5 cm by2.3–2.5 cm in diameter; the epicarp is greenish with pale brown patches, with white latex, enclosing 6–8 cream-coloured seeds covered with a translucent, sweet and edible arillode.

== Distribution and habitat ==
The species is endemic to Borneo, where it is found in Sabah and Sarawak in lowland and hill mixed dipterocarp forest up to an elevation of 900 m.
