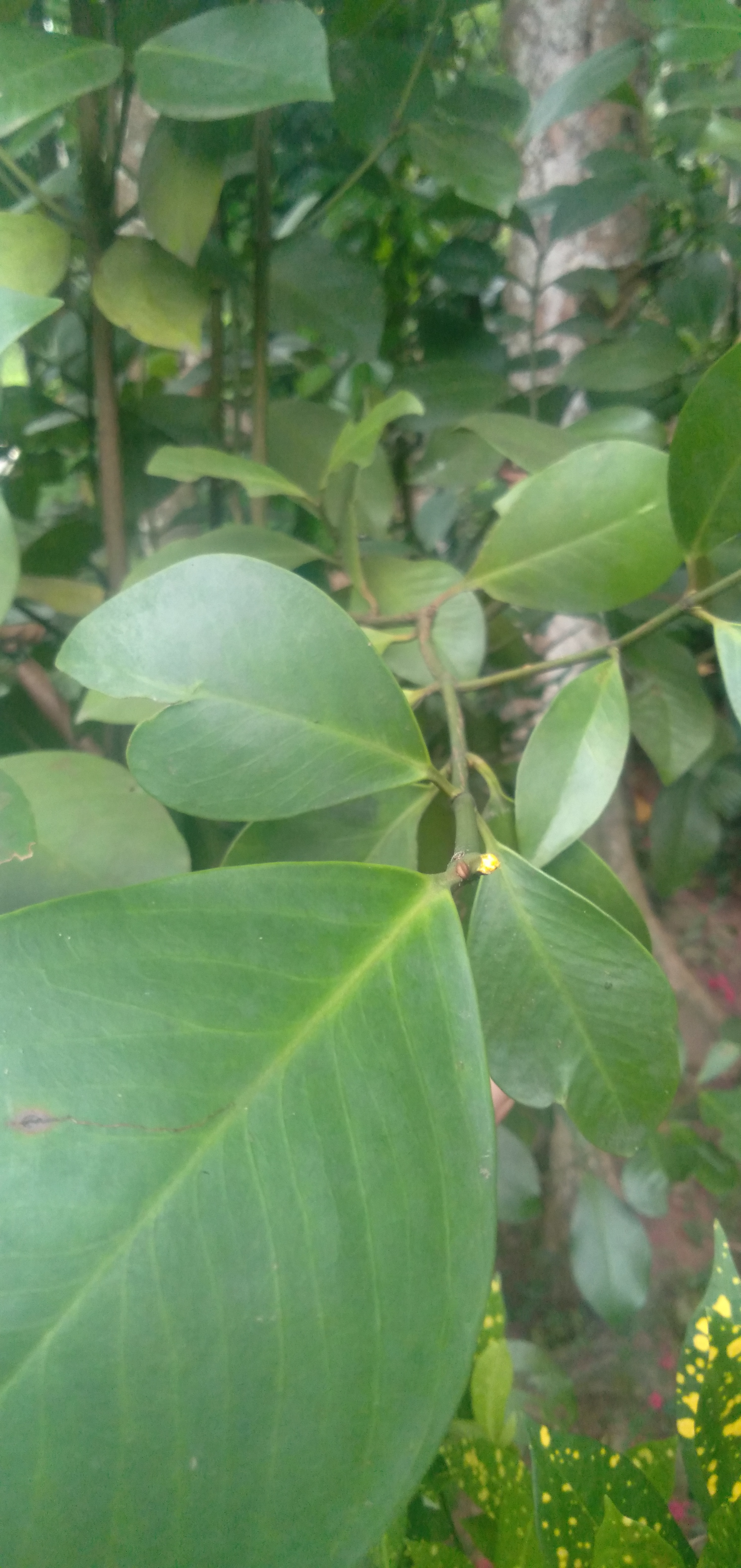

Scientific classification
- Kingdom: Plantae
- Clade: Tracheophytes
- Clade: Angiosperms
- Clade: Eudicots
- Clade: Rosids
- Order: Malpighiales
- Family: Clusiaceae
- Genus: Garcinia
- Species: G. terpnophylla

Binomial name
- Garcinia terpnophylla Thwaites

Synonyms
- Discostigma acuminatum Planch. & Triana; Discostigma zeylanicum Planch. & Triana

= Garcinia terpnophylla =

Species of flowering plant

Garcinia terpnophylla is a species of flowering plant in the Clusiaceae. It is found only in Sri Lanka where it is known as කොකටිය (kokatiya) and රන් කිරි ගොකටු (ran kiri gokatu) in Sinhala.

== Varieties ==
- Garcinia terpnophylla var. terpnophylla.
- Garcinia terpnophylla var. acuminate.
