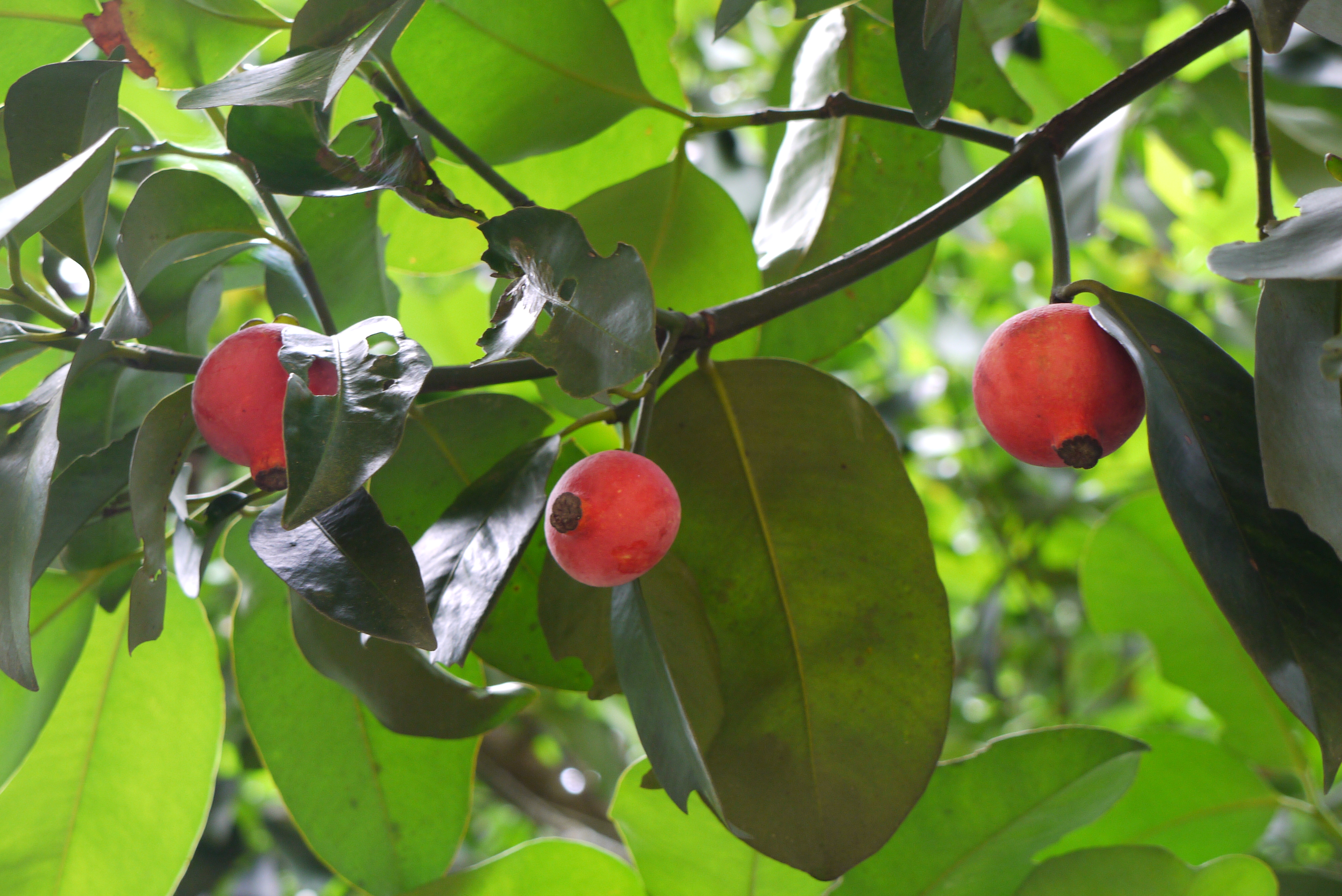

Scientific classification
- Kingdom: Plantae
- Clade: Tracheophytes
- Clade: Angiosperms
- Clade: Eudicots
- Clade: Rosids
- Order: Malpighiales
- Family: Clusiaceae
- Genus: Garcinia
- Species: G. hombroniana

Binomial name
- Garcinia hombroniana Pierre 1883

= Garcinia hombroniana =

Species of fruit and plant

Garcinia hombroniana or Seashore Mangosteen is a species of mangosteen found in Malaysia, Cambodia, Thailand and Vietnam in coastal forest.

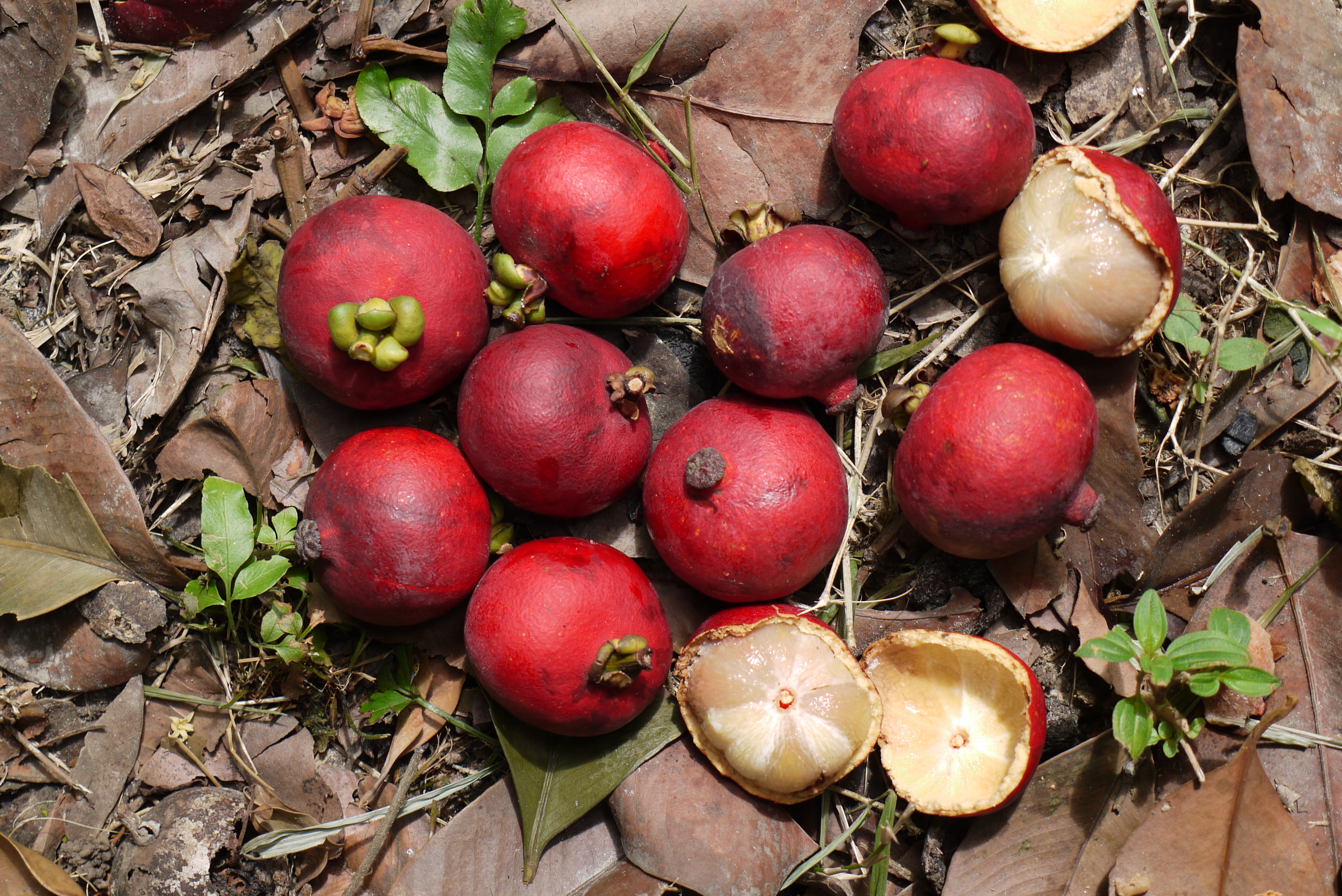
Fruits

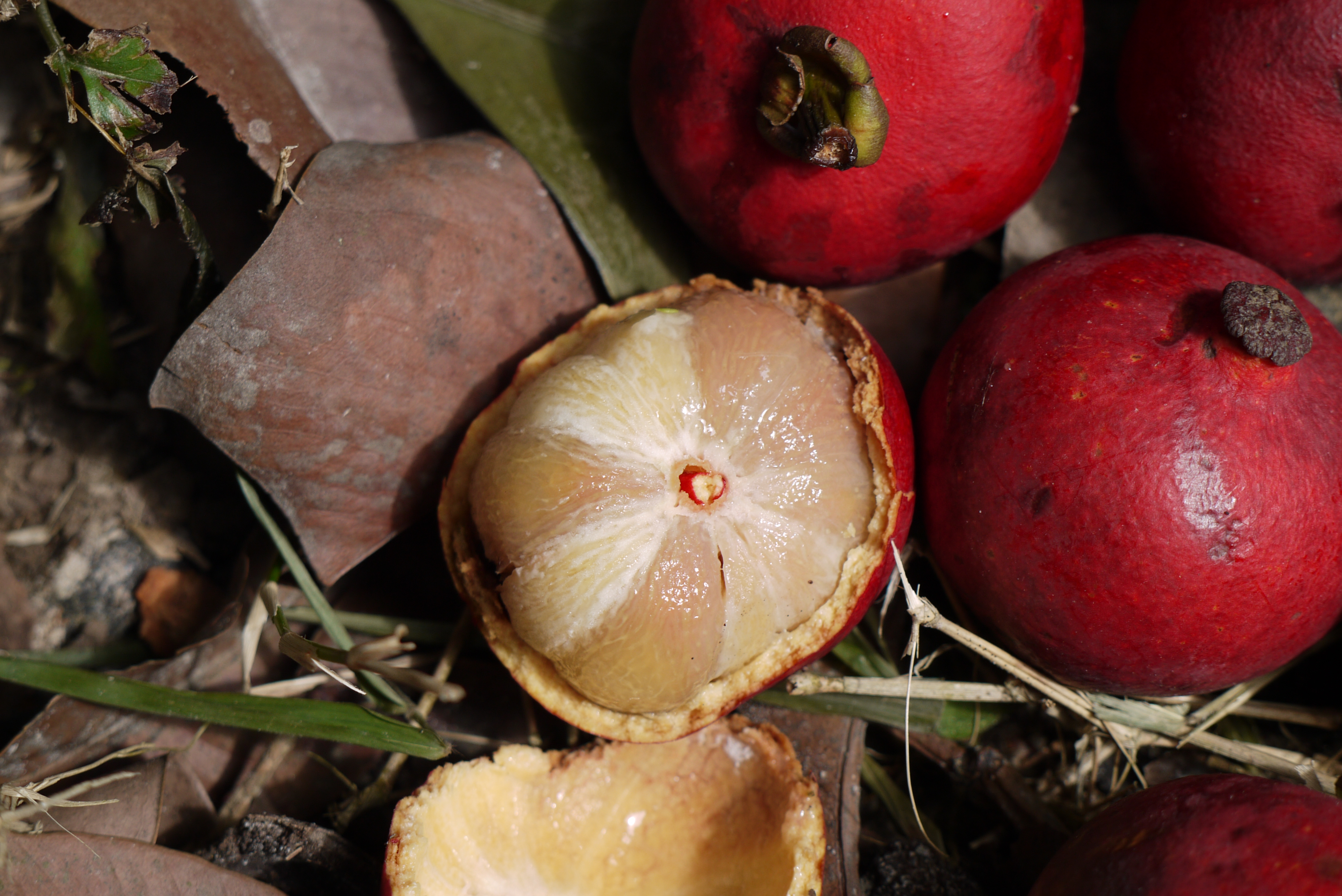
Fruit

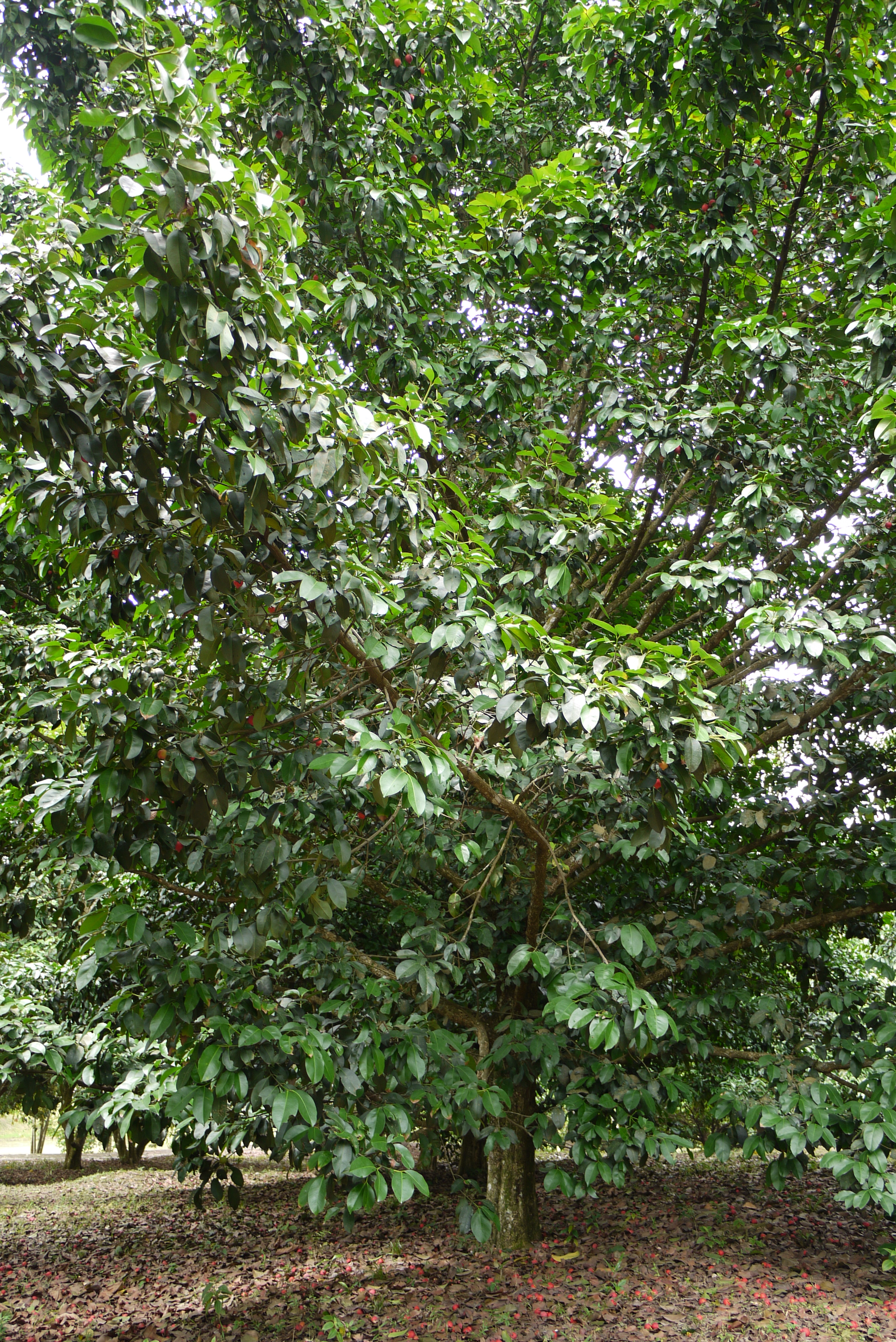
Tree
