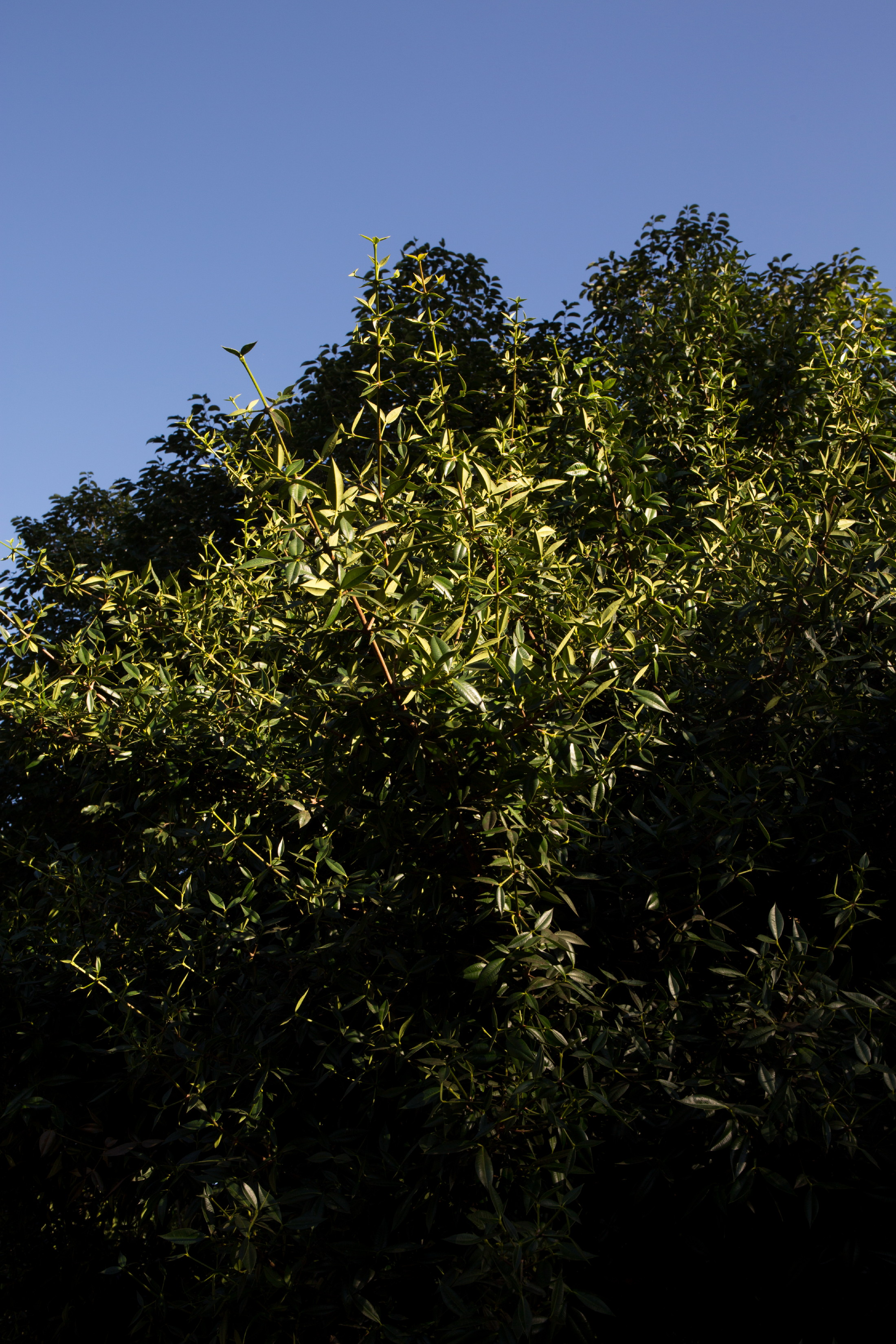
- Garcinia aristata in the Cupaynicú Botanical Garden, Cuba

Conservation status
- Least Concern (IUCN 3.1)

Scientific classification
- Kingdom: Plantae
- Clade: Tracheophytes
- Clade: Angiosperms
- Clade: Eudicots
- Clade: Rosids
- Order: Malpighiales
- Family: Clusiaceae
- Genus: Garcinia
- Species: G. aristata

Binomial name
- Garcinia aristata (Griseb.) Borhidi

Synonyms
- Rheedia aristata Griseb.

= Garcinia aristata =

Species of flowering plant

Garcinia aristata is a species of flowering plant in the family Clusiaceae. It is native to Cuba, and possibly Hispaniola and Puerto Rico. It is threatened by habitat loss.
