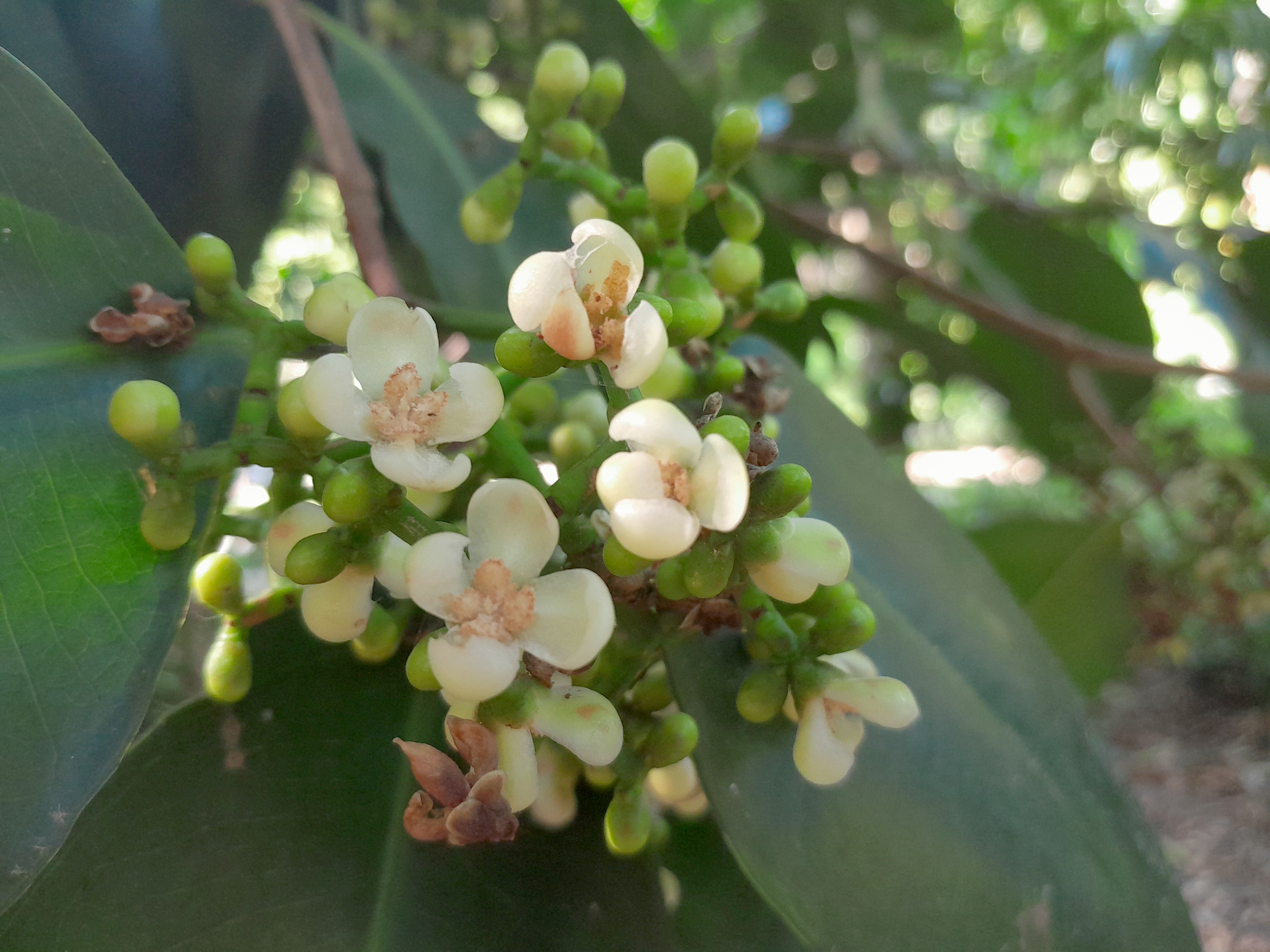
- Native mangosteen in flower

Conservation status
- Least Concern (IUCN 3.1)

Scientific classification
- Kingdom: Plantae
- Clade: Embryophytes
- Clade: Tracheophytes
- Clade: Spermatophytes
- Clade: Angiosperms
- Clade: Eudicots
- Clade: Rosids
- Order: Malpighiales
- Family: Clusiaceae
- Genus: Garcinia
- Species: G. warrenii

Binomial name
- Garcinia warrenii F.Muell. (1891)

Synonyms
- Garcinia kajewskii C.T.White

= Garcinia warrenii =

Fruit tree

Garcinia warrenii, commonly known as native mangosteen or Warren's mangosteen, a is a fruit-bearing tree up to 15 metres in height of the mangosteen family Clusiaceae. It is found in the tropical rainforests of northern and north-eastern Australia and New Guinea. The genus Garcinia includes about 200 species found in the Old World tropics, mostly in Asia and Africa. Garcinia warrenii is indigenous to New Guinea, the Torres Strait Islands, northeastern Queensland from Cape York Peninsula south to Babinda, and a small, isolated population on Melville Island in the Northern Territory, Australia.

Garcinia warrenii is found in rain forest, littoral rainforest and riparian forest from 0 to 780 m.

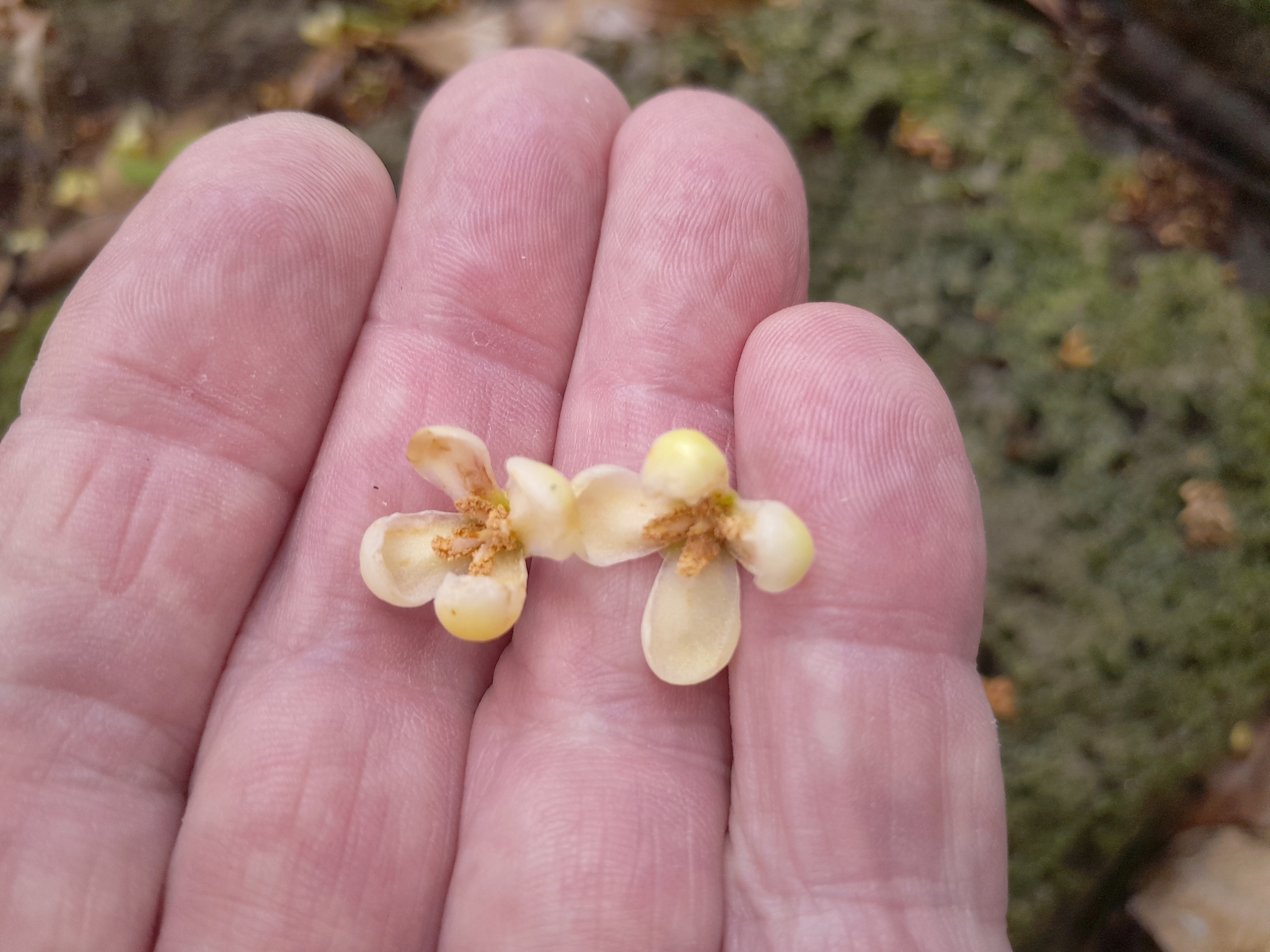
Male flowers

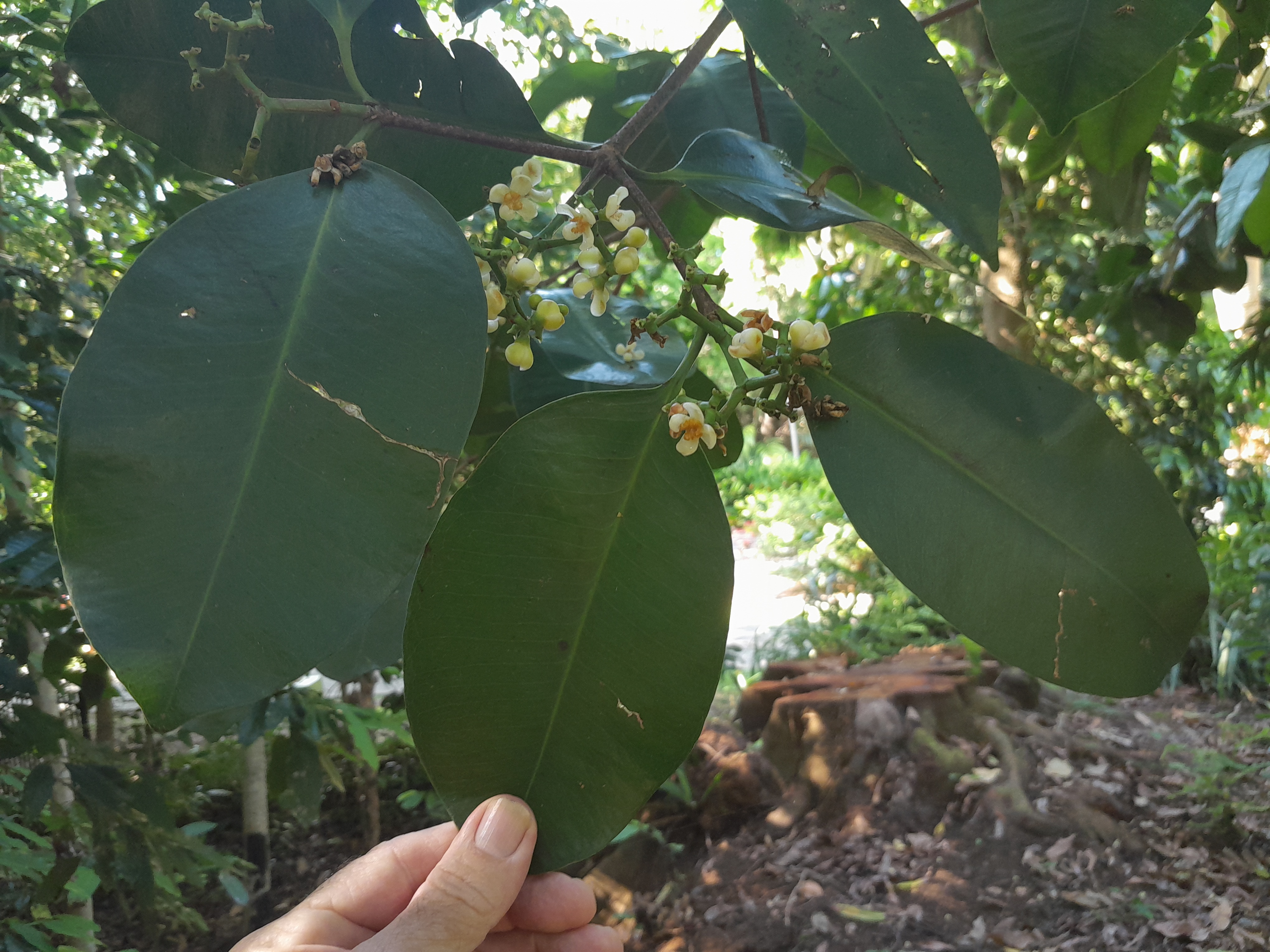
Foliage

== Uses ==
There are five species of native Garcinia in north Queensland forests but Garcinia warrenii is the only edible one. While the fruits are edible, they are not widely sought after.

== Description ==
Garcinia warrenii is a close relative of the mangosteen (Garcinia mangostana). This bushy small tree grows up to 15 metres high, they grow straight up and are often difficult to see in the forest. It has fragrant white flowers and purple sweet edible fruit. The thick, leathery leaves are often stained with mould or lichens. Broken petioles (leaf stalks) and twigs produce a sticky yellow exudate. Leaf blades are about 10 to 16 x 48 cm. The fruit are eaten by Pteropus (fruit bats).
