= Garcinia hendersoniana =

Conservation status
- Least Concern (IUCN 2.3)

Scientific classification
- Kingdom: Plantae
- Clade: Tracheophytes
- Clade: Angiosperms
- Clade: Eudicots
- Clade: Rosids
- Order: Malpighiales
- Family: Clusiaceae
- Genus: Garcinia
- Species: G. hendersoniana

Binomial name
- Garcinia hendersoniana Whitm.

Species of tree

Garcinia hendersoniana is a species of flowering plant in the family Clusiaceae. It is a tree endemic to Peninsular Malaysia.
