= Garcinia brevirostris =

Conservation status
- Least Concern (IUCN 3.1)

Scientific classification
- Kingdom: Plantae
- Clade: Tracheophytes
- Clade: Angiosperms
- Clade: Eudicots
- Clade: Rosids
- Order: Malpighiales
- Family: Clusiaceae
- Genus: Garcinia
- Species: G. brevirostris

Binomial name
- Garcinia brevirostris Scheff.

Synonyms
- Garcinia eugeniifolia Wall. ex T.Anderson; Garcinia gitingensis Elmer

Species of flowering plant

Garcinia brevirostris is a species of flowering plant in the family Clusiaceae. It is a tree native to Peninsular Malaysia, Singapore, Sumatra, and the Philippines. It grows in lowland rain forests.
