= Garcinia decussata =

Conservation status
- Vulnerable (IUCN 2.3)

Scientific classification
- Kingdom: Plantae
- Clade: Tracheophytes
- Clade: Angiosperms
- Clade: Eudicots
- Clade: Rosids
- Order: Malpighiales
- Family: Clusiaceae
- Genus: Garcinia
- Species: G. decussata

Binomial name
- Garcinia decussata C.D.Adams

Species of flowering plant

Garcinia decussata also known as the "hat stand tree" is a species of flowering plant in the family Clusiaceae. A relative of the mangosteen, it is a shrub or small tree less than 3 m in height. This plant, found only in Jamaica, is being researched the University of the West Indies for possible use in the treatment of HIV/AIDS. It is threatened by habitat loss though it can still be found in areas of the John Crow Mountains.
