= Garcinia wightii =

Conservation status
- Endangered (IUCN 3.1)

Scientific classification
- Kingdom: Plantae
- Clade: Tracheophytes
- Clade: Angiosperms
- Clade: Eudicots
- Clade: Rosids
- Order: Malpighiales
- Family: Clusiaceae
- Genus: Garcinia
- Species: G. wightii

Binomial name
- Garcinia wightii T.Anderson

Species of flowering plant

Garcinia wightii is a species of flowering plant in the family Clusiaceae. It is a tree native to the Western Ghats of Kerala state in southwestern India. It grows in lowland tropical moist forest in scattered locations in the Anamalai Hills at about 700 meters elevation.
