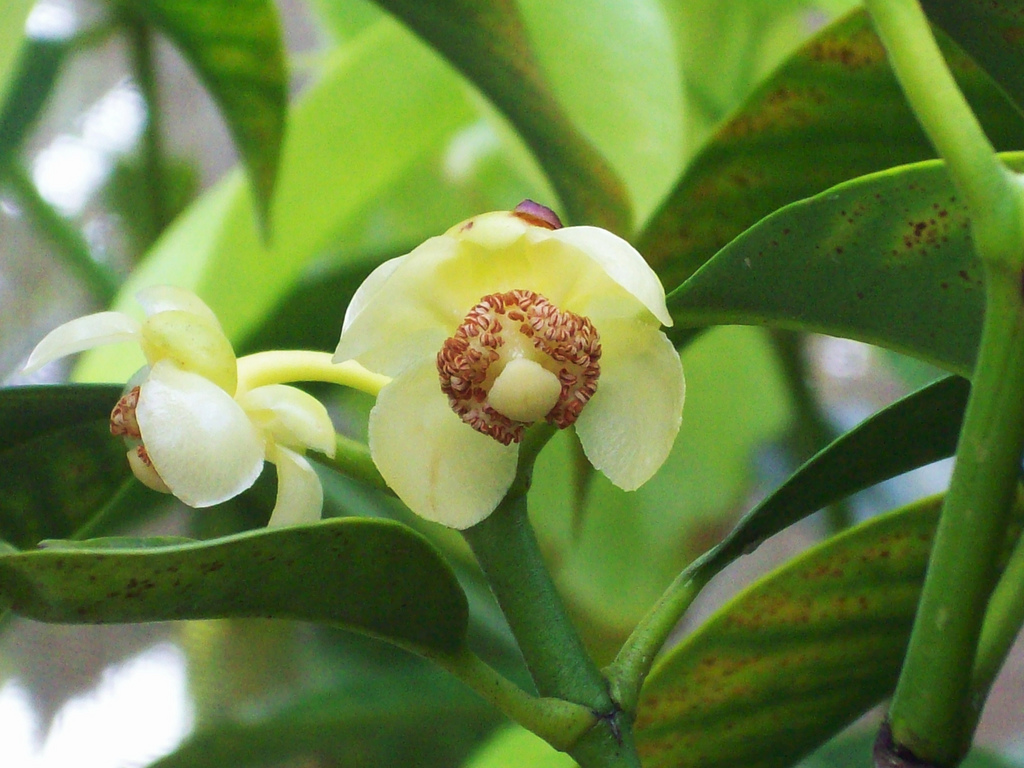

Conservation status
- Least Concern (IUCN 3.1)

Scientific classification
- Kingdom: Plantae
- Clade: Tracheophytes
- Clade: Angiosperms
- Clade: Eudicots
- Clade: Rosids
- Order: Malpighiales
- Family: Clusiaceae
- Genus: Garcinia
- Species: G. macrophylla

Binomial name
- Garcinia macrophylla Mart.

Synonyms
- Garcinia megaphylla Verdc.; Rheedia macrantha Standl. & Steyerm.; Rheedia macrophylla (Mart.) Planch. & Triana; Rheedia macrophylla var. benthamiana Vesque

= Garcinia macrophylla =

Species of flowering plant

Garcinia macrophylla, common name pungara, is a species of tree found in southern Mexico, Guatemala, and tropical South America. It grows in the Amazonian and Atlantic lowland rain forests at elevations of 50–400 m, in climates with mean annual temperatures of 26–28 °C and mean annual rainfall of 1,500–4,000 mm. In Bolivia, this species is intercropped with cocoa for their edible fruits and shade.
