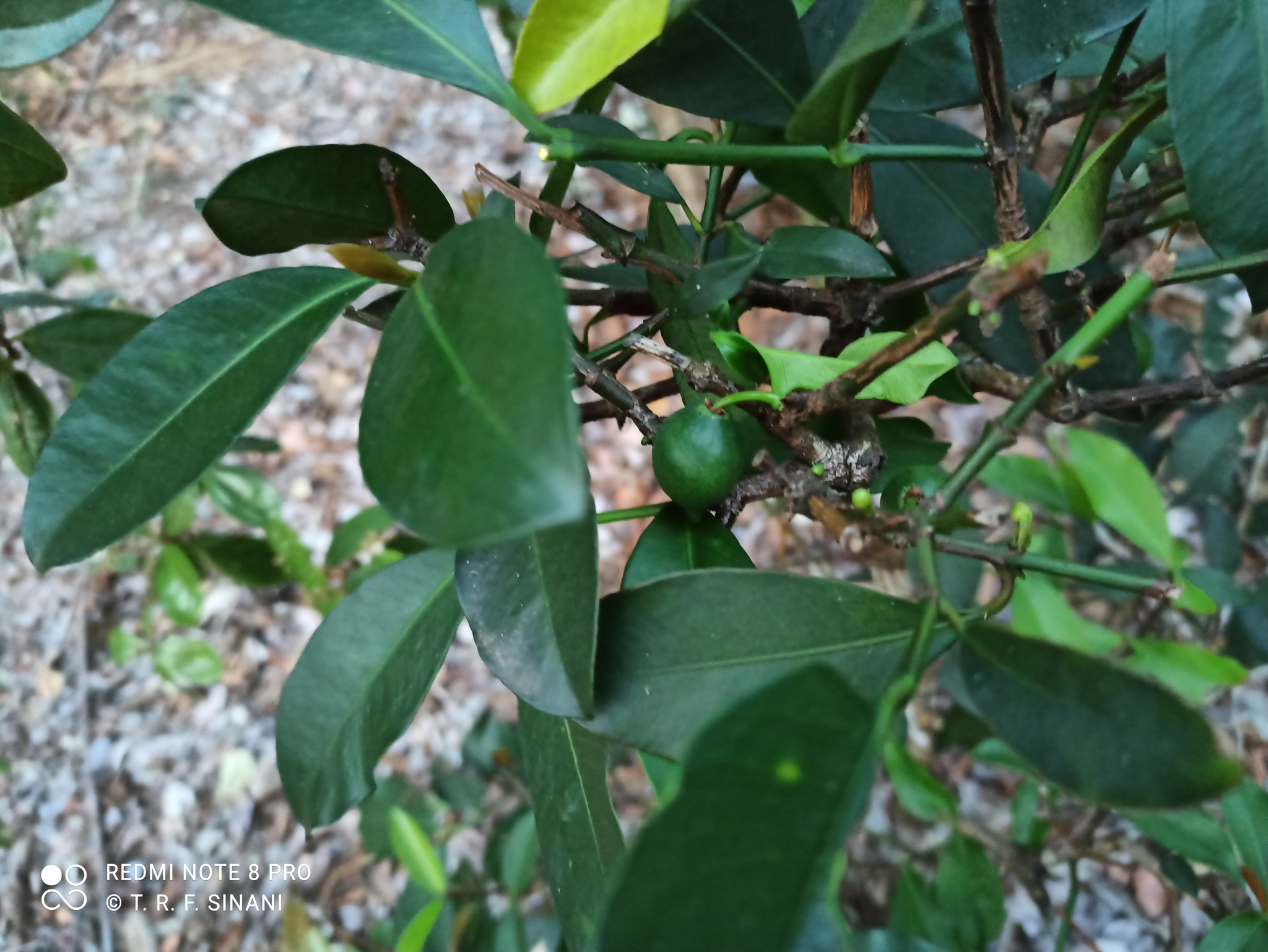

Conservation status
- Least Concern (IUCN 3.1)

Scientific classification
- Kingdom: Plantae
- Clade: Tracheophytes
- Clade: Angiosperms
- Clade: Eudicots
- Clade: Rosids
- Order: Malpighiales
- Family: Clusiaceae
- Genus: Garcinia
- Species: G. brasiliensis

Binomial name
- Garcinia brasiliensis Mart.

Synonyms
- Rheedia brasiliensis (Mart.) Planch. & Triana; Garcinia brasiliensis var. parvifolia Mart.; Rheedia brasiliensis var. salicifolia Chodat & Hassl.

= Garcinia brasiliensis =

Species of flowering plant

Garcinia brasiliensis is a species of plant in the mangosteen family Clusiaceae. It is native to Espírito Santo and Rio de Janeiro states in southeastern Brazil, where it grows in lowland tropical moist forest.
