= Garcinia paucinervis =

Conservation status
- Endangered (IUCN 2.3)

Scientific classification
- Kingdom: Plantae
- Clade: Tracheophytes
- Clade: Angiosperms
- Clade: Eudicots
- Clade: Rosids
- Order: Malpighiales
- Family: Clusiaceae
- Genus: Garcinia
- Species: G. paucinervis

Binomial name
- Garcinia paucinervis Chun & How

Species of tree

Garcinia paucinervis is a species of flowering plant in the family Clusiaceae. It is a tree found in China and Vietnam. It is threatened by habitat loss.
