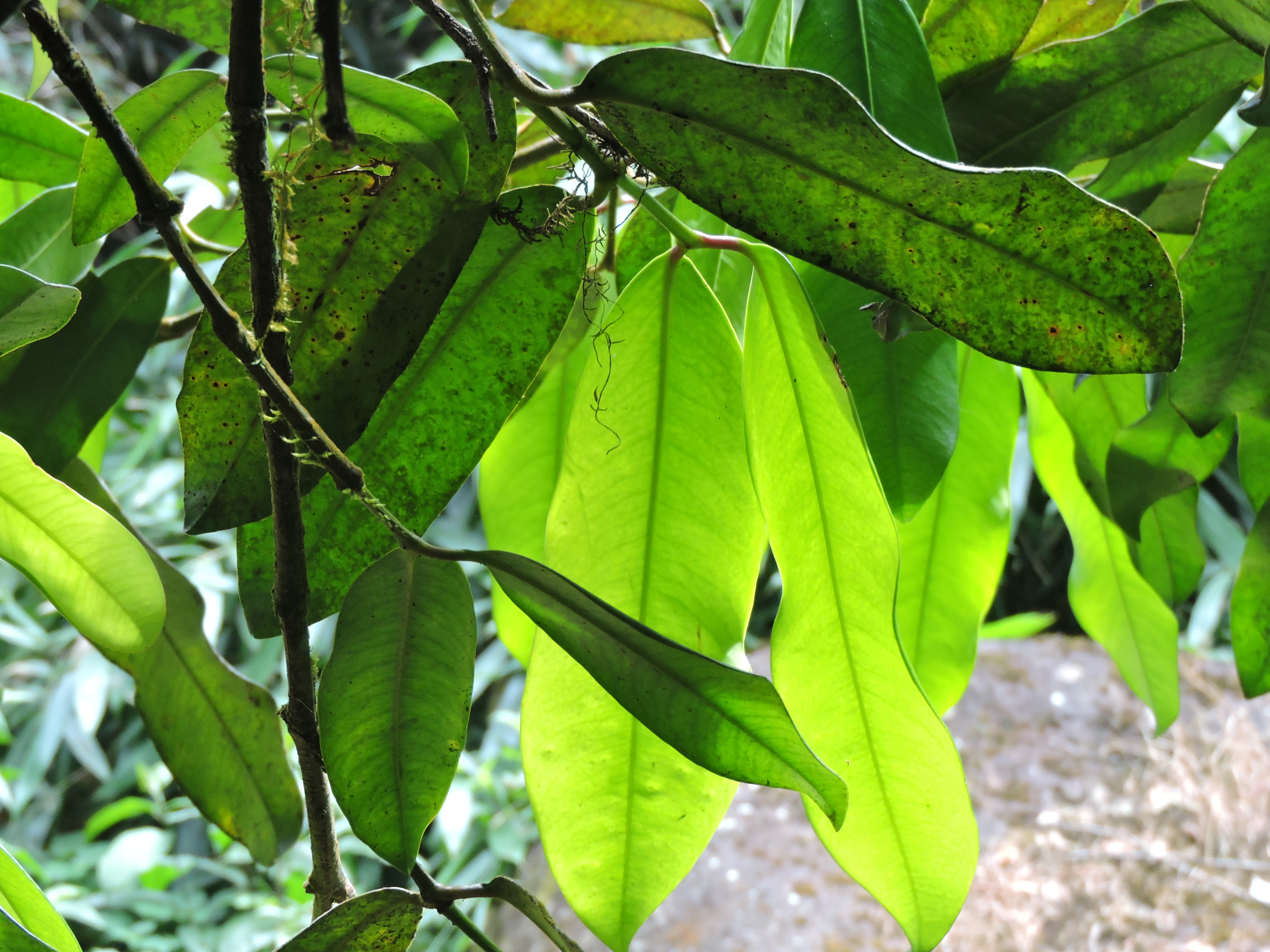

Scientific classification
- Kingdom: Plantae
- Clade: Tracheophytes
- Clade: Angiosperms
- Clade: Eudicots
- Clade: Rosids
- Order: Malpighiales
- Family: Clusiaceae
- Genus: Garcinia
- Species: G. pushpangadaniana

Binomial name
- Garcinia pushpangadaniana T.Sabu, N.Mohanan, Krishnaraj & Shareef

= Garcinia pushpangadaniana =

Species of flowering plant

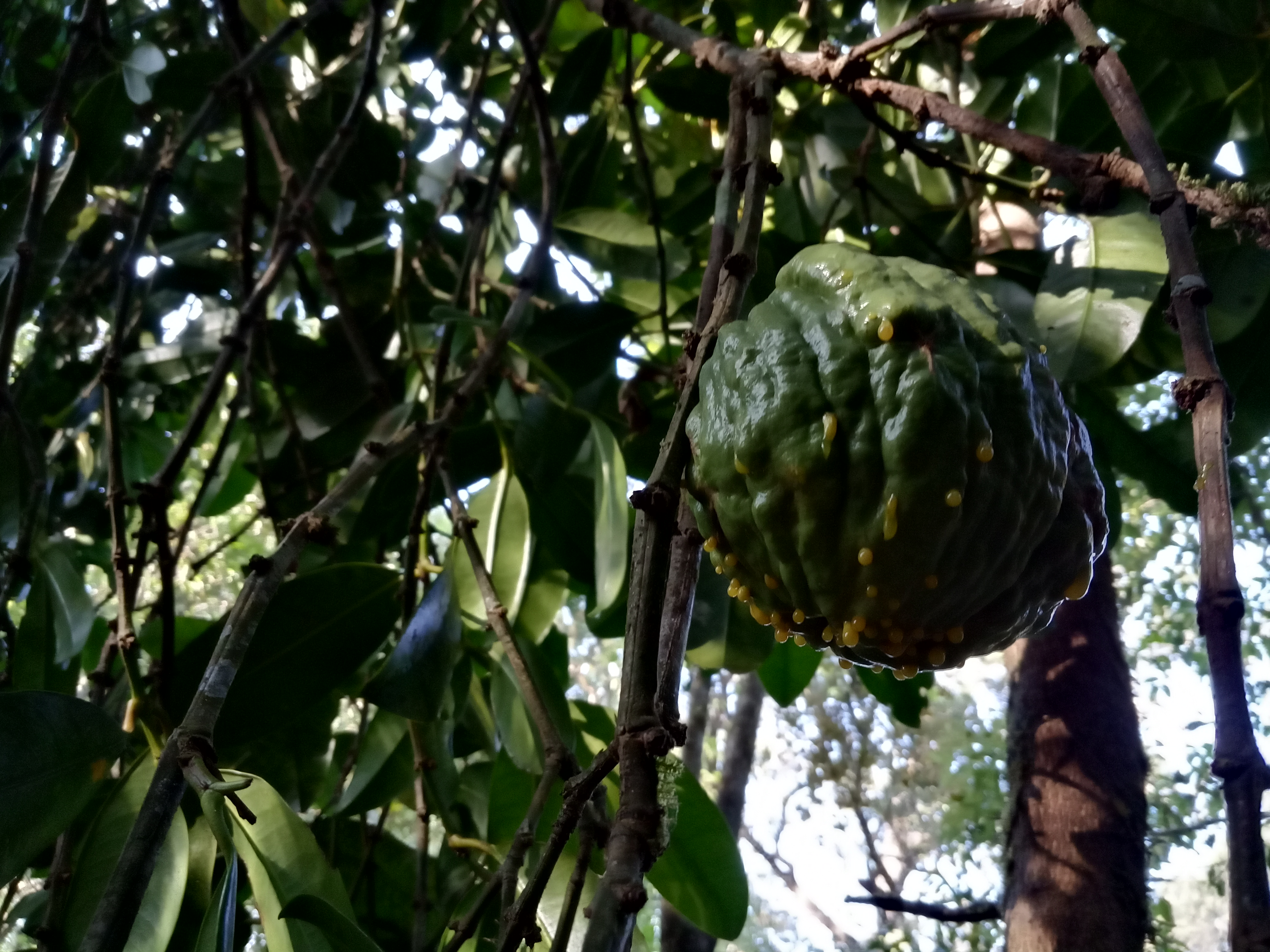
Fruit of G. pushpagadaniana seen in Erachiparai forest, Anamalai hills

Garcinia pushpangadaniana is a tree species in the family Clusiaceae. It was described in 2013 from a population found in the southern part of the Western Ghats in India. The specific epithet of this species honors Dr. P. Pushpangadan, former Director of Jawaharlal Nehru Tropical Botanical Garden & Research Institute.

== Description ==
They are large trees almost 20 m tall, with pyramidal crown; Branchlets are tetragonous with dark brown colour. The latex of the species is milky and the whole plant is glabrous except for the sepal and petal margins. Leaves are 14–20 × 6–8 cm, elliptic-oblong shaped, coriaceous, base rounded, margin subrepand, acute or obtuse at apex, dark green above, and light green below. The leaves have about 30–34 pairs of lateral nerves, the petiole is 1.5–2 cm long and quadrangular; and stipules are intrapetiolar. Flowers are pinkish-white in colour. Fruit size is almost 12 × 11 cm, arranged perpendicular to the axis at maturity. Fruits are fleshy, without any pulp, and irregularly ridged on the surface. It is symmetric and pale brown with a distinct papilla at apex. The seeds are plano-convex in shape, smooth or rugose, and whitish-yellow colour. The size is 2 × 1 cm with light brown and papery seed coat.

Earlier this species was mistakenly recorded as Garcinia xanthochymaus in various flora assessments. Morphologically, it differs from G. xanthochymaus in the following aspects: The latex of this species remain white on exposure while of Garcinia xanthochymaus will turn yellow. G. pushpangadaniana have a shorter pedicel of female flower, peltate staminoides, ovary with 6-8 locules and 6-8 lobed stigma compared to Garcinia xanthochymaus. The irregular ridges in the fruit is also a distinguishing feature.

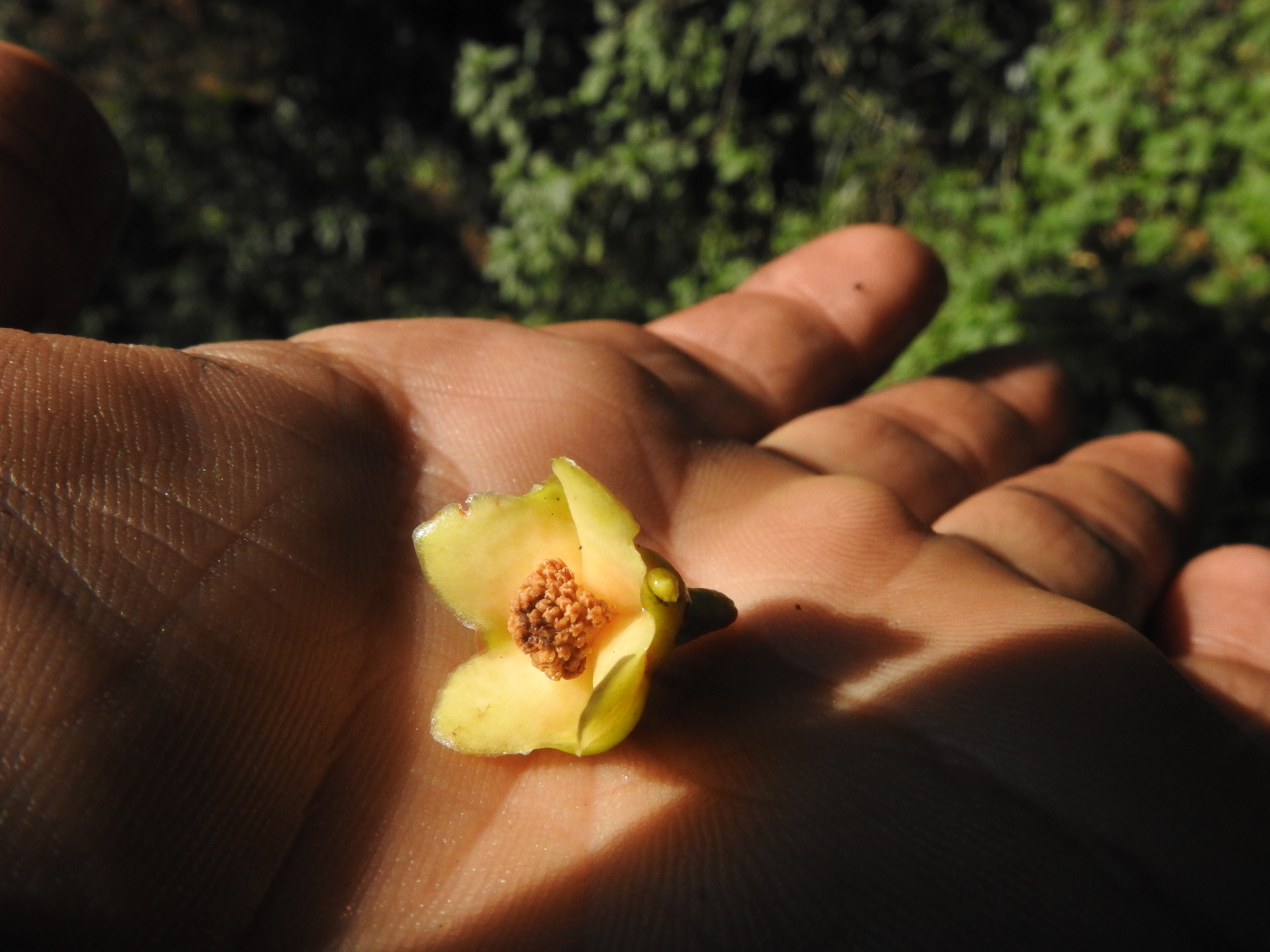
Flower of G. pushpangadaniana

== Distribution ==
This species is endemic to the semi-evergreen forests of the Southern Western Ghats of Kerala (Thiruvananthapuram, Idukki and Wayanadu districts) and Tamil Nadu (Coimbatore district) in elevations between 850 and 1400 m. It was first described from Kadalar area in Idukki district of Kerala. It has been recorded from Kadalar, Pampadumchola, Munnar (Idukki), Wallakad of Silent Valley (Palakkad) and from Anamalai Hills of Tamil Nadu

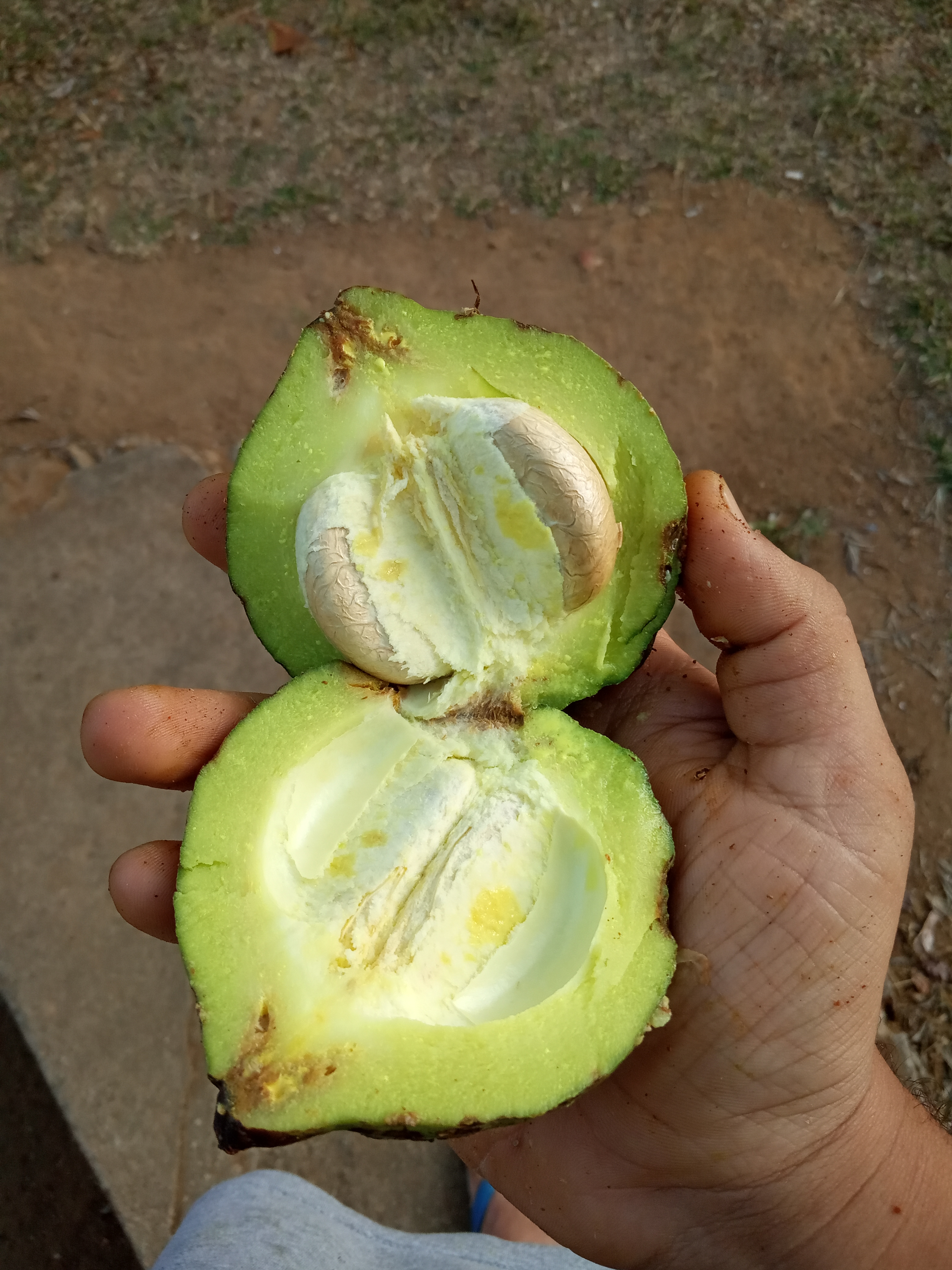
Locules of a fruit of this species

== Phenology ==
The flowering and fruiting of this species occurs in May- December.

== Ecology ==
In its type locality, the species was found in the second storey along with Cullenia exarillata, Syzygium hemisphericum, Palaquium ellipticum, and Elaeocarpus munroi.

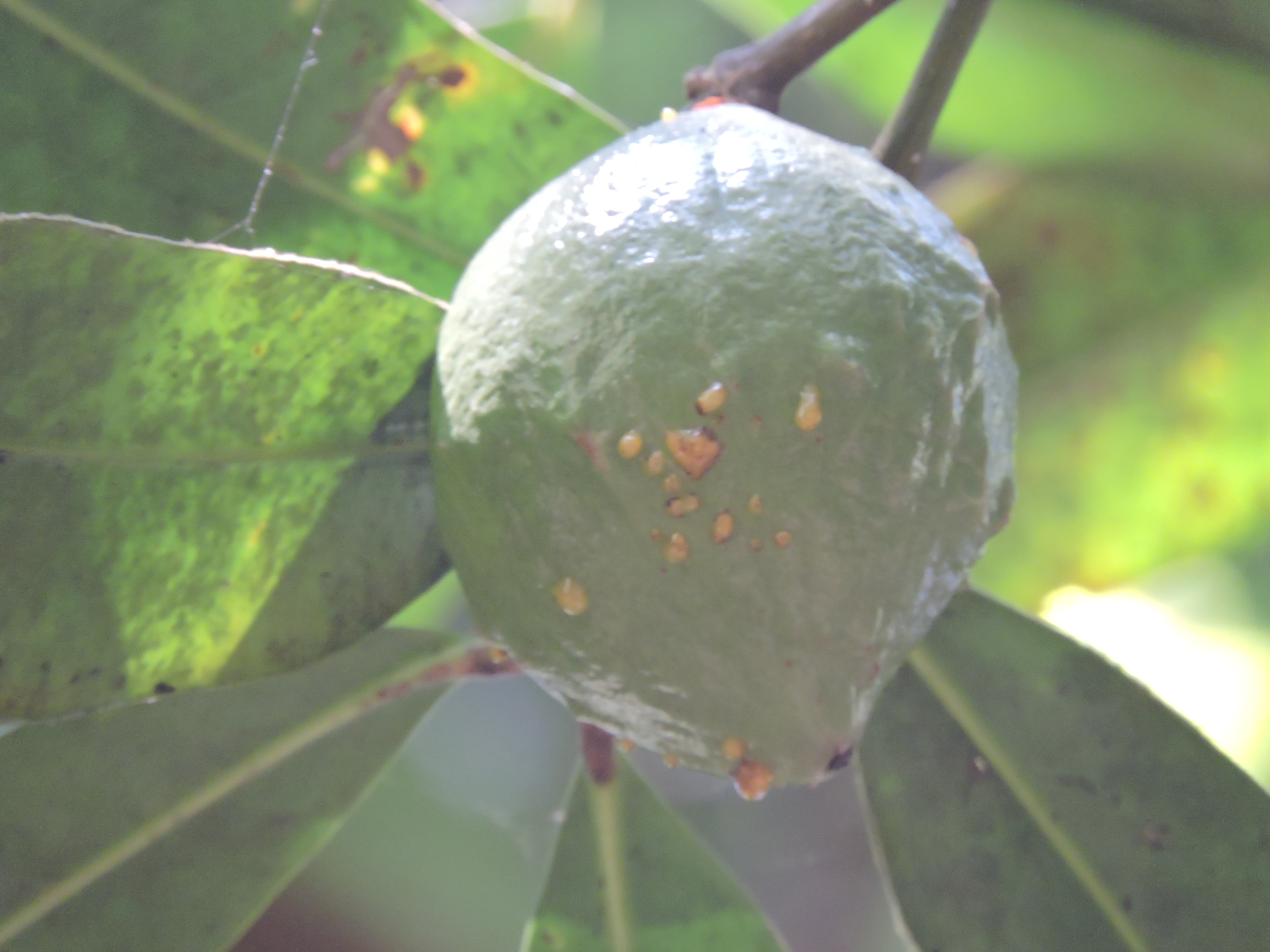
Fruit with yellow exudation
