= List of Clusiaceae genera =

Delineation of plant family Clusiaceae, and the subdivisions within the family, have been much revised over the past few decades.

== Accepted genera ==
18 genera are currently accepted:

- Arawakia L.Marinho
- Chrysochlamys Poepp.
- Clusia Plum. ex L.
- Dystovomita (Engl.) D'Arcy
- Garcinia L.
- Havetiopsis Planch. & Triana
- Lebrunia Staner
- Lorostemon Ducke
- Montrouziera Pancher ex Planch. & Triana
- Moronobea Aubl.
- Nouhuysia Lauterb.
- Pentadesma Sabine
- Platonia Mart.
- Quapoya Aubl.
- Symphonia L.f.
- Thysanostemon Maguire
- Tovomita Aubl.
- Tovomitopsis Planch. & Triana

== Classification ==
The family Clusiaceae was divided by Cronquist into 2 subfamilies: the Clusioideae (typical subfamily) and the Hypericoideae. The latter was often treated as a family - the Hypericaceae or St. John's wort family. Elements of the Hypericoideae are more common in North temperate areas and those of the Clusioideae are centered in the Tropics.

Later classifications however divide the family in a finer way. The taxonomy below mostly follows that of Stevens. Molecular studies have shown that the family Podostemaceae - the riverweeds - as well as the Theaceae-segregate Bonnetiaceae need to be included in this group. Their inclusions make Clusiaceae in a wide-sense polyphyletic, and Stevens's subfamilies need to be recognised at family level: Clusioideae as Clusiaceae sensu stricto; Hypericoideae as Hypericaceae; and Kielmeyeroideae as Calophyllaceae.

=== Subfamily Clusioideae ===
Synonyms are in parentheses:

Tribe Clusieae

- Arawakia L.Marinho
- Chrysochlamys Poepp. (Balboa Planch. & Triana, Commirhoea Miers, and Poecilostemon Triana & Planch.)
- Clusia (Androstylium, Cochlanthera, Decaphalangium, Havetia, Havetiopsis, Oedematopus, Oxystemon, Pilosperma, Quapoya, Renggeria, Rengifa, etc.)
- Dystovomita (Engl.) D’Arcy
- Tovomita Aubl. (Beauharnoisia Ruiz & Pav., Euthales F.Dietr. Marialva Vand., Micranthera Choisy, and Tovomitidium Ducke)
- Tovomitopsis Planch. & Triana (Bertolonia Spreng.)

Tribe Garcinieae

- Garcinia (Allanblackia, Brindonia, Cambogia, Clusianthemum, Mangostana, Oxycarpus, Pentaphalangium, Rheedia, Septogarcinia, Tripetalum, Tsimatimia, Verticillaria, Xanthochymus) - saptree, mangosteen

Tribe Moronobeeae

- Moronobea

Tribe Platonieae

- Platonia (Aristoclesia)

Tribe Symphonieae

- Lorostemon
- Pentadesma
- Montrouziera
- Symphonia (Actinostigma Welw., Aneuriscus C.Presl, Chrysopia Noronha ex Thouars)
- Thysanostemon

Tribe incertae sedis

- Havetiopsis Planch. & Triana
- Lebrunia Staner
- †Mammeoxylon
- Nouhuysia Lauterb.
- Quapoya Aubl.

=== Subfamily Hypericoideae ===
This subfamily comprises 3 tribes; synonyms are in parentheses:

Tribe Cratoxyleae

Cratoxylum (Cratoxylon)
Eliea (Eliaea)
Thornea
Triadenum - marsh St. Johnswort

Tribe Hypericeae

Hypericum (Adenotrias, Androsaemum, Androsemum, Ascyrum, Lianthus, Olympia, Sanidophyllum, Sarothra, Takasagoya, Triadenia) - St John's Wort
Santomasia

Tribe Vismieae

Harungana (Haronga)
Psorospermum
Vismia

=== Subfamily Kielmeyeroideae ===
This subfamily comprises 2 tribes:

Tribe Calophylleae (12 genera)

Calophyllum
Caraipa
Clusiella (Asthotheca, Astrotheca)
Haploclathra
Kayea
Kielmeyera
Mahurea
Mammea (Ochrocarpos, Paramammea) - mammee apple (sometimes put in Garcinieae)
Marila
Mesua (Vidalia)
Neotatea
Poeciloneuron

Tribe Endodesmieae (contains 2 African monotypic genera)

Endodesmia
Lebrunia

== Bibliography ==
- van Rijckevorsel, Paul (November 2002). "(1564) Proposal to Conserve the Name Platonia insignis against Moronobea esculenta (Guttiferae)". Taxon. 51 (4): 813–815. doi:10.2307/1555050. JSTOR 1555050.
