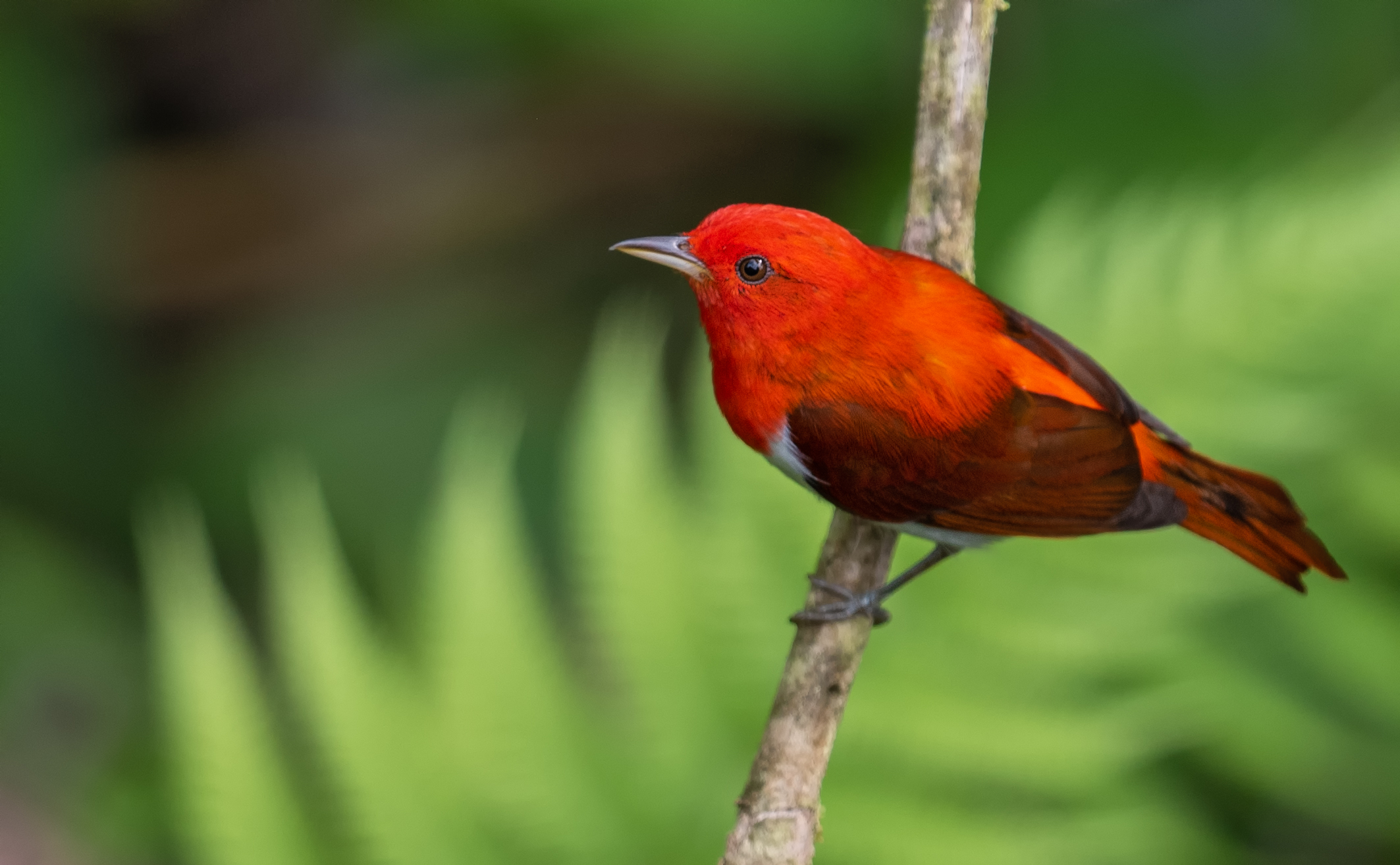
- Male

Conservation status
- Least Concern (IUCN 3.1)

Scientific classification
- Kingdom: Animalia
- Phylum: Chordata
- Class: Aves
- Order: Passeriformes
- Family: Thraupidae
- Genus: Chrysothlypis
- Species: C. salmoni

Binomial name
- Chrysothlypis salmoni (Sclater, PL, 1886)

Audio
- Song of a pair of scarlet-and-white tanagers

= Scarlet-and-white tanager =

Species of bird from South America

The scarlet-and-white tanager (Chrysothlypis salmoni) is a species of bird in the family Thraupidae. It is found in Colombia and northern Ecuador. Its natural habitats are subtropical or tropical moist lowland forests and heavily degraded former forest. The male is highly distinctive and has bright scarlet upperparts, darker red wings and undertail coverts, and white underparts with a scarlet median stripe running down the throat and belly. Females are patterned like the males, but are olive-brown instead of scarlet.

The scarlet-and-white tanager is found in secondary growth and disturbed vegetation, mostly between elevations of 25–1,200 m (100–3,900 ft), but sometimes up to elevations of 1,700 m (5,600 ft). It feeds mainly on fruit and arthropods. Foraging occurs singly, in pairs, or in groups of up to six, and it can be found in mixed-species flocks with other tanagers, especially those in the genus Tangara.

The scarlet-and-white tanager is listed as least concern by the International Union for Conservation of Nature (IUCN) on the IUCN Red List, due to its large range and relative commonness. It is threatened by increasing deforestation throughout its range, especially in foothills, but is unlikely to be in immediate danger due to its affinity for disturbed habitats.

== Taxonomy and systematics ==
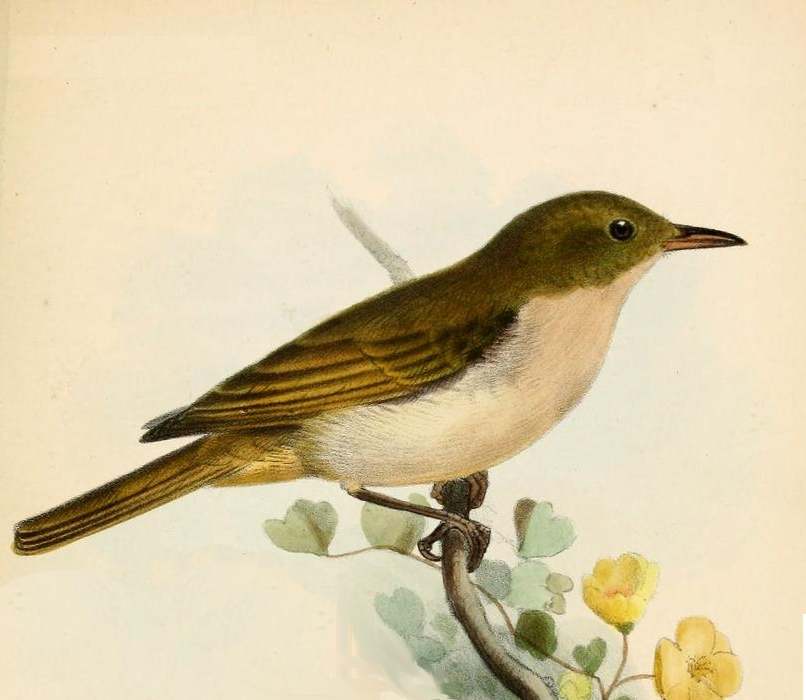
A plate from Catalogue of the birds in the British Museum 11, depicting the type female scarlet-and-white tanager

The scarlet-and-white tanager is one of two species in the genus Chrysothlypis, along with the black-and-yellow tanager. It was first described as Dacnis salmoni by P. L. Sclater in 1886 on the basis of a female specimen collected by him in Remedios, Antioquia, Colombia. It was later put in Nemosia and then Erythrothlypis. It is now generally put in Chrysothlypis, despite its very distinctive male plumage. This placement is supported by molecular analysis. It is monotypic.

The generic name Chrysothlypis comes from the Greek χρυσος (khrusos), meaning gold, and θλυπις (thlupis), which means an unknown bird, but is usually used to refer to a New World warbler or a thin-billed tanager in ornithology. The specific epithet salmoni is named after Thomas Knight Salmon, a British naturalist and collector who worked in Colombia. Scarlet-and-white tanager is the official common name designated by the International Ornithologists' Union. Alternative names for the species include scarlet and white tanager and scarlet-white tanager.

== Description ==
The scarlet-and-white tanager is a relatively thin tanager around 12 cm (4.7 in) long and weighing 9.8–14.5 g (0.35–0.51 oz). The adult male is highly distinctive and has a bright scarlet head, throat, and upperparts. Its wings are mostly a darker red, with brownish-black flight feathers, along with black wingtips. It has a scarlet median stripe running down its breast and belly, with the remaining underparts being white. The undertail coverts are also scarlet. Females have olive-brown upperparts and white underparts, with dusky wings and a dark brown tail. The throat and chest are tinged yellowish-buff, with there sometimes being a yellowish-buff median stripe, similar to the male. Immature males are indistinguishable from the female, while subadult males have patches of red, being otherwise similar in appearance to the female.

The iris is brown. The upper mandible of the bill is dusky, while the lower mandible is pale yellow. The legs are grayish-horn.

=== Vocalizations ===
Its song is an inconspicuous, high-pitched ti ti ti-te-te-ta-heét. The flight call is a weak chip or sciip.

== Distribution ==
The scarlet-and-white tanager is found on the Pacific slope of the western and central Andes in Colombia and Ecuador, mostly at elevations of 25–1,200 m (82–3,937 ft). However, it can be found at elevations of up to 1,700 m (5,600 ft) in the Chocó of the Cordillera Central in Colombia. It inhabits stunted secondary growth on foothills, especially around dense, mossy woodland around ridge tops, steep canyon slopes, or landslide scars. It is also found in openings and disturbed habitat in tall, wet forests with dense mossy growth. It tends to be uncommon and present locally at low elevations, but is more widespread at elevations above 300 m (1,000 ft).

== Behavior and ecology ==
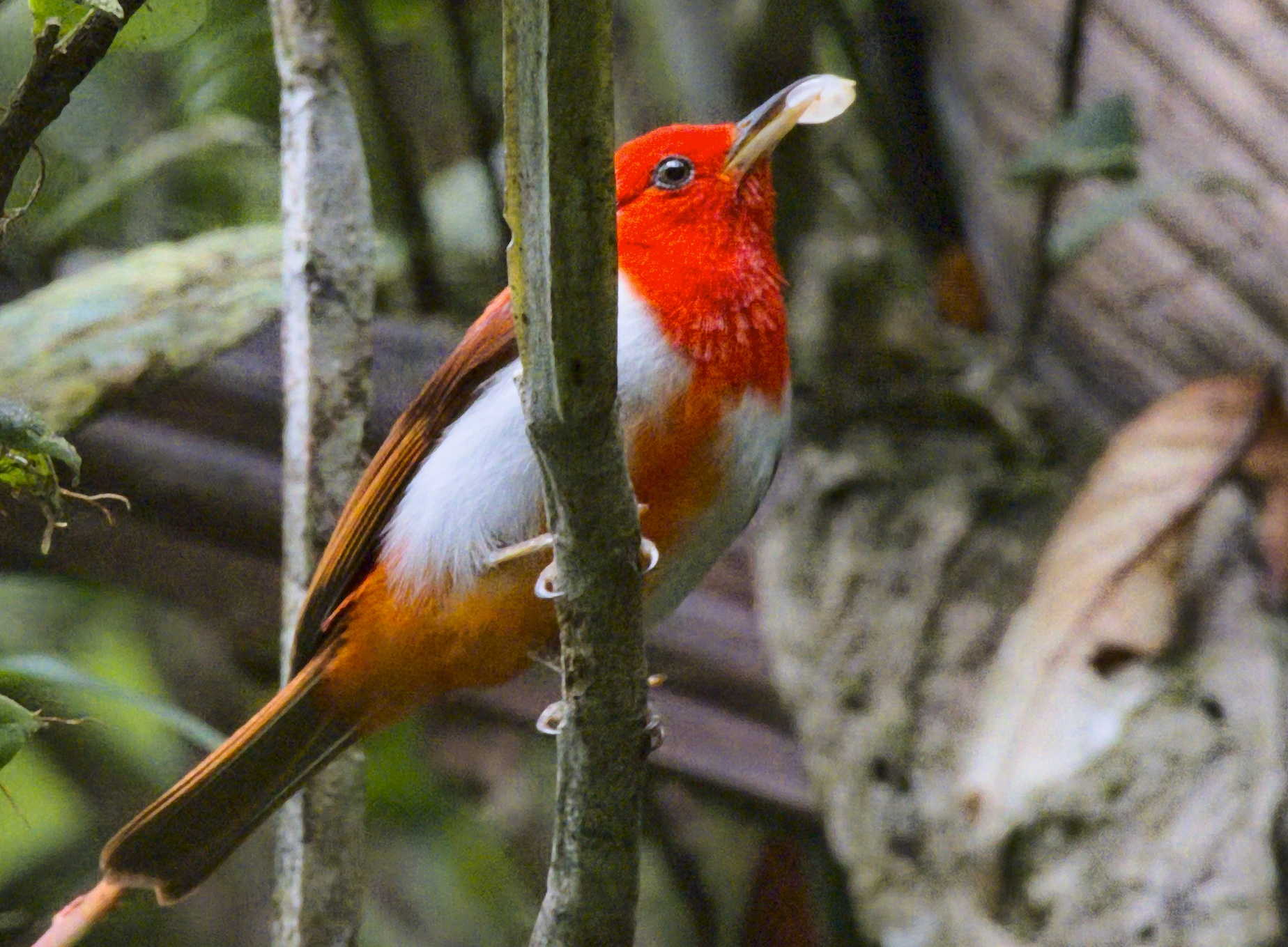
A male with a flower in its beak in Colombia

The species is non-migratory, and no local movements have been recorded.

=== Diet ===
The scarlet-and-white tanager feeds on fruit and arthropods. A study from the western Valle de Cauca showed that 58% of the diet is composed of fruit, with the remainder being small arthropods. Most fruit eaten is from arillate species, such as Tovomitopsis and Clusia, along with Miconia berries. It forages singly, in pairs, or small groups of up to six individuals, either alone or in mixed-species flocks with other tanagers, especially those in the genus Tangara. It feeds on fruit by gleaning, hanging from leaves, or hovering. Smaller fruit are swallowed whole, while larger ones are eaten in pieces. Arthropods are usually foraged at elevations of 4.5–15 m (15–49 ft), and seldom below 3 m (10 ft). Most insects are caught by gleaning, hovering, aerial sallies, or sallies to leaves and flowers.

=== Breeding ===
Little is known about its breeding habits. Fledglings have been seen in April and May. Previous young may also help at the nest.

== Status ==
The scarlet-and-white tanager is listed as least concern by the International Union for Conservation of Nature (IUCN) on the IUCN Red List. It has a large range and is common to uncommon locally throughout its range. It occurs in several protected areas, and much of its range outside protected areas is still relatively intact. Although deforestation is increasing throughout its range, especially in foothills, it is not thought to be under immediate threat due to its affinity for disturbed habitat.
