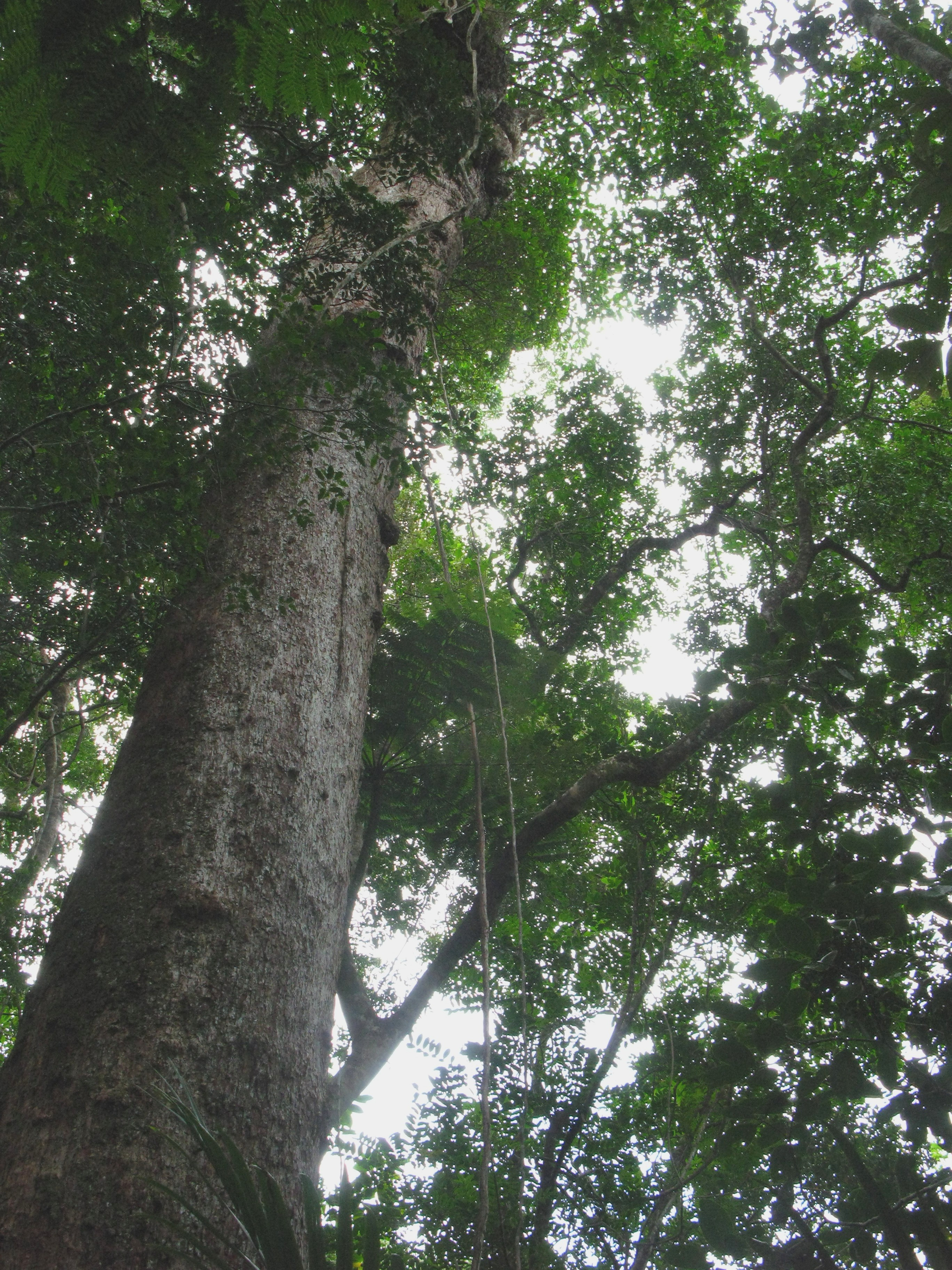

Conservation status
- Vulnerable (IUCN 2.3)

Scientific classification
- Kingdom: Plantae
- Clade: Tracheophytes
- Clade: Angiosperms
- Clade: Eudicots
- Clade: Rosids
- Order: Malpighiales
- Family: Clusiaceae
- Genus: Montrouziera
- Species: M. cauliflora

Binomial name
- Montrouziera cauliflora Planch. & Triana

= Montrouziera cauliflora =

Species of tree

Montrouziera cauliflora, the giant Houp tree, is a species of flowering plant in the family Clusiaceae. It is found only in New Caledonia, and is one of the largest trees in the seasonal tropical forests there. It is found in moist evergreen dense forest of low and medium elevation (between 200 and 1100 m) on all types of soil. The tree has a straight trunk, slightly conical, without buttresses but with a slightly wider base, up to 30 m high and 3 m in diameter (bigger trees are often hollow), with branches protruding horizontally. Houp trees make fruit but it is not edible by humans. Damage causes the bark to exude a yellow resin, thick and sticky, with no peculiar smell. The bark is dark gray or reddish for individuals in very dense forest, with deep vertical cracks. Houp trees are sacred to New Caledonia's indigenous Kanak people, who traditionally used its wood extensively as a building material. It is threatened by habitat loss.
