= Tovomitopsis =

Scientific classification
- Kingdom: Plantae
- Clade: Tracheophytes
- Clade: Angiosperms
- Clade: Eudicots
- Clade: Rosids
- Order: Malpighiales
- Family: Clusiaceae
- Tribe: Clusieae
- Genus: Tovomitopsis; Planch. & Triana

Synonyms
- Bertolonia Spreng.

Genus of flowering plants

Tovomitopsis is a genus of flowering plant in the family Clusiaceae. It includes two species native to southeastern Brazil.

Some species have been synonymized to the genus Chrysochlamys.

== Species ==
Two species are accepted.

- Tovomitopsis paniculata (Spreng.) Planch. & Triana
- Tovomitopsis saldanhae Engl.

=== Formerly placed here ===
- Chrysochlamys membrillensis (D'Arcy) Hammel (as T. membrillensis D'Arcy)
- Chrysochlamys psychotriifolia (Oerst. ex Planch. & Triana) Hemsl. (as T. psychotriifolia Oerst. ex Planch. & Triana, T. costaricana Oerst. ex Planch. & Triana, and T. faucis D'Arcy)
