= Naranjillo =

Naranjillo ("little orange") is a common name for several South American plants with edible fruit:

- Solanum quitoense, usually spelled Naranjilla
- Zanthoxylum naranjillo
- Platonia esculenta
