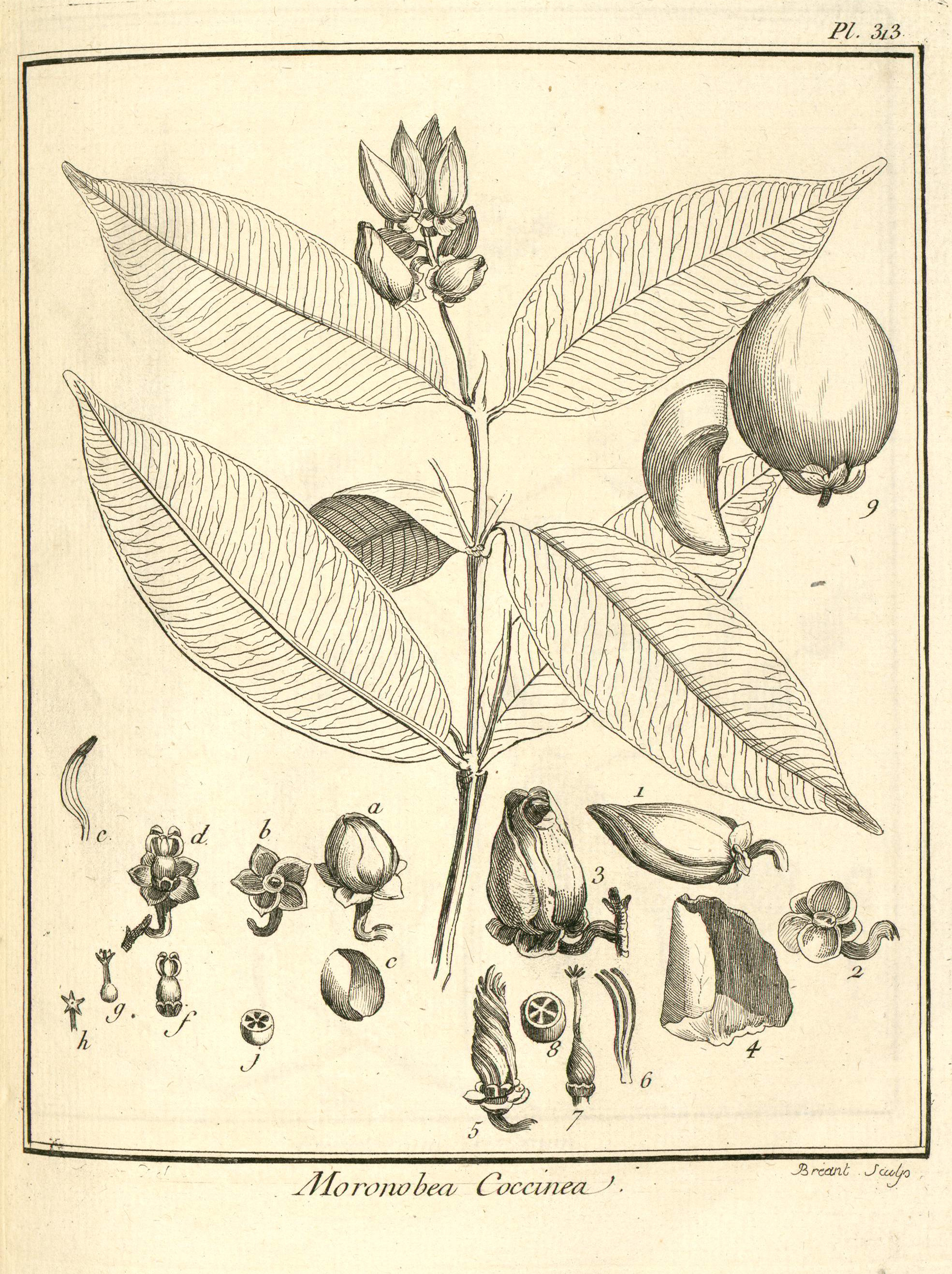
- Moronobea coccinea

Scientific classification
- Kingdom: Plantae
- Clade: Tracheophytes
- Clade: Angiosperms
- Clade: Eudicots
- Clade: Rosids
- Order: Malpighiales
- Family: Clusiaceae
- Tribe: Symphonieae
- Genus: Moronobea; Aubl.

Species
- 7; see text

Synonyms
- Leuconocarpus Spruce ex Planch. & Triana; Pentadesmos Spruce ex Planch. & Triana; Piccia Neck.

= Moronobea =

Genus of trees

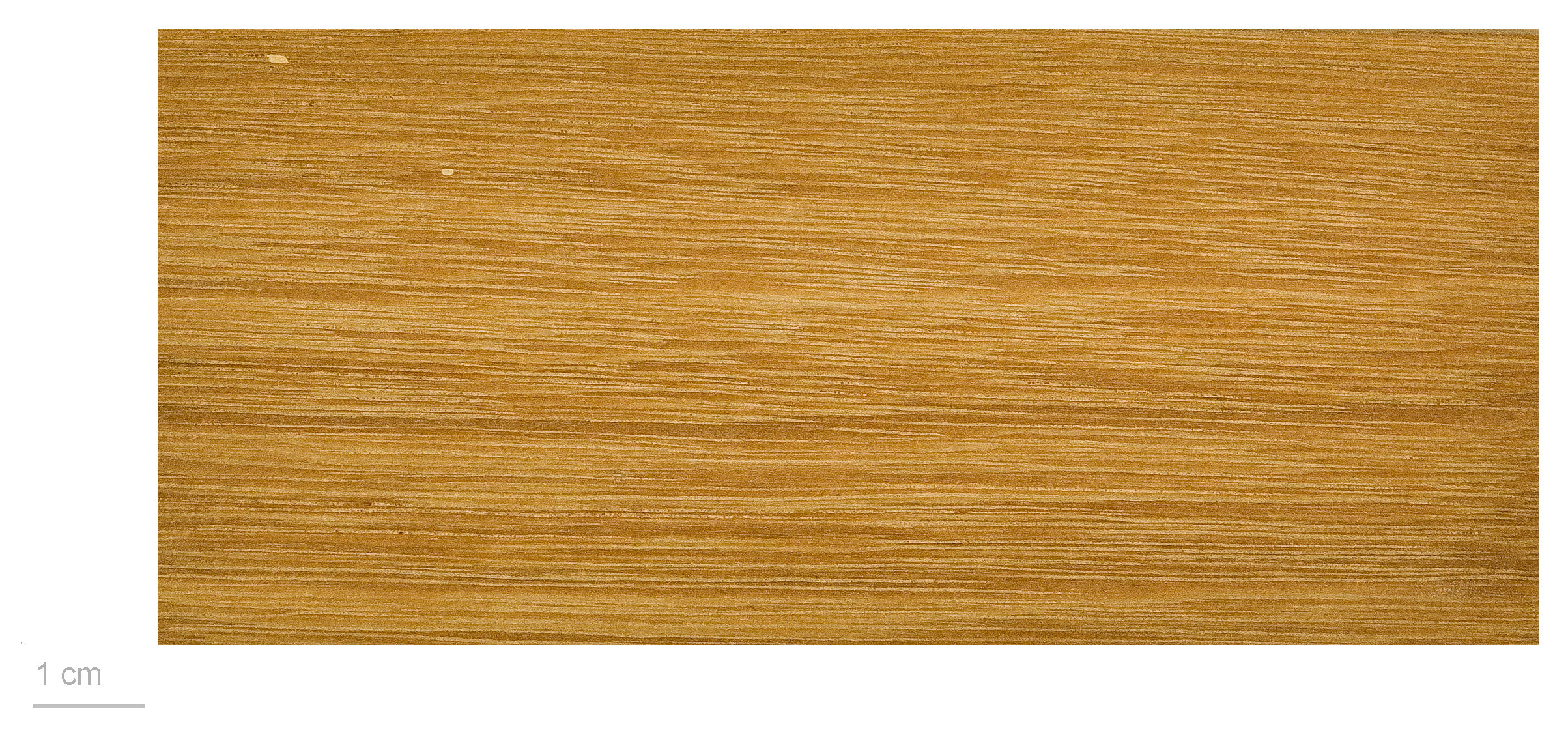
Monorobea coccinea - MHNT

Moronobea is a flowering plant genus of the family Clusiaceae. They are glabrous medium to large trees with yellow latex. The genus comprises seven species native to tropical South America including Bolivia, northern Brazil, Colombia, the Guianas, Peru, and Venezuela. Five species are present in Venezuela. It is related to Platonia and Montrouziera.

The resinous latex of Moronobea coccinea and Moronobea riparia has been widely used by Amerindians for caulking, as a mastic, and burned as a source of light.

== Species ==
Seven species are accepted.

- Moronobea candida Ducke
- Moronobea coccinea Aubl.
- Moronobea intermedia Engl.
- Moronobea jenmanii Engl.
- Moronobea ptaritepuiana Steyerm.
- Moronobea pulchra Ducke
- Moronobea riparia Planch. & Triana
