= Acrocercops guttiferella =

Scientific classification
- Kingdom: Animalia
- Phylum: Arthropoda
- Class: Insecta
- Order: Lepidoptera
- Family: Gracillariidae
- Genus: Acrocercops
- Species: A. guttiferella

Binomial name
- Acrocercops guttiferella (Viette, 1951)

Species of moth

Acrocercops guttiferella is a moth of the family Gracillariidae, known from Madagascar. It was described by Pierre Viette in 1951. The larvae feed on a Guttiferae species.
