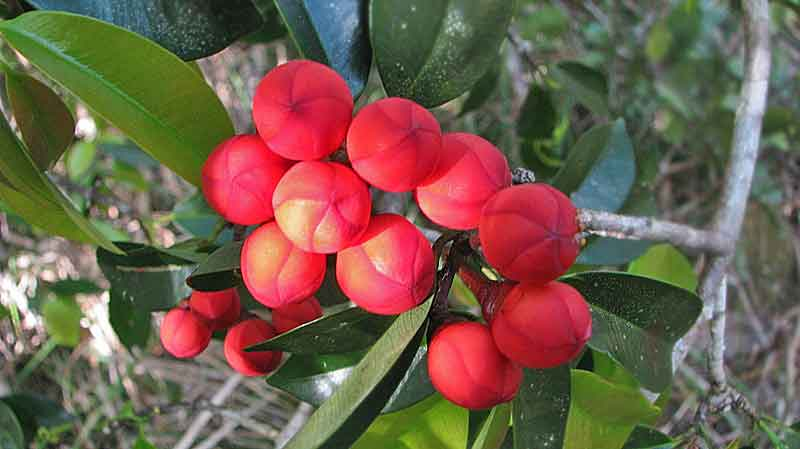

Conservation status
- Least Concern (IUCN 3.1)

Scientific classification
- Kingdom: Plantae
- Clade: Tracheophytes
- Clade: Angiosperms
- Clade: Eudicots
- Clade: Rosids
- Order: Malpighiales
- Family: Clusiaceae
- Genus: Symphonia
- Species: S. globulifera

Binomial name
- Symphonia globulifera L.f.

Synonyms
- Symphonia gabonensis (Vesque) Pierre; Symphonia microphyllaR.E. Schult. Symphonia utilissimaR.E. Schult. Moronobea coccinea Aubl. Moronobea globulifera (L.f) Schltdl. Sources

= Symphonia globulifera =

Species of tree

Symphonia globulifera, commonly known as boarwood, is a timber tree abundant in Central America, the Caribbean, South America and Africa. This plant is also used as a medicinal plant and ornamental plant.

== Common names ==
Common trade names of the wood of the Symphonia globulifera are: chewstick, chestick, manni, manil, azufre, and Árbol de Leche Maria.

== Distribution ==
Symphonia globulifera is abundant in the Americas (from Mexico and the Caribbean south to Ecuador) and Africa (from Liberia east to Uganda and south to Angola).

== Population genetics ==
S. globulifera is highly structured across Mesoamerica and the Caribbean, while the eastern foothills of the Andes show little diversity.

== See also ==
- List of plants of Amazon Rainforest vegetation of Brazil
