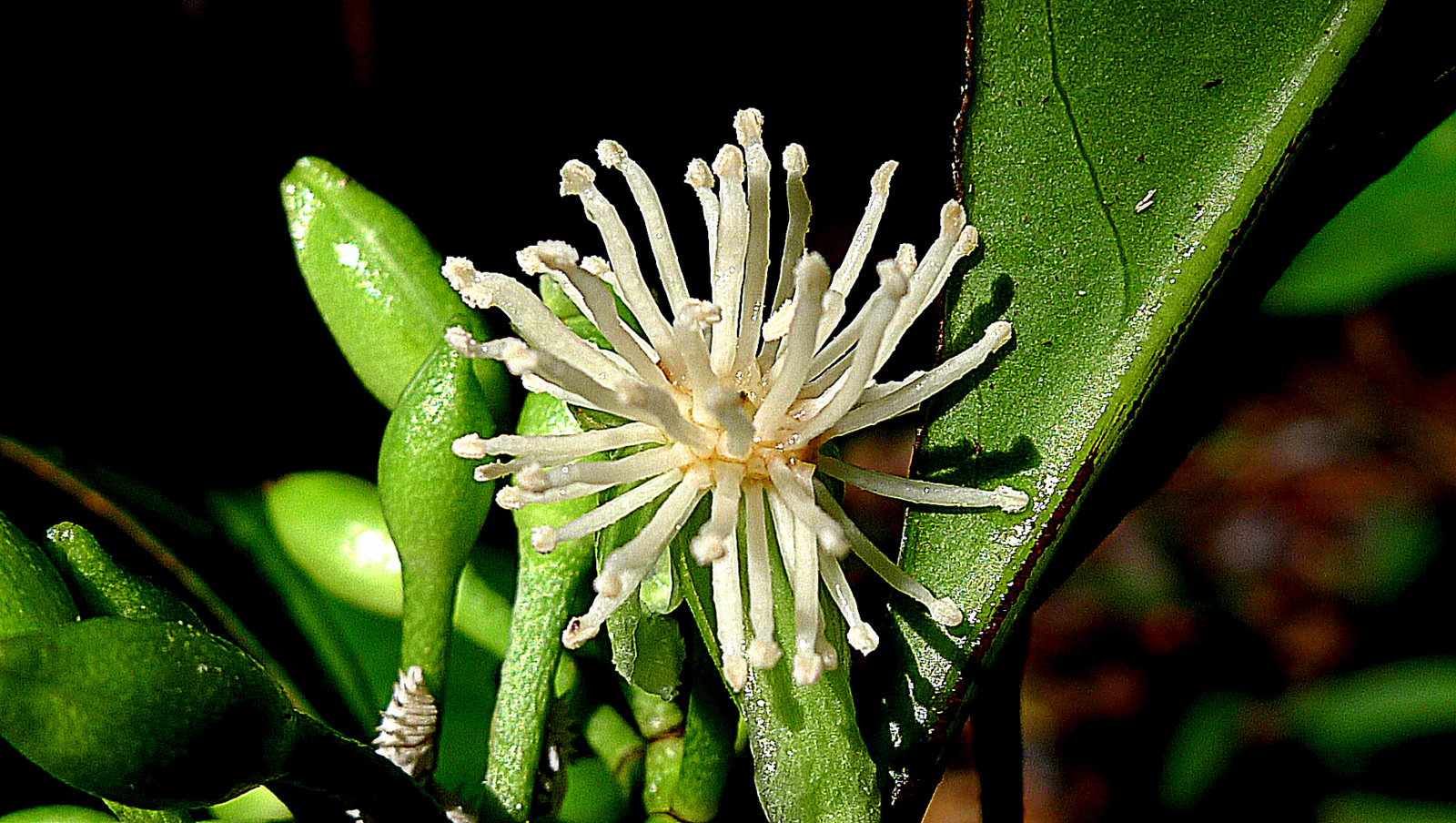
- Flower of Tovomita mangle

Scientific classification
- Kingdom: Plantae
- Clade: Tracheophytes
- Clade: Angiosperms
- Clade: Eudicots
- Clade: Rosids
- Order: Malpighiales
- Family: Clusiaceae
- Tribe: Clusieae
- Genus: Tovomita; Aubl.

Species
- 61, see text

Synonyms
- Beauharnoisia Ruiz & Pav.; Euthales F.Dietr.; Marialva Vand.; Micranthera Choisy; Tovomitidium Ducke

= Tovomita =

Genus of flowering plants

Tovomita is a genus of flowering plants in the family Clusiaceae. They are noted for having white-yellow latex and containing xanthones. The genus is distributed in the tropical Americas from Costa Rica and the Windward Islands to Bolivia and southeastern Brazil, with many occurring in Venezuela. Most are native to the forests of the Amazon.

Most Tovomita species are trees, and a few are shrubs. They sometimes have buttress roots. There are monoecious and dioecious species.

== Taxonomy ==
The taxonomy of this genus and its relatives is a current topic of research. Phylogenetic analyses have helped to clarify relationships between the species, and many new species have been named and described in recent years. The genus Tovomita is not monophyletic.

== Species ==
61 species are accepted.

- Tovomita acutiflora M.Barros & G.Mariz
- Tovomita albiflora A.C.Sm.
- Tovomita amazonica (Poepp.) Walp.
- Tovomita atropurpurea Steyerm.
- Tovomita auriculata Cuello
- Tovomita calodictyos Sandwith
- Tovomita caloneura A.C.Sm.
- Tovomita calophyllophylla García-Villacorta & Hammel
- Tovomita carinata Eyma
- Tovomita caudata L.Marinho
- Tovomita chachapoyasensis Engl.
- Tovomita clarkii Pipoly ex L.Marinho & Gahagen
- Tovomita clusiiflora (Ducke) L.Marinho
- Tovomita colombiana L.Marinho
- Tovomita cornuta Demarchi & L.Marinho
- Tovomita divaricata Maguire
- Tovomita duckei Huber
- Tovomita eggersii Vesque
- Tovomita fanshawei Maguire
- Tovomita foldatsii Cuello
- Tovomita fructipendula (Ruiz & Pav.) Cambess.
- Tovomita gazelii Poncy & Offroy
- Tovomita glazioviana Engl.
- Tovomita gracilipes Planch. & Triana
- Tovomita grandis L.Marinho
- Tovomita grata Sandwith
- Tovomita guianensis Aubl.
- Tovomita hopkinsii Bittrich & L.Marinho
- Tovomita iaspidis L.Marinho & Amorim
- Tovomita laurina Planch. & Triana
- Tovomita leucantha (Schltdl.) Planch. & Triana
- Tovomita longifolia (Rich.) Hochr.
- Tovomita longirostrata L.Marinho
- Tovomita macrophylla (Poepp.) Walp.
- Tovomita manauara A.M.Nobre & L.Marinho
- Tovomita mangle G.Mariz
- Tovomita maxima Molino & J.Engel
- Tovomita megantha L.Marinho & Amorim
- Tovomita morii Maguire
- Tovomita nebulosa L.Marinho & Luján
- Tovomita nervosa L.Marinho
- Tovomita nidiae L.Marinho
- Tovomita obovata Engl.
- Tovomita parviflora Cuatrec.
- Tovomita plumieri Griseb.
- Tovomita riedeliana Engl.
- Tovomita salimenae L.Marinho & Amorim
- Tovomita saulensis J.Engel & Molino
- Tovomita schomburgkii Planch. & Triana
- Tovomita secunda Poepp. ex Planch. & Triana
- Tovomita speciosa Ducke
- Tovomita spruceana Planch. & Triana
- Tovomita stergiosii Cuello
- Tovomita stylosa Hemsl.
- Tovomita tenuiflora Benth. ex Planch. & Triana
- Tovomita trojitana Cuatrec.
- Tovomita turbinata Planch. & Triana
- Tovomita umbellata Benth.
- Tovomita vismiifolia L.Marinho
- Tovomita volkeri L.Marinho
- Tovomita weberbaueri Engl.

=== Formerly placed here ===
- Arawakia weddelliana (Planch. & Triana) L.Marinho (as Tovomita weddelliana Planch. & Triana)
- Chrysochlamys microcarpa (Poepp.) L.Marinho & A.Caro (as Tovomita microcarpa (Poepp.) Walp.)
- Clusia aequatoriensis (Benoist) L.Marinho & A.Caro (as Tovomita aequatoriensis Benoist)

== Threats ==
Some species are considered to be threatened, but the conservation status for most Tovomita species is not known due to lack of data. The most significant threat to the species is the deforestation of the Amazon.
