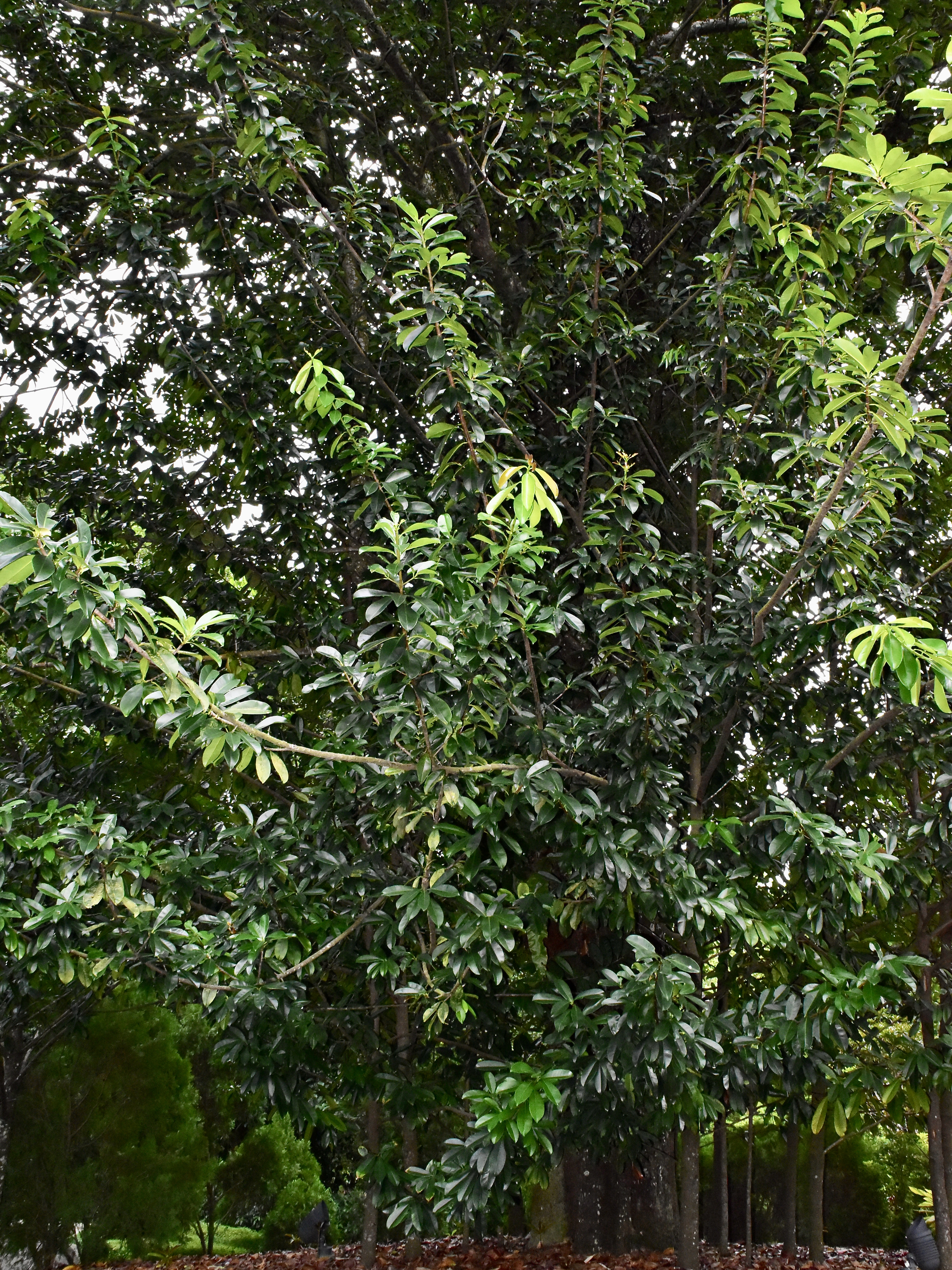

Conservation status
- Least Concern (IUCN 3.1)

Scientific classification
- Kingdom: Plantae
- Clade: Tracheophytes
- Clade: Angiosperms
- Clade: Eudicots
- Clade: Rosids
- Order: Malpighiales
- Family: Clusiaceae
- Genus: Pentadesma
- Species: P. butyracea

Binomial name
- Pentadesma butyracea Sabine 1824

Synonyms
- Pentadesma kerstingii Engl. ex Volkens; Pentadesma lecomteana Pierre ex A.Chev.; Pentadesma leptonema Pierre; Pentadesma leptonema var. klainei Pierre ex A.Chev.; Pentadesma leucantha A.Chev.; Pentadesma nigritana Baker f.; Pentadesma ogoouensis Baudon; Pentadesma parviflora Exell

= Pentadesma butyracea =

Species of tree

Pentadesma butyracea is a tree native to the forests of tropical Africa from Sierra Leone to Cameroon. It has multiple uses, the main one being the manufacture of a kind of butter called "kpangnan butter" similar to shea butter. The timber is used in cabinetmaking and construction.

It is sometimes called African butter tree.

== Description ==
Pentadesma butyracea has a straight, cylindrical bole without buttress and an average height of 20 m.. It bears large bright red flowers, giving edible berries whose seed is used to make butter.

The flowers of the butter tree are pollinated by the Woermann's bat.

== Uses ==
The seeds are used to make kpangnan butter also called painya, kanya in Benin, kanga in Sierra Leone, akpoto in Togo among others. This butter can be stored for one to three years without going rancid.

Kpangnan is traded locally, particularly in central Togo and Benin. It is occasionally sold in the US and Europe as "yellow shea butter", In reality, shea butter and kpangnan are extracted from two different tree species and have noticeably different scents, appearances and textures. A feature unique to kpangnan butter is its high stigmasterol content (around 45% of the sterol content). Stigmasterol is the sterol unsaturated vegetable fat usually found in plant parts such as calabar bean, soybean oil, rapeseed oil, and cocoa butter. Stigmasterol is used as a base material in the production of synthetic progesterone, but has other interesting properties. Research shows that stigmasterol can reduce the risk of certain cancers, including ovarian cancer.

Like shea butter, kpangnan has been harvested in West Africa for generations. It is used in cosmetics (for hair, to moisturize the skin), as edible oil, and for the manufacture of traditional soaps.
