= Tovomita chachapoyasensis =

Conservation status
- Vulnerable (IUCN 2.3)

Scientific classification
- Kingdom: Plantae
- Clade: Tracheophytes
- Clade: Angiosperms
- Clade: Eudicots
- Clade: Rosids
- Order: Malpighiales
- Family: Clusiaceae
- Genus: Tovomita
- Species: T. chachapoyasensis

Binomial name
- Tovomita chachapoyasensis Engl.

Species of plant

Tovomita chachapoyasensis is a species of flowering plant in the family Clusiaceae. It is found only in Peru.
