= Chrysochlamys membrillensis =

Conservation status
- Data Deficient (IUCN 3.1)

Scientific classification
- Kingdom: Plantae
- Clade: Tracheophytes
- Clade: Angiosperms
- Clade: Eudicots
- Clade: Rosids
- Order: Malpighiales
- Family: Clusiaceae
- Genus: Chrysochlamys
- Species: C. membrillensis

Binomial name
- Chrysochlamys membrillensis (D'Arcy) Hammel

Synonyms
- Tovomitopsis membrillensis D'Arcy

Species of flowering plant

Chrysochlamys membrillensis is a species of flowering plant in the family Clusiaceae. It is a tree endemic to Panama.

The species was first described as Tovomitopsis membrillensis by William Gerald D'Arcy in 1981. In 1999 Barry Edward Hammel placed the species in genus Chrysochlamys as C. membrillensis.
