= Chrysochlamys psychotriifolia =

Conservation status
- Least Concern (IUCN 3.1)

Scientific classification
- Kingdom: Plantae
- Clade: Tracheophytes
- Clade: Angiosperms
- Clade: Eudicots
- Clade: Rosids
- Order: Malpighiales
- Family: Clusiaceae
- Genus: Chrysochlamys
- Species: C. psychotriifolia

Binomial name
- Chrysochlamys psychotriifolia (Oerst. ex Planch. & Triana) Hemsl.

Synonyms
- Chrysochlamys costaricana (Oerst. ex Planch. & Triana) Hemsl.; Tovomitopsis costaricana Oerst. ex Planch. & Triana; Tovomitopsis faucis D'Arcy; Tovomitopsis psychotriifolia Oerst. ex Planch. & Triana

Species of flowering plant

Chrysochlamys psychotriifolia is a species of flowering plant in the family Clusiaceae. It is a shrub or tree native to Costa Rica and Panama.

The species was first described by Jules Émile Planchon and José Jerónimo Triana in 1860. In 1879 William Hemsley placed the species in genus Chrysochlamys as C. psychotriifolia.
