= Chrysochlamys microcarpa =

Conservation status
- Vulnerable (IUCN 2.3)

Scientific classification
- Kingdom: Plantae
- Clade: Tracheophytes
- Clade: Angiosperms
- Clade: Eudicots
- Clade: Rosids
- Order: Malpighiales
- Family: Clusiaceae
- Genus: Chrysochlamys
- Species: C. microcarpa

Binomial name
- Chrysochlamys microcarpa (Poepp.) L.Marinho & A.Caro

Synonyms
- Marialva microcarpa Poepp.; Tovomita microcarpa (Poepp.) Walp.

Species of plant

Chrysochlamys microcarpa is a species of flowering plant in the family Clusiaceae. It is a tree found only in Peru.

The species was first describes as Marialva microcarpa by Eduard Friedrich Poeppig in 1840. In 1842 Wilhelm Gerhard Walpers renamed the species Tovomita microcarpa. In 2024 Lucas Cardoso Marinho and Angy V. Caro-Sánchez placed the species in genus Chrysochlamys as C. microcarpa.
