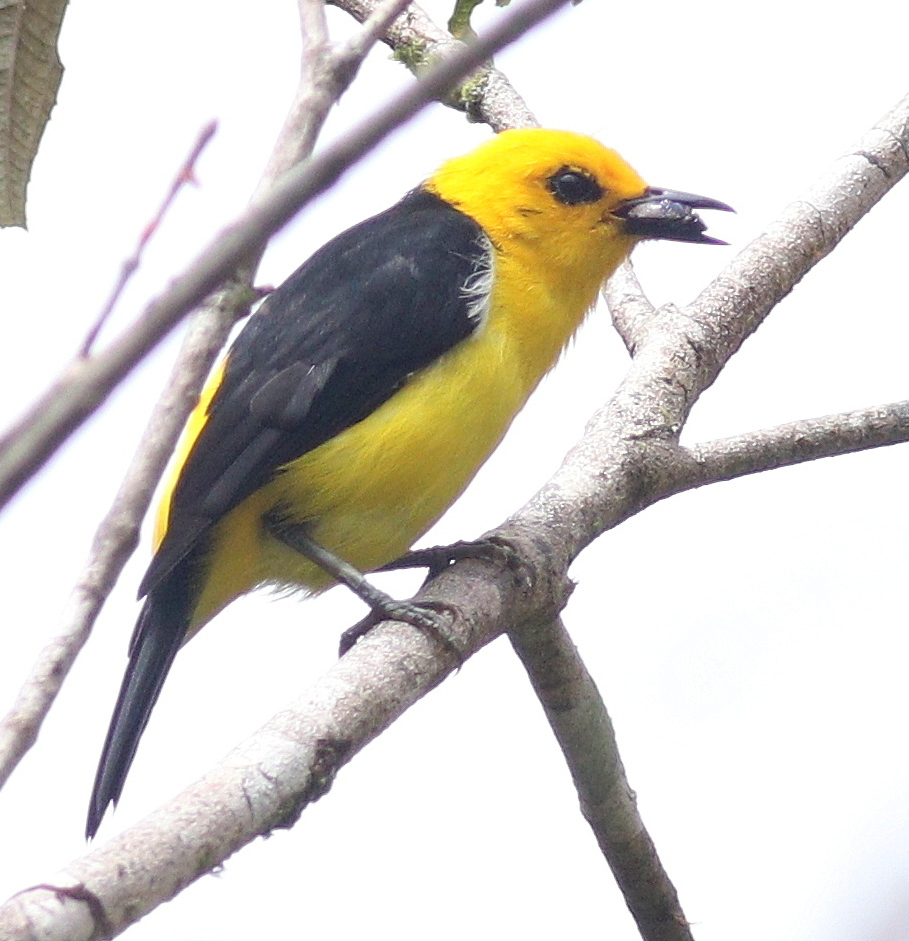

Conservation status
- Least Concern (IUCN 3.1)

Scientific classification
- Kingdom: Animalia
- Phylum: Chordata
- Class: Aves
- Order: Passeriformes
- Family: Thraupidae
- Genus: Chrysothlypis
- Species: C. chrysomelas

Binomial name
- Chrysothlypis chrysomelas (Sclater, PL & Salvin, 1869)

Synonyms
- Tachyphonus chrysomelas (protonym)

= Black-and-yellow tanager =

Species of bird

The black-and-yellow tanager (Chrysothlypis chrysomelas) is a species of bird in the family Thraupidae, the tanagers and allies. It is found in Colombia, Costa Rica, and Panama.

== Taxonomy and systematics ==
The black-and-yellow tanager was formally described in 1869 with the binomial Tachyphonus chrysomelas. By 1912 it had been reassigned to its present genus Chrysothlypis, which it shares with the scarlet-and-white tanager (C. salmoni). Some taxonomic systems incorrectly modified the specific epithet to chrysomelaena, but later restored the original to conform to the International Code of Zoological Nomenclature.

The black-and-yellow tanager has three subspecies, the nominate C. c. chrysomelas (Sclater, PL & Salvin, 1869), C. c. titanota (Storrs, 1981), and C. c. ocularis (Nelson, 1912).

== Description ==
The black-and-yellow tanager is 12 cm (4.7 in) to 13 cm (5.1 in) long. It weighs 11 to 15 g (0.39 to 0.53 oz). It has a thin, sharply pointed bill and resembles a New World warbler. The species is sexually dimorphic. Adult males of the nominate subspecies are mostly bright yellow with a thin black ring around the eye and jet-black hindneck, mantle, upper back, wings, and tail. Adult females have a greenish olive head, upperparts, and tail. Their wings' flight feathers are dusky with greenish olive edges. Their throat and breast are yellow, their flanks and sides yellow with an olive-green tinge, their undertail coverts yellowish, and their underwing coverts white.

Males of subspecies C. c. ocularis have partially black lores. Females are brighter overall than the nominate with more uniform greenish yellow underparts. Males of C. c. titanota are identical to the nominate. Females have mostly white underparts with a faint yellowish band across the breast and grayish flanks. In all subspecies immature males resemble adult females but with brighter underparts. Both sexes of all subspecies have a brown iris, a black bill, and blackish legs and feet.

== Distribution ==
The black-and-yellow tanager has a patchy distribution. Subspecies C. c. titanota is the northernmost. It is found on the Caribbean slopes of Costa Rica's Cordillera Central and Cordillera de Talamanca from Alajuela Province to, and possibly slightly into, far western Panama. The nominate subspecies is found intermittently in Panama from western Chiriquí Province east to western Panamá Province. Subspecies C. c. ocularis is found on the Caribbean slope from Cerro Jefe in western Panamá Province and on the Pacific slope from far eastern Panamá Province south slightly into extreme northwestern Colombia on Cerro Tacarcuna.

The black-and-yellow tanager primarily inhabits the canopy and edges of primary and mature secondary evergreen forest in the upper tropical and lower subtropical zones. It also occurs much less often in forest clearings that have tall trees. Sources differ on its elevational range. Two state it is 350 to 1,600 m (1,100 to 5,200 ft) while another says 500 to 1,250 m (1,600 to 4,100 ft). In Costa Rica it ranges between 400 to 1,200 m (1,300 to 3,900 ft).

== Behavior ==
=== Movement ===
The black-and-yellow tanager is a year-round resident.

=== Feeding ===
The black-and-yellow tanager feeds on arthropods and fruit; Miconia berries apparently are an important part of its diet. It typically forages in pairs and groups of up to six individuals and frequently joins mixed-species feeding flocks. It takes arthropod prey by gleaning from leaves and branches (sometimes hanging upside down to do so), by probing clusters of dead leaves, in mid-air with a short flutter-flight, and by briefly hovering.

=== Breeding ===
The only known nest of a black-and-yellow tanager was a cup made from thin rootlets lined with fungal rhizomorphs; it had a layer of dead leaves between them and green moss on the outside. It was near the end of a tree branch about 8 m (25 ft) above the ground. Nothing else is known about the species' breeding biology.

=== Vocalization ===
The black-and-yellow tanager's song has seldom been recorded. Its call, which is often given in flight, is "a sharp, sibilant tsee or tseeeut like that of a hummingbird (Trochilidae), singly, doubled or followed by several shorter notes, e.g. tsew tsu-tsu-tsu".

== Status ==
The IUCN has assessed the black-and-yellow tanager as being of Least Concern. It has a large range; its estimated population of at least 50,000 mature individuals is believed to be decreasing. No immediate threats have been identified. It is considered uncommon to locally fairly common overall and fairly common in Costa Rica. Though it occurs in several protected areas, "its range is increasingly fragmented, especially in Costa Rica and W Panama, where large areas of lowland and foothill forest have been converted to agricultural purposes, e.g. bananas and cattle, and are being lost to expanding human settlement".
