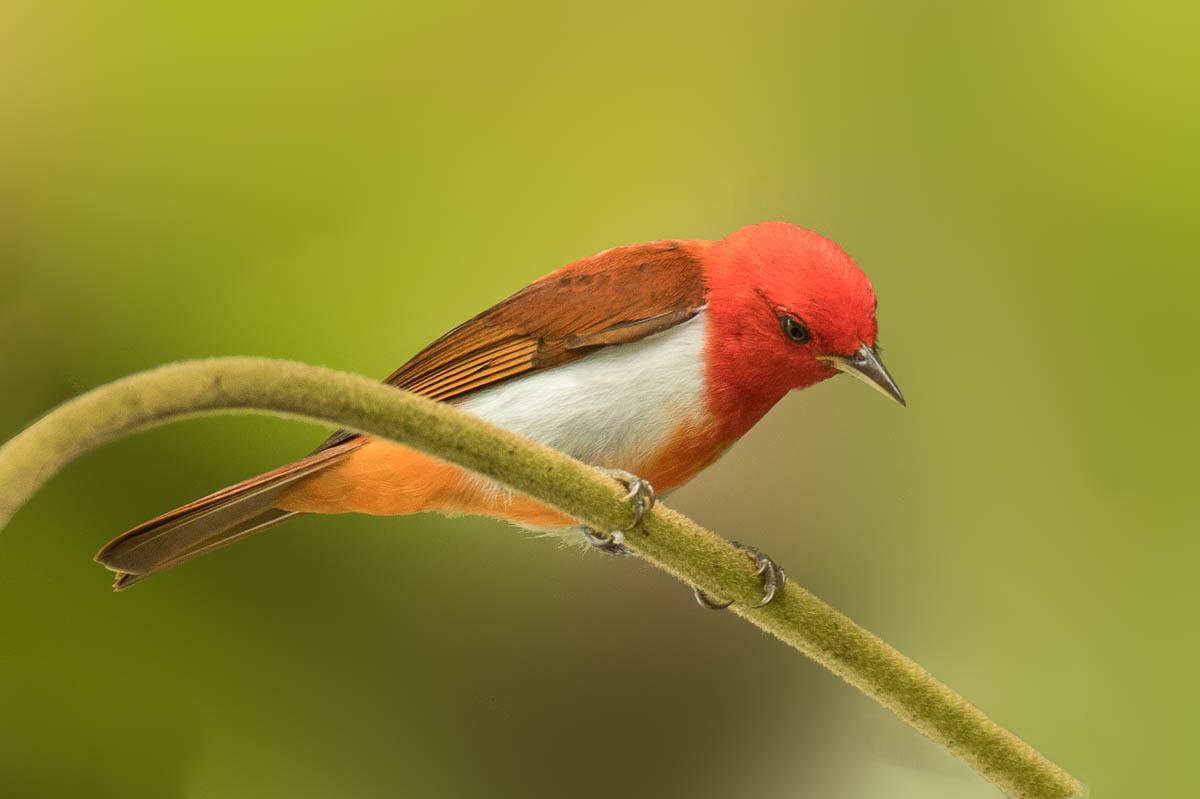
- Scarlet-and-white tanager (Chrysothlypis salmoni)

Scientific classification
- Kingdom: Animalia
- Phylum: Chordata
- Class: Aves
- Order: Passeriformes
- Family: Thraupidae
- Genus: Chrysothlypis; Berlepsch, 1912

Type species
- Tachyphonus chrysomelas Sclater & Salvin, 1869

Species
- Chrysothlypis chrysomelas Chrysothlypis salmoni

= Chrysothlypis =

Genus of birds

Chrysothlypis is a small genus of tanagers found in humid forests of southern Central America and the Chocó in South America. The males of these small birds are strikingly yellow and black or red and white, while the females are much duller.

== Taxonomy and species list ==
The genus Chrysothlypis was introduced in 1912 by the German ornithologist Hans von Berlepsch with the black-and-yellow tanager as the type species. The name combines the Ancient Greek khrusos meaning "gold" with thlupis, an unknown bird.

The genus contains the following two species:

Genus Chrysothlypis – Berlepsch, 1912 – two species
| Common name | Scientific name and subspecies | Range | Size and ecology | IUCN status and estimated population |
|---|---|---|---|---|
| Black-and-yellow tanager | Chrysothlypis chrysomelas (Sclater, PL & Salvin, 1869) | Costa Rica and Panama | Size: Habitat: Diet: | LC |
| Scarlet-and-white tanager | Chrysothlypis salmoni (Sclater, PL, 1886) | Colombia and northern Ecuador. | Size: Habitat: Diet: | LC |
