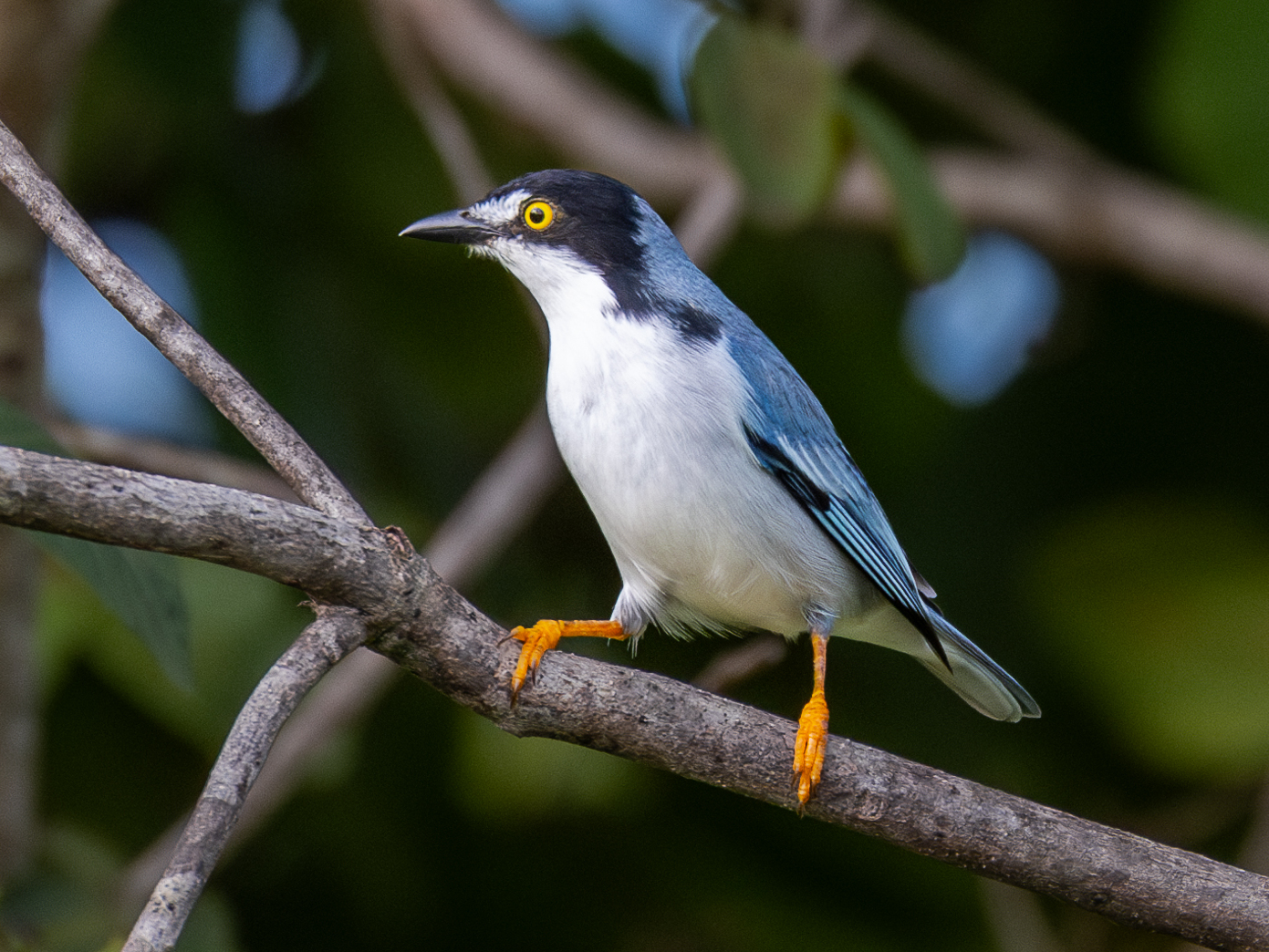

Conservation status
- Least Concern (IUCN 3.1)

Scientific classification
- Kingdom: Animalia
- Phylum: Chordata
- Class: Aves
- Order: Passeriformes
- Family: Thraupidae
- Genus: Nemosia
- Species: N. pileata

Binomial name
- Nemosia pileata (Boddaert, 1783)

Synonyms
- Tanagra pileata (protonym)

= Hooded tanager =

Species of bird

The hooded tanager (Nemosia pileata) is a species of bird in the family Thraupidae, the tanagers and allies. It is found in every mainland South American country except Chile, Ecuador, and Uruguay.

== Taxonomy and systematics ==
The hooded tanager was described by the French polymath Georges-Louis Leclerc, Comte de Buffon in 1779 in his Histoire Naturelle des Oiseaux from a specimen collected in Cayenne, French Guiana. The bird was also illustrated in a hand-colored plate engraved by François-Nicolas Martinet in the Planches Enluminées D'Histoire Naturelle which was produced under the supervision of Edme-Louis Daubenton to accompany Buffon's text. Neither the plate caption nor Buffon's description included a scientific name but in 1783 the Dutch naturalist Pieter Boddaert coined the binomial Tanagra pileata in his catalogue of the Planches Enluminées.

The hooded tanager is now placed in the genus Nemosia that was introduced by the French ornithologist Louis Pierre Vieillot in 1816 with the hooded tanager as the type species. The genus name is from the Ancient Greek nemos meaning "glade" or "dell". The specific epithet pileata is from the Latin pileatus meaning "-capped". The hooded tanager shares the genus with the cherry-throated tanager (N. rourei).

The hooded tanager has these six subspecies:

- N. p. hypoleuca Todd, 1916
- N. p. surinamensis Zimmer, JT, 1947
- N. p. pileata (Boddaert, 1783)
- N. p. interna Zimmer, JT, 1947
- N. p. nana Berlepsch, 1912
- N. p. caerulea (Wied-Neuwied, M, 1831)

== Description ==
The hooded tanager is 12 to 13.5 cm (4.7 to 5.3 in) long and weighs 12 to 21 g (0.42 to 0.74 oz). The species is sexually dimorphic. Adult males of the nominate subspecies N. p. pileata have white lores and a white throat and sides of the neck on an otherwise black head. Their lower nape and their upperparts, wings, and tail are grayish blue. Their underparts are white with pale gray flanks. Adult females have the same white lores as males but the rest of their head is the same grayish blue as their upperparts. Their white underparts have a buff tinge that is heaviest on the sides of the throat and breast. Both sexes have a yellow iris and yellow or yellow-brown legs and feet. Males have a black bill; females have a black maxilla and a grayish white or light gray mandible. Juveniles have pale blue upperparts, bluish gray underparts, and rose-orange legs and feet.

The other subspecies of the hooded tanager differ from the nominate and each other thus:

- N. p. hypoleuca: male - little or no gray on the flanks; female - paler buffy tinge on underparts than nominate
- N. p. surinamensis: larger than nominate with darker upperparts
- N. p. interna: smaller than nominate with paler upperparts
- N. p. nana: darker more purplish blue upperparts and darker bluish gray sides than nominate
- N. p. caerulea: larger than nominate

== Distribution and habitat ==
The hooded tanager has a disjunct distribution with a large gap in the northern Amazon Basin between N. p. hypoleuca and N. p. surinamensis in the north and N. p. interna, N. p. nana, and N. p. caerulea in the south. In addition, N. p. hypoleuca has gaps in its range, and N. p. pileata has populations on both sides of the Amazon Basin gap. The subspecies are found thus:

- N. p. hypoleuca: northern Colombia from Córdoba Department east to Magdalena Department and south in the valley of the Magdalena River to southern Cesar Department; western Venezuela's Maracaibo Basin in Zulia, western Lara, and southeastern Falcón; intermittently in Venezuela east of the Andes from western Apure north to the Capital District and east to western Delta Amacuro and northeastern Bolívar state
- N. p. surinamensis: Guyana and Suriname
- N. p. pileata: French Guiana; Brazil south of the Amazon between the Madeira and Tapajós rivers and south into extreme northern Bolivia
- N. p. interna: north-central Brazil in the Negro and Branco river basins
- N. p. nana: from northeastern Peru's Marañón River basin east across extreme southeastern Colombia into western Brazil to the lower Madeira
- N. p. caerulea: from southeastern Peru's Madre de Dios Department east across Brazil south of the Amazon and east of the Tapajós to the Atlantic, southeast through much of Bolivia and Paraguay into northern Argentina and east from there across Brazil north of an approximate line from central Rio Grande do Sul to the Atlantic in Paraná (Note: This article's map does not agree with that of a field guide to birds of southern South America; the description here is from the field guide.)

The hooded tanager inhabits a variety of wooded landscapes including gallery, secondary, and mangrove forests and along rivers in extensive forest. In the Amazon Basin it is found mostly in gallery forest, along forest edges, in lighter woodlands, and in plantations. In elevation it occurs below 500 m (1,600 ft) in Colombia and below 600 m (2,000 ft) in Venezuela and Brazil.

== Behavior ==
=== Movement ===
The hooded tanager is a year-round resident.

=== Feeding ===
The hooded tanager feeds primarily on insects, occasionally eats fruit, and might also eat nectar. It forages in pairs or family groups and occasionally joins mixed-species feeding flocks. It forages mostly high in trees but sometimes in lower shrubs. It takes most prey by gleaning from leaves and bark and takes some from spider webs with a brief hover.

=== Breeding ===
The hooded tanager's breeding season has not been defined but includes March to July in Colombia and August to December in Suriname. Both sexes build the nest, an open cup made from plant fibers and attached to a high branch with spider web. The clutch is two eggs that are bluish with brown or gray spots. The female alone incubates. The incubation period, time to fledging, and details of parental care are not known.

=== Vocalization ===
The hooded tanager's dawn song in Brazil is a "short, very high, thin, rapidly descending ti-ti-ti-si-sui-sui-seeh" and call an "extremely high, thin tsi". In Venezuela its dawn song is "a high, insistent tsip-tsip ti-CHEW ti-CHEW or variant". It also makes "high-pitched, lisped tic and sip notes" and "when excited tic, tic-tttttttttttttttt and other chips and trills".

== Status ==
The IUCN has assessed the hooded tanager as being of Least Concern. It has an extremely large range; its population size is not known but is believed to be stable. No immediate threats have been identified. It is considered common in northeastern Colombia and locally common in the far southeast. In Venezuela it "seems nowhere very numerous". It is "frequent to uncommon" in Brazil, "fairly common" in northern Peru, and "much rarer and more local" in southeastern Peru.
