= Marsh St. Johnswort =

Marsh St. Johnswort is a common name for several plants and may refer to:

- Hypericum elodes, a species native to western Europe
- Triadenum, a genus native to North America
