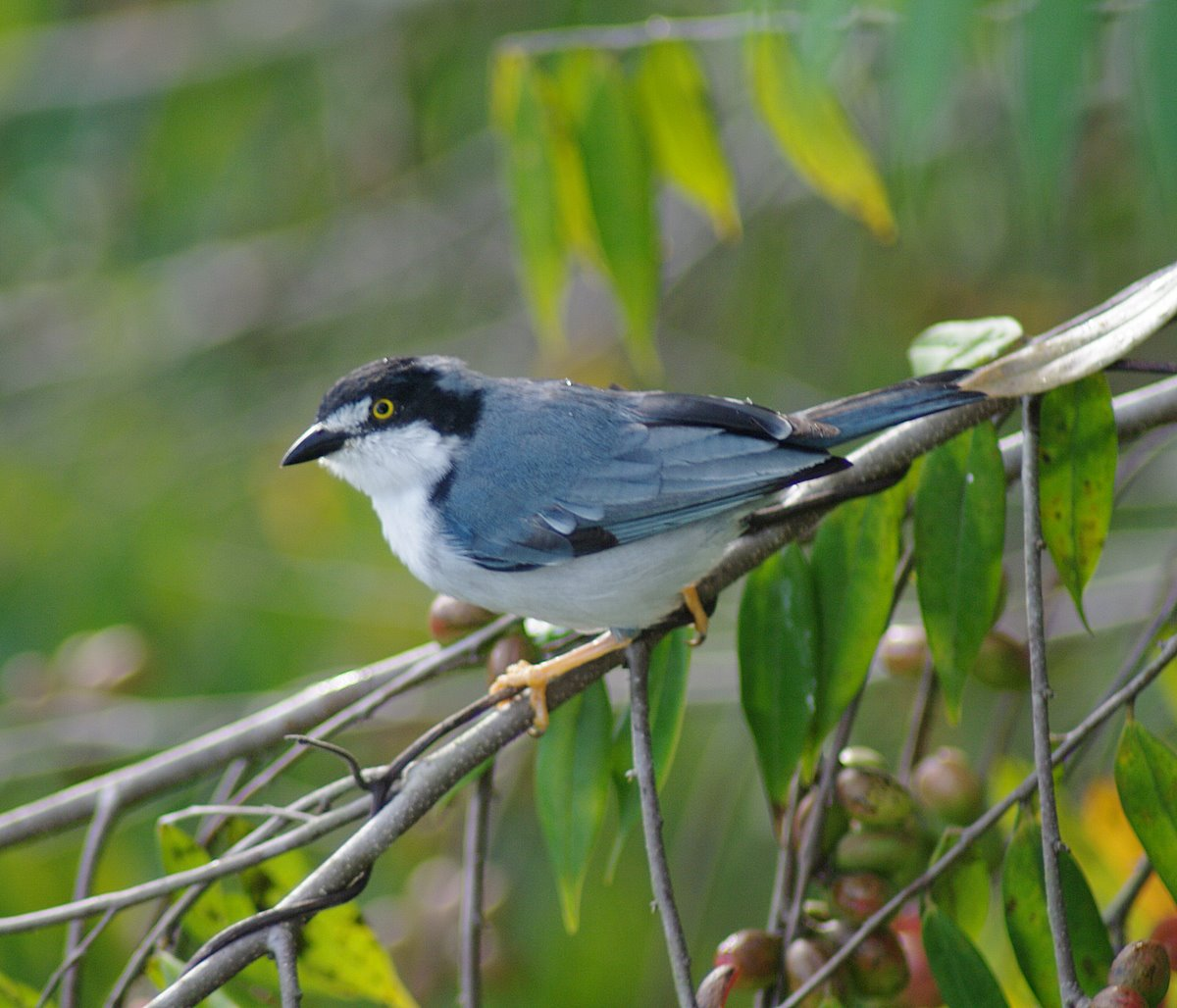
- Hooded tanager, Nemosia pileata

Scientific classification
- Kingdom: Animalia
- Phylum: Chordata
- Class: Aves
- Order: Passeriformes
- Family: Thraupidae
- Genus: Nemosia; Vieillot, 1816

Type species
- Tanagra pileata Boddaert, 1783

Species
- Nemosia pileata; Nemosia rourei

= Nemosia =

Genus of birds

Nemosia is a genus of South American birds in the tanager family Thraupidae.

The genus was introduced by the French ornithologist Louis Pierre Vieillot in 1816 with the hooded tanager as the type species. The name Nemosia is from the Ancient Greek nemos meaning "glade" or "dell".

== Species ==
The genus contains the following two species:

Genus Nemosia – Vieillot, 1816 – two species
Common name	Scientific name and subspecies	Range	Size and ecology	IUCN status and estimated population
Hooded tanager	Nemosia pileata (Boddaert, 1783) Six subspecies: N. p. hypoleuca Todd, 1916; N. p. surinamensis Zimmer, JT, 1947; N. p. pileata (Boddaert, 1783); N. p. interna Zimmer, JT, 1947; N. p. nana von Berlepsch, 1912; N. p. caerulea (zu Wied-Neuwied, 1831)	Argentina, Bolivia, Brazil, Colombia, French Guiana, Guyana, Paraguay, Peru, and Venezuela.	Size: Habitat: Diet:	LC
Cherry-throated tanager	Nemosia rourei Cabanis, 1870	Atlantic Forest in Espírito Santo, Brazil	Size: Habitat: Diet:	CR
