= Lorostemon =

Scientific classification
- Kingdom: Plantae
- Clade: Embryophytes
- Clade: Tracheophytes
- Clade: Spermatophytes
- Clade: Angiosperms
- Clade: Eudicots
- Clade: Rosids
- Order: Malpighiales
- Family: Clusiaceae
- Tribe: Symphonieae
- Genus: Lorostemon; Ducke

Genus of plants

Lorostemon is a genus of flowering plants in the family Clusiaceae. Its native range is southern Tropical America.

Species:

- Lorostemon bombaciflorus Ducke
- Lorostemon coelhoi Paula
- Lorostemon colombianus Maguire
- Lorostemon negrensis Fróes
- Lorostemon stipitatus Maguire
