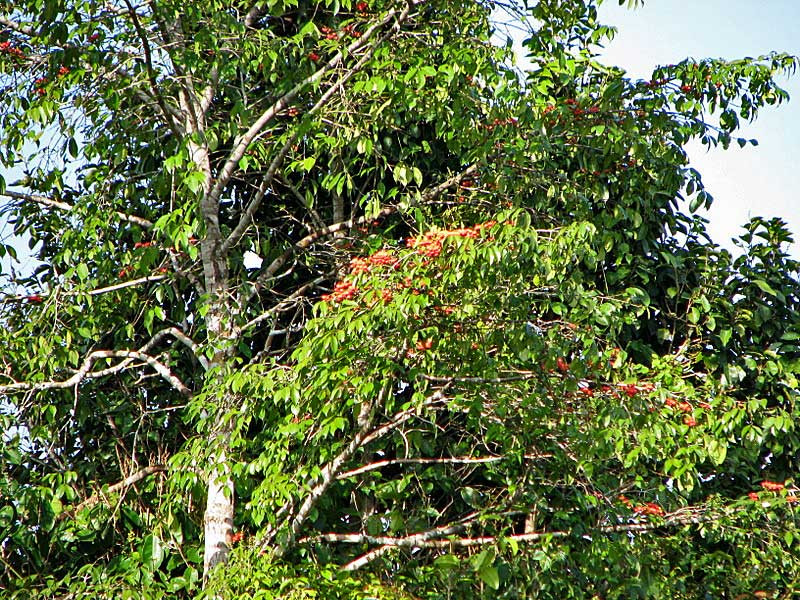
- Symphonia globulifera

Scientific classification
- Kingdom: Plantae
- Clade: Tracheophytes
- Clade: Angiosperms
- Clade: Eudicots
- Clade: Rosids
- Order: Malpighiales
- Family: Clusiaceae
- Tribe: Symphonieae
- Genus: Symphonia; L.f.

Type species
- Symphonia globulifera L.f.

Species
- 16; see text

Synonyms
- Actinostigma Welw.; Aneuriscus C.Presl; Chrysopia Noronha ex Thouars

= Symphonia (plant) =

Genus of trees

Symphonia is a genus of tropical woody plants, specifically trees in the family Clusiaceae. The genus has its diversity center in Madagascar and one species (Symphonia globulifera) disjunct in the Afrotropic and the Neotropic in the Amazon rainforest.

Because of this particular distribution pattern, the origin of the genus is controversial: two hypotheses have been proposed, one suggesting an Amazon origin, the other a Madagascar origin.

== Species ==
As of April 2026, Plants of the World Online accepts 16 species:

- Symphonia clusioides Baker
- Symphonia eugenioides Baker
- Symphonia fasciculata (Thouars) Baill.
- Symphonia globulifera L.f.
- Symphonia gymnoclada (Planch. & Triana) Benth. & Hook.f. ex Vesque
- Symphonia lepidocarpa Baker
- Symphonia linearis H.Perrier
- Symphonia louvelii Jum.
- Symphonia microphylla (Hils. & Bojer ex Cambess.) Benth. & Hook.f. ex Vesque
- Symphonia nectarifera Jum. & H.Perrier
- Symphonia oligantha Baker.f.
- Symphonia pauciflora Baker
- Symphonia sessiliflora H.Perrier
- Symphonia tanalensis Jum.
- Symphonia urophylla (Decne. ex Planch. & Triana) Vesque
- Symphonia verrucosa (Hils. & Bojer ex Planch. & Triana) Vesque
