= Dystovomita =

Scientific classification
- Kingdom: Plantae
- Clade: Tracheophytes
- Clade: Angiosperms
- Clade: Eudicots
- Clade: Rosids
- Order: Malpighiales
- Family: Clusiaceae
- Tribe: Clusieae
- Genus: Dystovomita (Engl.) D'Arcy

Genus of plants

Dystovomita is a genus of flowering plants belonging to the family Clusiaceae.

Its native range is Central and Southern Tropical America.

Species:

- Dystovomita clusiifolia (Maguire) D'Arcy
- Dystovomita paniculata (Donn.Sm.) Hammel
