= Quapoya =

Scientific classification
- Kingdom: Plantae
- Clade: Tracheophytes
- Clade: Angiosperms
- Clade: Eudicots
- Clade: Rosids
- Order: Malpighiales
- Family: Clusiaceae
- Genus: Quapoya; Aubl. (1775)

Species
- Quapoya bracteolata (Planch. & Triana) Sandwith; Quapoya froesii Maguire; Quapoya longipes (Ducke) Maguire; Quapoya sulphurea Poepp.

Synonyms
- Smithia Scop. (1777), nom. superfl.

Genus of plants

Quapoya is a genus of flowering plants in the family Clusiaceae. It includes four species native to northern South America, ranging from Colombia and Peru to northern Brazil and Guyana.

- Quapoya bracteolata (Planch. & Triana) Sandwith
- Quapoya froesii Maguire
- Quapoya longipes (Ducke) Maguire
- Quapoya sulphurea Poepp.
