= Thysanostemon =

Scientific classification
- Kingdom: Plantae
- Clade: Tracheophytes
- Clade: Angiosperms
- Clade: Eudicots
- Clade: Rosids
- Order: Malpighiales
- Family: Clusiaceae
- Tribe: Symphonieae
- Genus: Thysanostemon; Maguire

Genus of flowering plants

Thysanostemon is a genus of flowering plants belonging to the family Clusiaceae.

Its native range is Guyana.

Species:

- Thysanostemon fanshawei Maguire
- Thysanostemon pakaraimae Maguire
