= Lebrunia bushaie =

Conservation status
- Vulnerable (IUCN 3.1)

Scientific classification
- Kingdom: Plantae
- Clade: Tracheophytes
- Clade: Angiosperms
- Clade: Eudicots
- Clade: Rosids
- Order: Malpighiales
- Family: Clusiaceae
- Genus: Lebrunia; Staner (1934)
- Species: L. bushaie

Binomial name
- Lebrunia bushaie Staner

Species of flowering plant

Lebrunia bushaie is a flowering plant species of the family Clusiaceae. It is a tree endemic to the central Democratic Republic of the Congo. It is the sole species in the genus Lebrunia.
