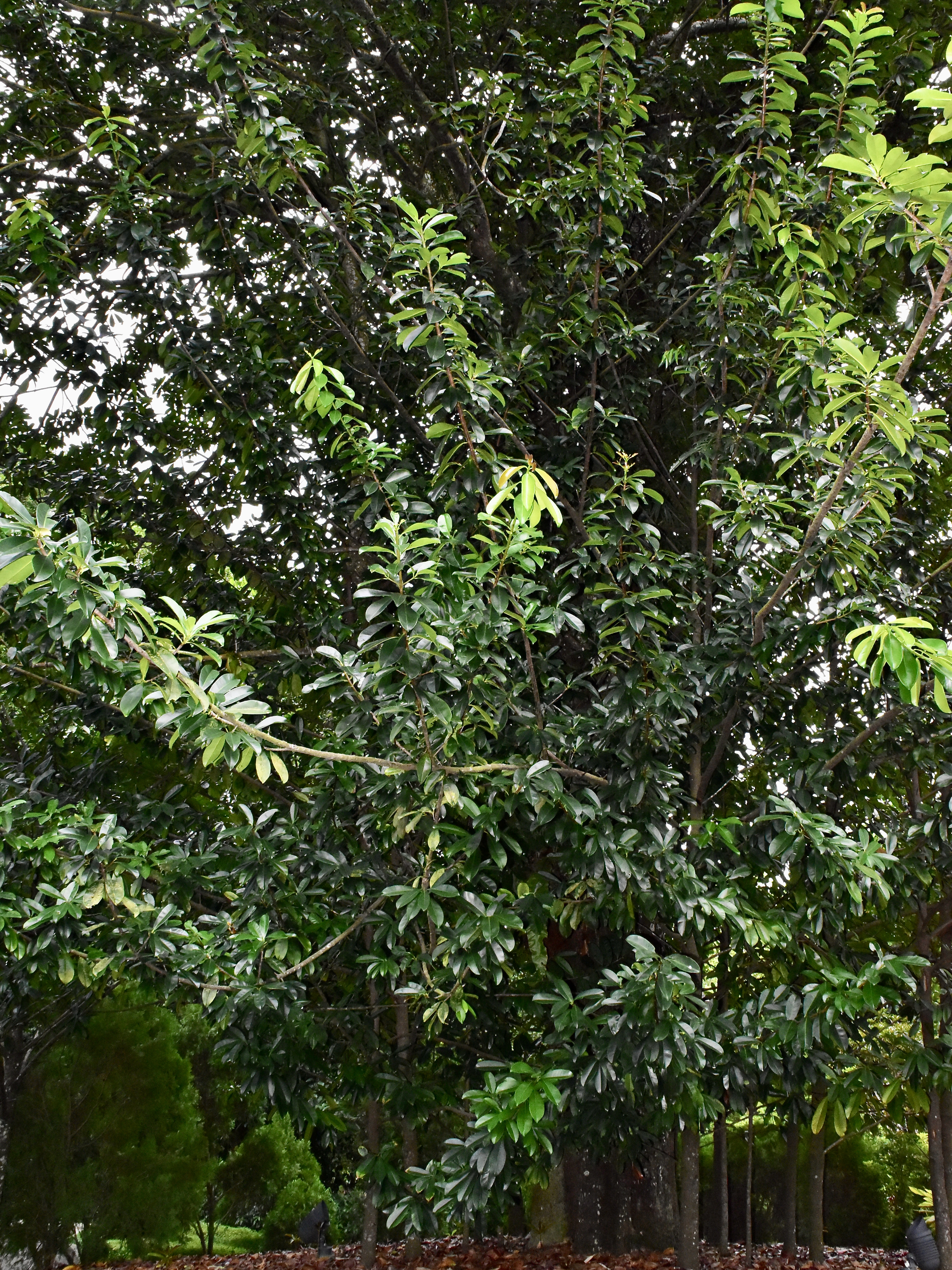
- Pentadesma butyracea

Scientific classification
- Kingdom: Plantae
- Clade: Tracheophytes
- Clade: Angiosperms
- Clade: Eudicots
- Clade: Rosids
- Order: Malpighiales
- Family: Clusiaceae
- Tribe: Symphonieae
- Genus: Pentadesma; Sabine

= Pentadesma =

Genus of plants

Pentadesma is a genus of flowering plants belonging to the family Clusiaceae.

Its native range is western and west-central Tropical Africa.

== Species ==
Species:

- Pentadesma butyracea Sabine
- Pentadesma exelliana Staner
- Pentadesma grandifolia Baker f.
- Pentadesma lebrunii Staner
- Pentadesma reyndersii Spirlet
