= Nouhuysia =

Scientific classification
- Kingdom: Plantae
- Clade: Tracheophytes
- Clade: Angiosperms
- Clade: Eudicots
- Clade: Rosids
- Order: Malpighiales
- Family: Clusiaceae
- Genus: Nouhuysia; Lauterb. (1912)

Species
- Nouhuysia elaeocarpoides (Gilg & Schltr.) Steenis & Hatus.; Nouhuysia novoguineensis (Gibbs) Steenis & Hatus.; Nouhuysia pachyphylla (Gilg & Schltr.) Steenis & Hatus.

Synonyms
- Idenburgia Gibbs (1917)

Genus of plants

Nouhuysia is a genus of flowering plants in the family Clusiaceae. It includes three species endemic to New Guinea.

- Nouhuysia elaeocarpoides (Gilg & Schltr.) Steenis & Hatus.
- Nouhuysia novoguineensis (Gibbs) Steenis & Hatus.
- Nouhuysia pachyphylla (Gilg & Schltr.) Steenis & Hatus.

The genus was described by Carl Adolf Georg Lauterbach in 1912, and named after Jan Willem van Nouhuys (1869–1963), a Dutch naval officer and seafarer and director at two museums in Rotterdam who collected plants in New Guinea.
