= Havetiopsis =

Scientific classification
- Kingdom: Plantae
- Clade: Tracheophytes
- Clade: Angiosperms
- Clade: Eudicots
- Clade: Rosids
- Order: Malpighiales
- Family: Clusiaceae
- Genus: Havetiopsis; Planch. & Triana (1860)
- Species: H. hippocrateoides

Binomial name
- Havetiopsis hippocrateoides Planch. & Triana (1860)

Synonyms
- Havetia hippocrateoides (Planch. & Triana) Vesque (1891)

Genus of plants

Havetiopsis hippocrateoides is a species of flowering plant in the family Clusiaceae. It is a tree native to Peru and Venezuela. It is the sole species in genus Havetiopsis.
