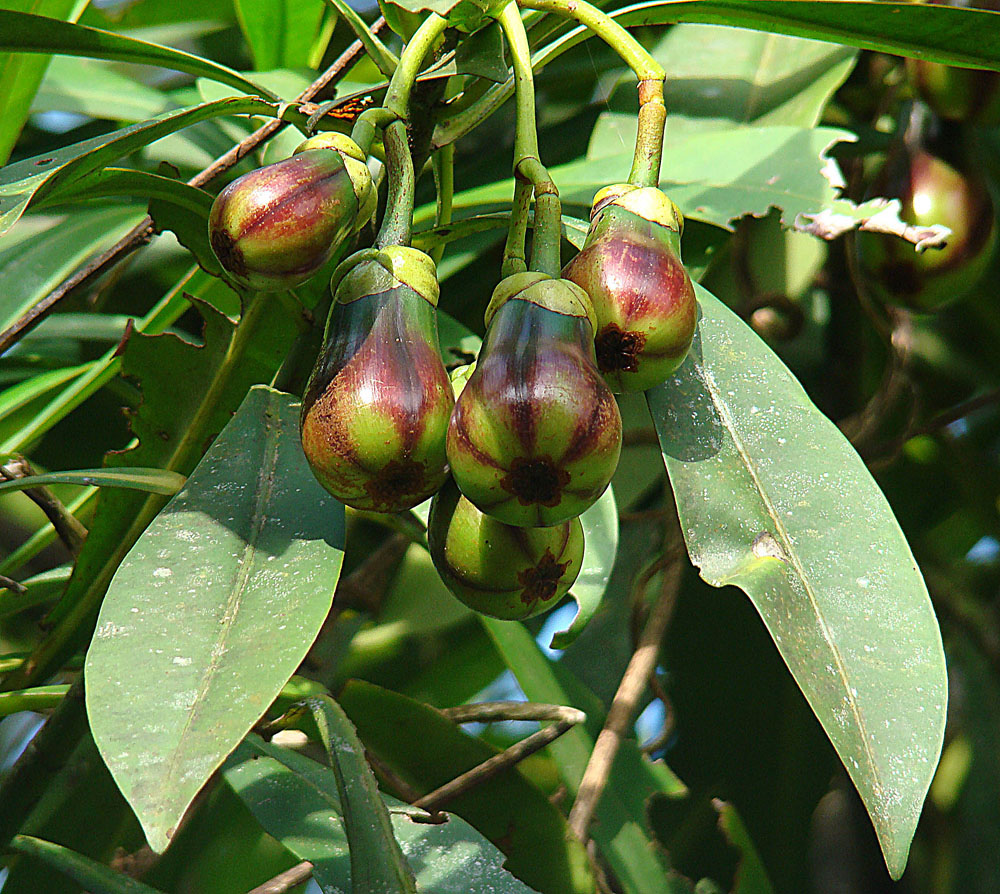

Conservation status
- Least Concern (IUCN 3.1)

Scientific classification
- Kingdom: Plantae
- Clade: Tracheophytes
- Clade: Angiosperms
- Clade: Eudicots
- Clade: Rosids
- Order: Malpighiales
- Family: Clusiaceae
- Genus: Arawakia; L.Marinho
- Species: A. weddelliana

Binomial name
- Arawakia weddelliana (Planch. & Triana) L.Marinho

Synonyms
- Synonymy: Arawakia angustata (Steyerm.) L.Marinho; Arawakia caputmonsia (Gahagen) L.Marinho; Arawakia coriacea (Maguire) L.Marinho; Arawakia divesora (Gahagen) L.Marinho; Arawakia glossophylla (Cuatrec.) L.Marinho; Arawakia lanceolata (Cuatrec.) L.Marinho; Arawakia lingulata (Cuatrec.) L.Marinho; Arawakia longicuneata (Engl.) L.Marinho; Arawakia macrocarpa (Cuatrec.) L.Marinho; Arawakia manchamancha (Gahagen) L.Marinho; Arawakia oblanceolata (Rusby) L.Marinho; Arawakia panamaea (Gahagen) L.Marinho; Arawakia parvifolia (Gahagen) L.Marinho; Arawakia pithecobia (Standl. & L.O.Williams) L.Marinho; Arawakia rhizophoroides (Cuatrec.) L.Marinho; Arawakia rileyi (Cuatrec.) L.Marinho; Arawakia sphenophylla (Diels) L.Marinho; Clusia equinoglossa Cuatrec.; Clusia oblanceolata Rusby; Clusia pithecobia Standl. & L.O.Williams; Tovomita angustata Steyerm.; Tovomita caputmonsia Gahagen; Tovomita coriacea Maguire; Tovomita divesora Gahagen; Tovomita glossophylla Cuatrec.; Tovomita lanceolata Cuatrec.; Tovomita lingulata Cuatrec.; Tovomita longicuneata Engl.; Tovomita macrocarpa Cuatrec.; Tovomita manchamancha Gahagen; Tovomita panamaea Gahagen; Tovomita parvifolia Gahagen; Tovomita pithecobia (Standl. & L.O.Williams) Gahagen; Tovomita rhizophoroides Cuatrec.; Tovomita rileyi Cuatrec.; Tovomita sphenophylla Diels in Notizbl.; Tovomita weddelliana Planch. & Triana (1860) (basionym)

= Arawakia weddelliana =

Species of flowering plant

Arawakia weddelliana is a species of flowering plant in the family Clusiaceae, and the sole species in genus Arawakia. It is a shrub or tree native to the tropical Americas, ranging from Nicaragua to Bolivia and northern Brazil. It grows in lowland and montane tropical rain forest up to 2,683 meters elevation.

The species was first described as Tovomita weddelliana by Jules Émile Planchon and José Jerónimo Triana in 1860. In 2019 Lucas Cardoso Marinho placed the species in the newly described genus Arawakia as A. weddelliana. It has many synonyms.
