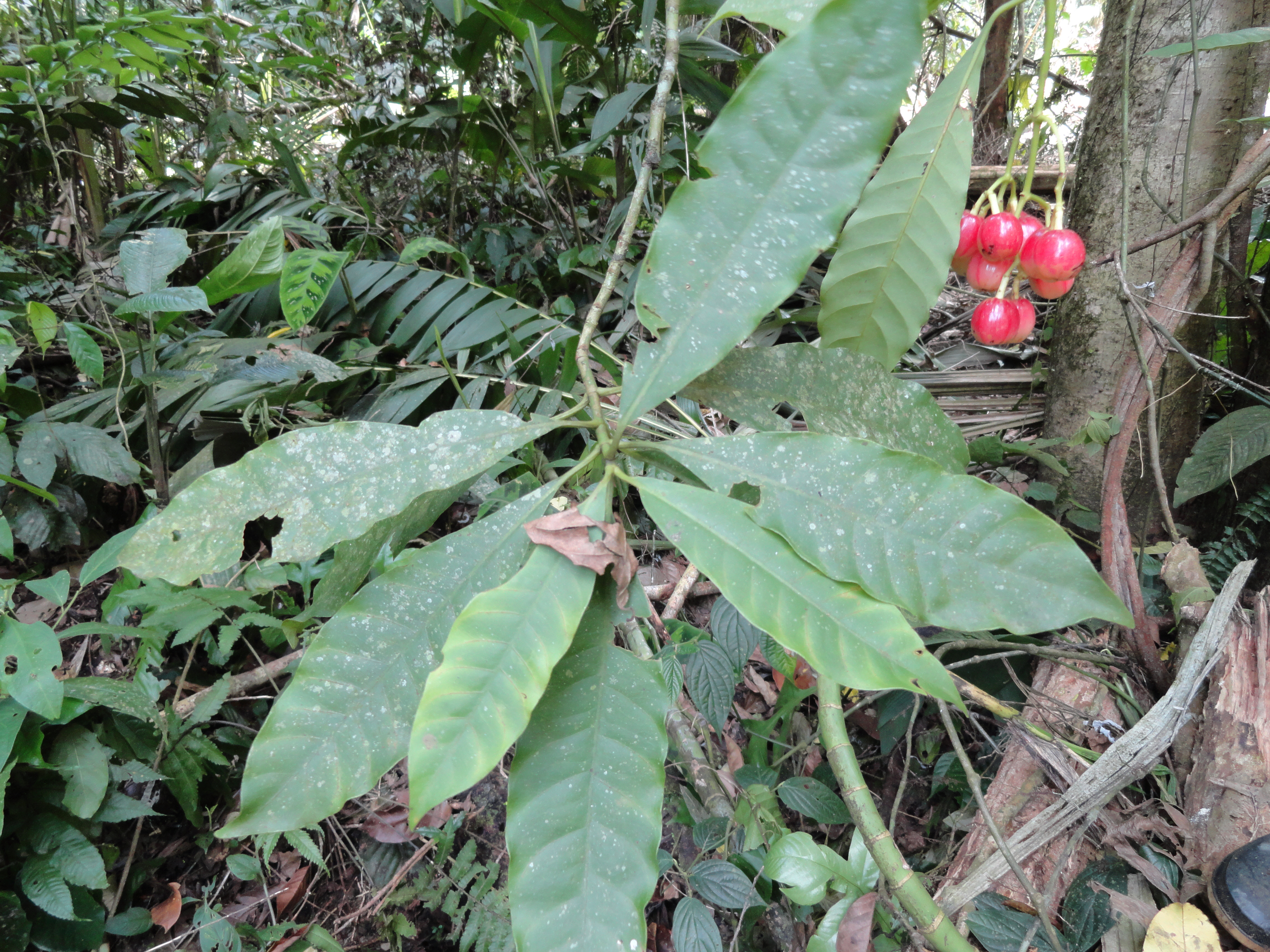

Scientific classification
- Kingdom: Plantae
- Clade: Tracheophytes
- Clade: Angiosperms
- Clade: Eudicots
- Clade: Rosids
- Order: Malpighiales
- Family: Clusiaceae
- Tribe: Clusieae
- Genus: Chrysochlamys; Poepp. (1840)

Species
- See text

Synonyms
- Balboa Planch. & Triana (1860); Commirhoea Miers (1855); Poecilostemon Triana & Planch. (1860)

= Chrysochlamys =

Genus of flowering plants

Chrysochlamys is a genus of flowering plants in the family Clusiaceae. It includes 38 species native to the tropical Americas, ranging from southern Mexico to Bolivia and northern Brazil.

== Synonymy ==
The monotypic genus Balboa Planch. & Triana has been put in synonymy with Chrysochlamys.

== Species ==
38 species are accepted.

- Chrysochlamys allenii (Maguire) Hammel
- Chrysochlamys alterninervia Cuatrec.
- Chrysochlamys angustifolia (Maguire) Hammel
- Chrysochlamys balboa Hammel
- Chrysochlamys bracteolata Cuatrec.
- Chrysochlamys caribaea Urb.
- Chrysochlamys chrisharonii Vásquez & R.Rojas
- Chrysochlamys colombiana (Cuatrec.) Cuatrec.
- Chrysochlamys conferta Cuatrec.
- Chrysochlamys croatii (Maguire) L.Marinho & Hammel
- Chrysochlamys cuneata (Planch. & Triana) Cuatrec.
- Chrysochlamys dependens Planch. & Triana
- Chrysochlamys eclipes L.O.Williams
- Chrysochlamys floribunda Cuatrec.
- Chrysochlamys glauca (Oerst. ex Planch. & Triana) Hemsl.
- Chrysochlamys gloriosa Cuatrec.
- Chrysochlamys goudotii Planch. & Triana
- Chrysochlamys guatemaltecana Donn.Sm.
- Chrysochlamys laxa Planch. & Triana
- Chrysochlamys macrophylla Pax
- Chrysochlamys membranacea Planch. & Triana
- Chrysochlamys membrillensis (D'Arcy) Hammel
- Chrysochlamys micrantha Engl.
- Chrysochlamys microcarpa (Poepp.) L.Marinho & A.Caro
- Chrysochlamys montieliae R.Rojas & Vásquez
- Chrysochlamys multiflora Poepp.
- Chrysochlamys myrcioides Planch. & Triana
- Chrysochlamys nicaraguensis (Oerst., Planch. & Triana) Hemsl.
- Chrysochlamys pachypoda Planch. & Triana
- Chrysochlamys pauciflora Steyerm.
- Chrysochlamys pavonii Planch. & Triana
- Chrysochlamys psychotriifolia (Oerst. ex Planch. & Triana) Hemsl.
- Chrysochlamys silvicola (Hammel) Hammel
- Chrysochlamys skutchii Hammel
- Chrysochlamys tenuifolia Cuatrec.
- Chrysochlamys tenuis Hammel
- Chrysochlamys ulei Engl.
- Chrysochlamys weberbaueri Engl.
