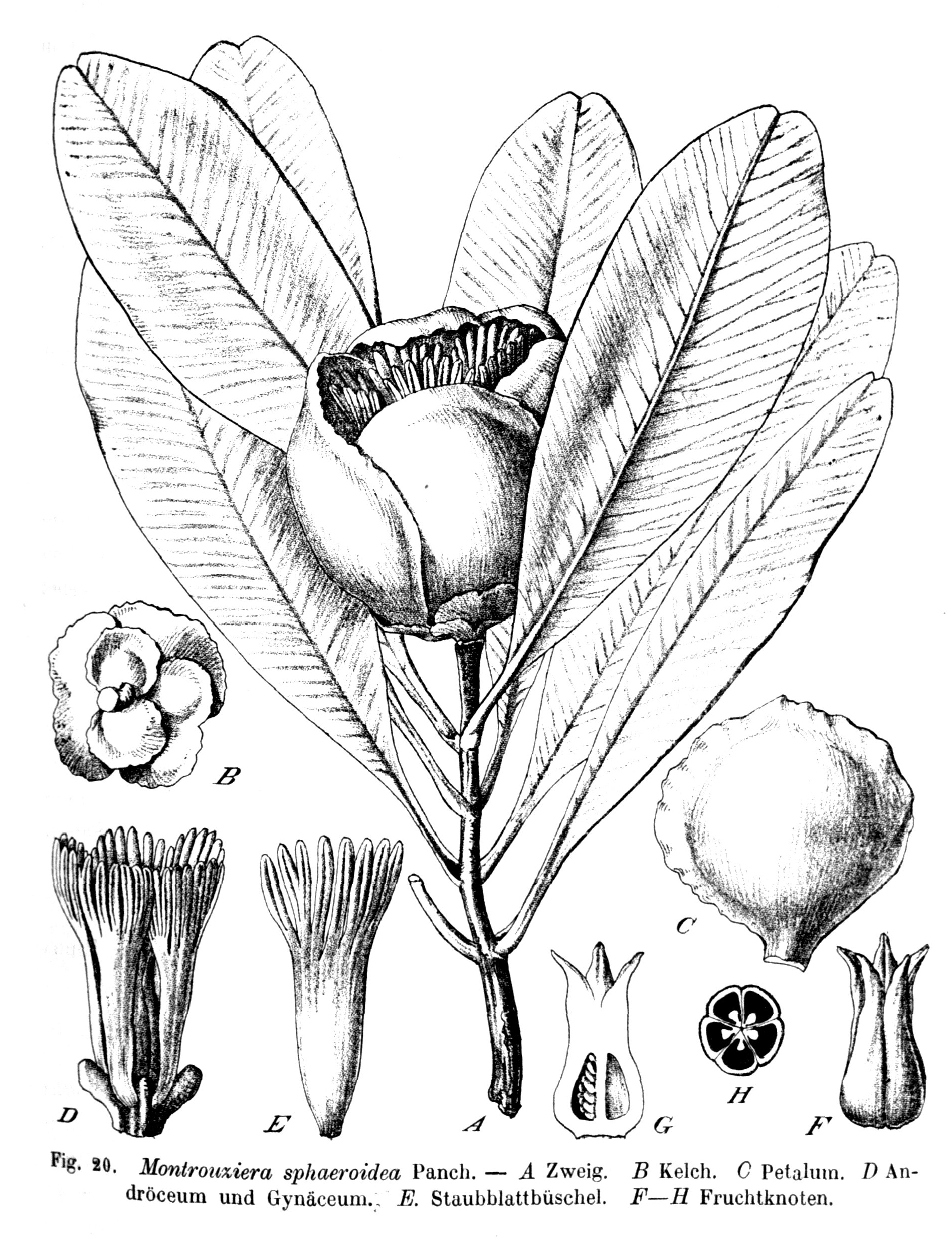
- Montrouziera sphaeroidea

Scientific classification
- Kingdom: Plantae
- Clade: Tracheophytes
- Clade: Angiosperms
- Clade: Eudicots
- Clade: Rosids
- Order: Malpighiales
- Family: Clusiaceae
- Tribe: Symphonieae
- Genus: Montrouziera; Pancher ex Planch. & Triana

Species
- Montrouziera cauliflora Planch. & Triana; Montrouziera gabriellae Baill.; Montrouziera rhodoneura Schltr.; Montrouziera sphaeroidea Pancher ex Planch. & Triana; Montrouziera spheriflora Pancher; Montrouziera verticillata Planch. & Triana

= Montrouziera =

Genus of flowering plants

Montrouziera is a genus of shrubs to large trees in the family Clusiaceae, endemic to New Caledonia. As usual in the Clusiaceae, species of this genus are known to contain xanthonoids. Montrouziera is related to the South American genus Platonia. Locally known as "houp", this genus was named after Xavier Montrouzier.

Montrouziera gabriellae is noted for bearing the largest endemic flower of New Caledonia.

== Species ==
Six species are accepted.

- Montrouziera cauliflora Planch. & Triana
- Montrouziera gabriellae Baill.
- Montrouziera rhodoneura Schltr.
- Montrouziera sphaeroidea Pancher ex Planch. & Triana
- Montrouziera spheriflora Pancher
- Montrouziera verticillata Planch. & Triana
