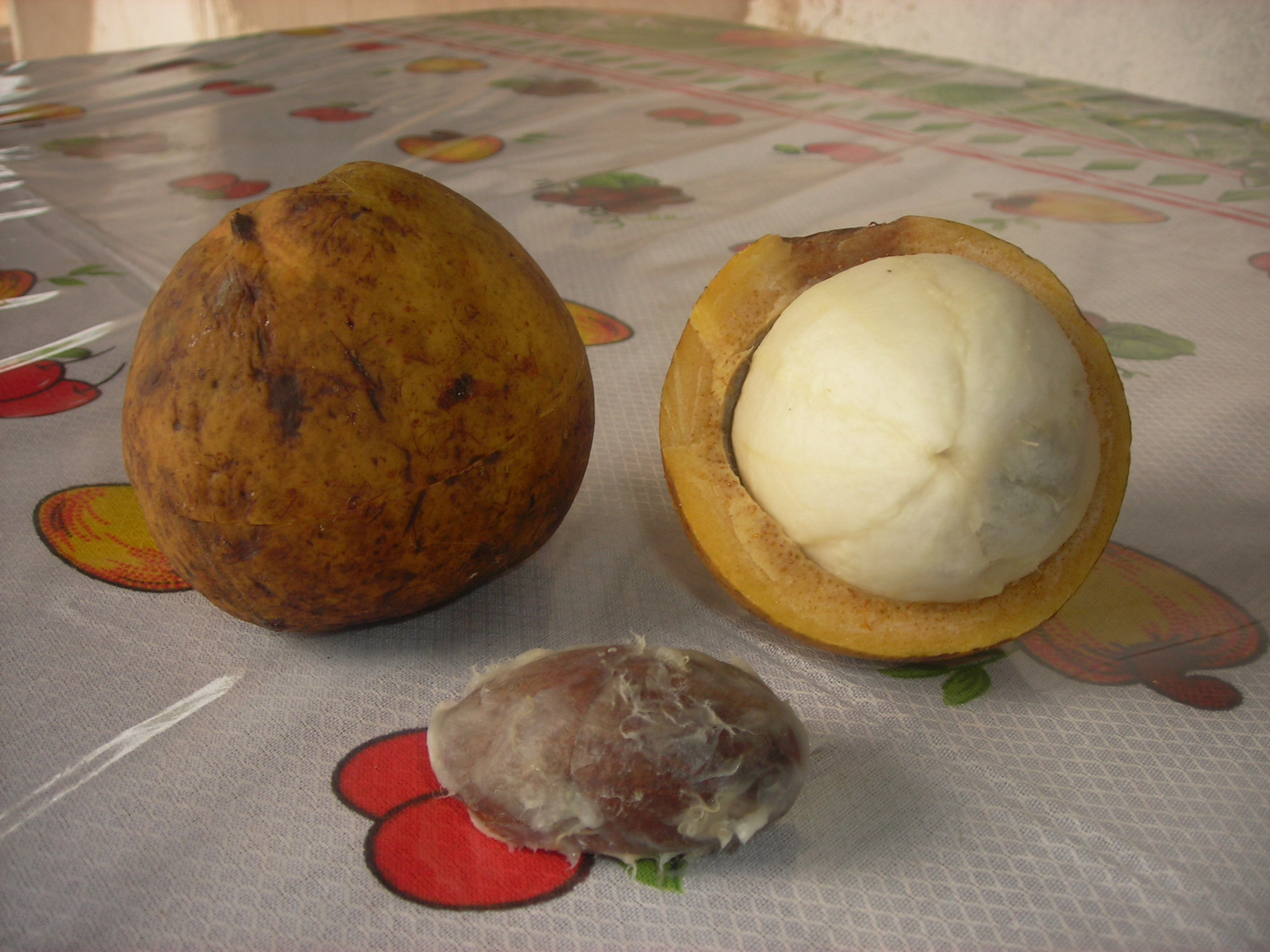

Scientific classification
- Kingdom: Plantae
- Clade: Tracheophytes
- Clade: Angiosperms
- Clade: Eudicots
- Clade: Rosids
- Order: Malpighiales
- Family: Clusiaceae
- Tribe: Symphonieae
- Genus: Platonia; Mart.
- Species: P. insignis

Binomial name
- Platonia insignis Mart.

Varieties
- Platonia insignis var. formosa R.E.Schult.; Platonia insignis var. insignis

Synonyms
- synonyms of Platonia: Aristoclesia Coville; synonyms of var. insignis: Aristoclesia esculenta (Arruda) Stuntz; Moronobea esculenta Arruda; Platonia esculenta (Arruda) Oken; Platonia grandiflora Planch. & Triana; Symphonia grandiflora Spreng.; Symphonia moronobea Raeusch.

= Platonia =

Genus of trees

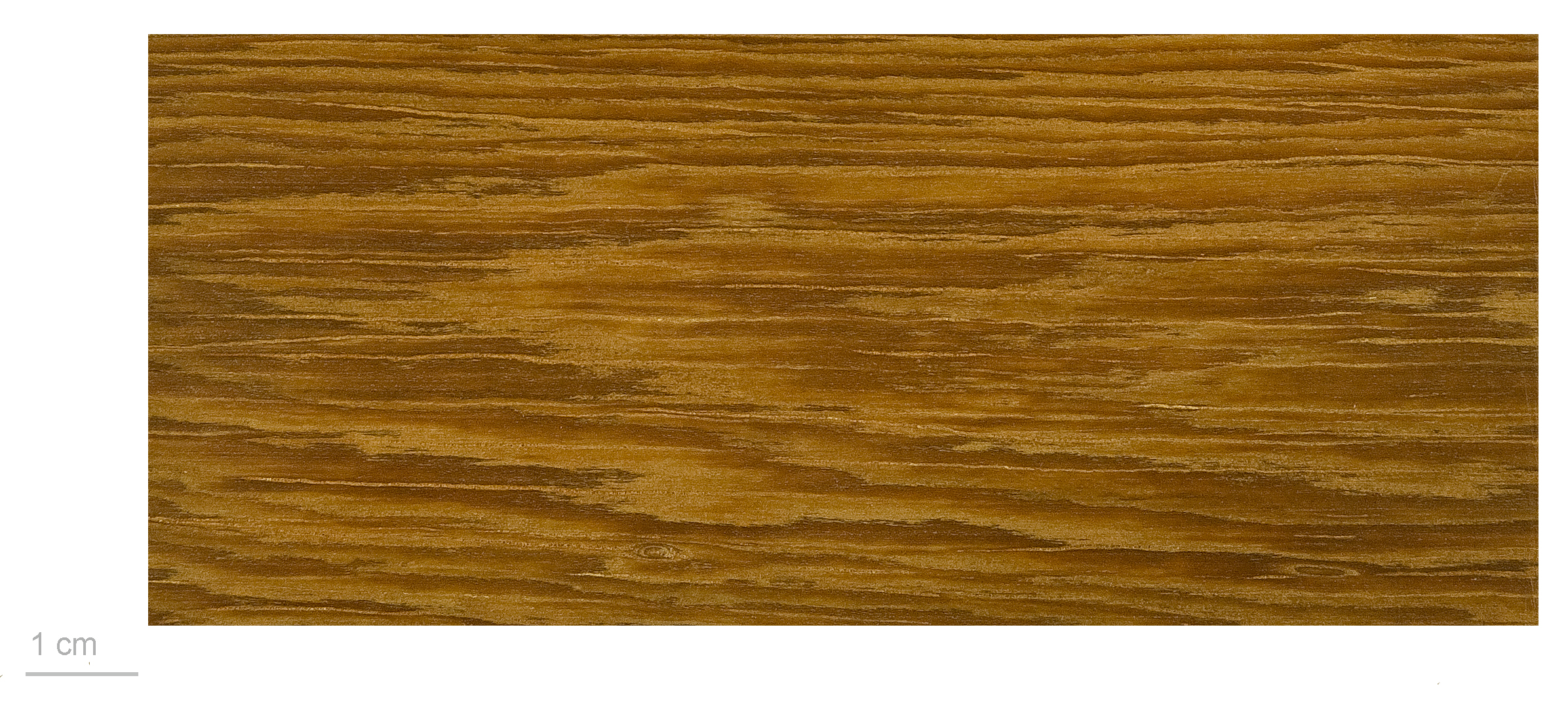
P. insignis wood

Platonia insignis is a species of tree of the family Clusiaceae, and the sole species of genus Platonia. It is native the Amazon rainforest in tropical South America, ranging through northern and northeastern Brazil, southeastern Colombia, southern Venezuela, and the Guianas. Common names include bacuri (and numerous variant spellings thereof; bacurí, bacury, bakuri, pacuri, pakuri, pakouri, packoeri, pakoeri), maniballi, naranjillo and bacurizeiro.

There was a degree of nomenclatural confusion, caused by Moronobea esculenta. If that were validly published for this species the current name would be Platonia esculenta. It was established that Moronobea esculenta is not a formal name (not "validly published"), so the name remains Platonia insignis.

Platonia is related to Montrouziera from New Caledonia.

== Description ==
Platonia insignis is a dry-season deciduous tree, reaching 25–40 m high. It has a pyramidal crown and copious yellow latex in the bark. The leaves are opposite, simple oblong to elliptic, 8–15 cm long, and glossy dark green, with wavy margins and a leathery texture.

The flowers are 5–7 cm long and pink in color, with five petals and numerous stamens. The fruit is round to oval and 7–14 cm long, with a thick, yellow skin. It resembles a papaya. The rind exudes a yellow latex when pressed. The sticky white pulp is fragrant, with a taste that is both sweet and sour. There are 3 to 5 seeds.

The white-bellied parrot (Pionites leucogaster) is a pollinator of the plant, making it ornithophilous.

== Cultivation and uses ==
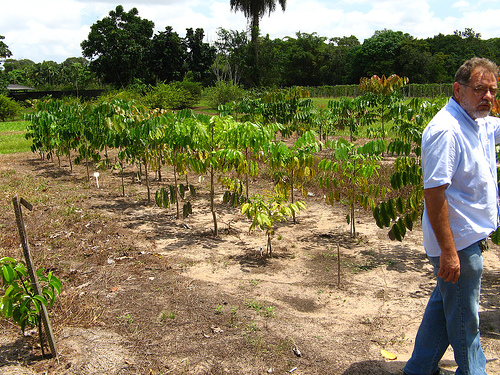
Bacuri plantation

The bacuri is grown for its fruit, which is made into various condiments and beverages. It contains high levels of phosphorus, iron, and vitamin C. The oily brown seeds are used as a home remedy to treat skin conditions. Its yellowish wood is frequently used as timber.

== Oil and butter ==
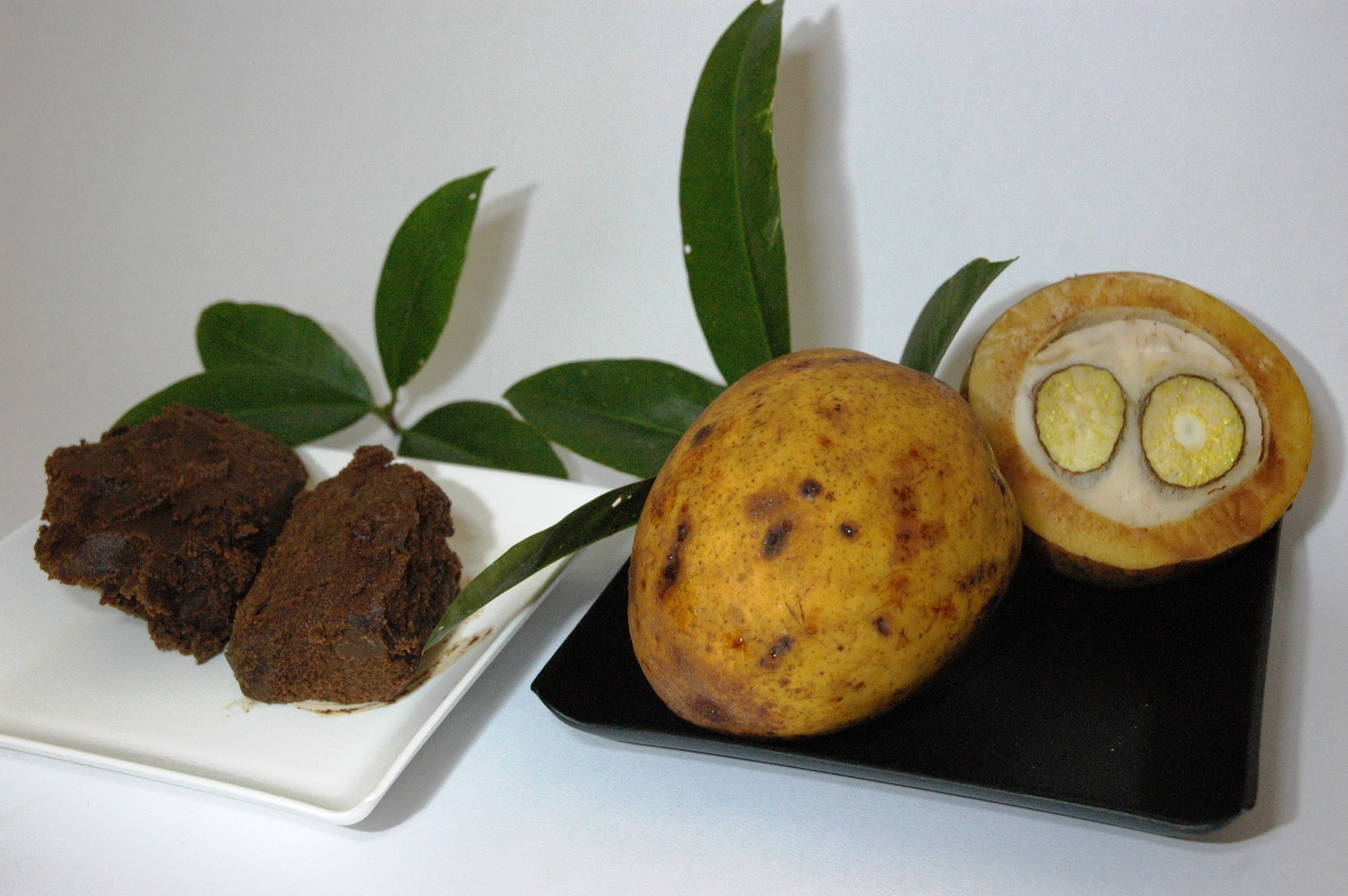
Bacuri butter

The grease of the bacuri oil has a high absorption rate, due to its high level of tripalmitin (50% to 55%), which penetrates the skin quickly. The high amount of fatty palmitoleic acid (5%), compared to other oils (less than or equal to 0.5 to 1.5%), makes the bacuri oil useful as an emollient and moisturizing agent.

Physico-chemical data

Index	Unit	Reference value
Iodine Index	gl2/100g	57
saponification index	mgKOH/g	211
acidity	mgKOH/g	10,71
Index peroxide	meq/Kg	5
Fusion point	°C	35

== Chemistry ==
Platonia is a natural source of trioxygenated xanthones. The latex contains resinotol.

== Bibliography ==
- Clement, Charles (2006). "Platonia esculenta bacuri". In Jules Janick, Robert Paull (ed.). The Encyclopedia of Fruit and Nuts. Cambridge, MA: CABI. pp. 269–272. ISBN 9780851996387.
- van Rijckevorsel, Paul (November 2002). "(1564) Proposal to Conserve the Name Platonia insignis against Moronobea esculenta (Guttiferae)". Taxon. 51 (4): 813–815. Bibcode:2002Taxon..51..813V. doi:10.2307/1555050. JSTOR 1555050.
- Kirkbride, Joseph H. (August 2007). "A 19th Century Brazilian botanical dictionary". Taxon. 56 (3): 927–937. doi:10.2307/25065874. JSTOR 25065874. Archived from the original on September 5, 2012.
