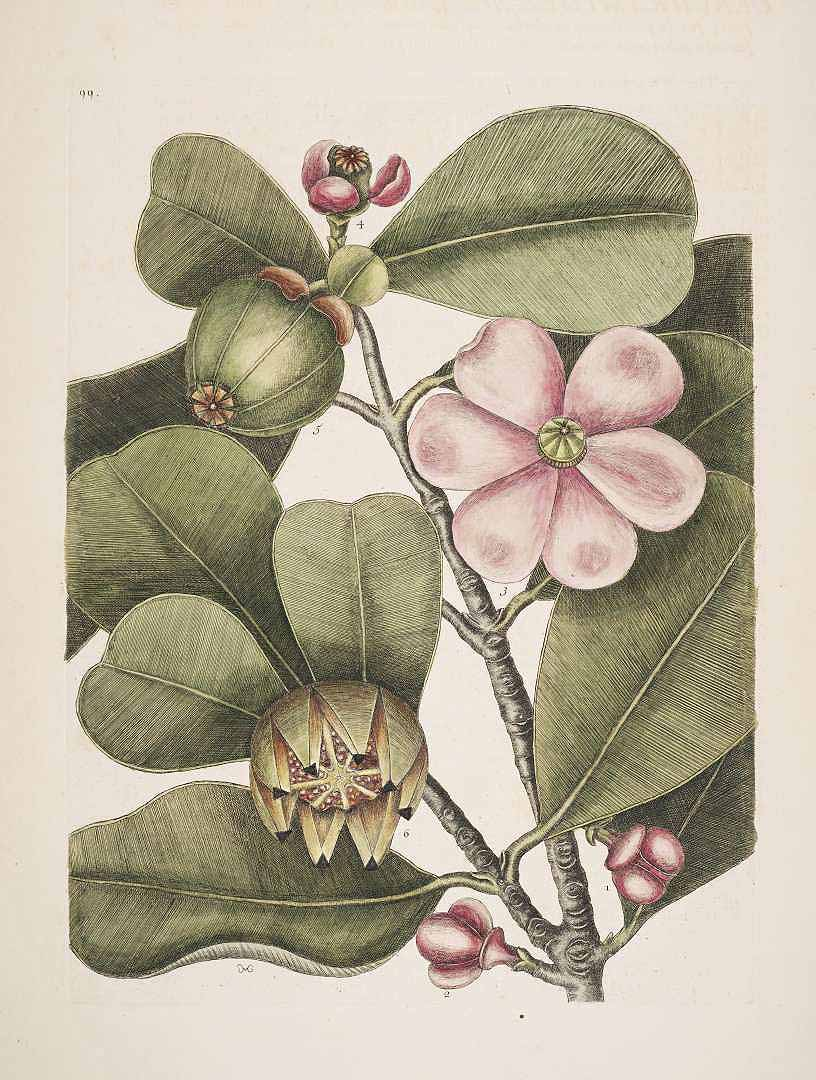
- Clusia rosea

Scientific classification
- Kingdom: Plantae
- Clade: Tracheophytes
- Clade: Angiosperms
- Clade: Eudicots
- Clade: Rosids
- Order: Malpighiales
- Family: Clusiaceae; Lindl.

Type genus
- Clusia

Synonyms
- Guttiferae

= Clusiaceae =

Clusiaceae Temporal range: Maastrichtian - recent Possible Turonian record

Family of mainly tropical flowering plants

The Clusiaceae or Guttiferae Juss. (1789) (nom. alt. et cons. = alternative and valid name) are a family of plants including 18 genera and ca 750 species. Several former members of Clusiaceae are now placed in Calophyllaceae and Hypericaceae. They are mostly trees and shrubs, with milky sap and fruits or capsules for seeds. The family is primarily tropical. More so than many plant families, it shows large variation in plant morphology (for example, three to 10 petals, which may be fused or unfused, and many other variable traits). According to the APG III, this family belongs to the order Malpighiales.

One feature sometimes found in this family, and rarely in others (e.g., Malpighiaceae), is providing pollinators with "pollination rewards" other than pollen or nectar; specifically, some species offer resin, which certain bees use in nest construction (each Clusiaceae species offers only one type of reward).

== Taxonomic history ==
The family Clusiaceae was divided by Cronquist into two subfamilies: the Clusioideae (typical subfamily) and the Hypericoideae. The latter was often treated as a family—the Hypericaceae or St. John's wort family. Elements of the Hypericoideae are more common in northern temperate areas and those of the Clusioideae are centered in the tropics.

Later classifications, however, divide the family in a finer way. Molecular studies have shown that the family Podostemaceae—the riverweeds—as well as the Bonnetiaceae are nested in this group. Their inclusions make the Clusiaceae in a wide sense polyphyletic, and Stevens's subfamilies need to be recognised at family level: Clusioideae as Clusiaceae sensu stricto; Hypericoideae as Hypericaceae; and Kielmeyeroideae as Calophyllaceae.

== Classification ==
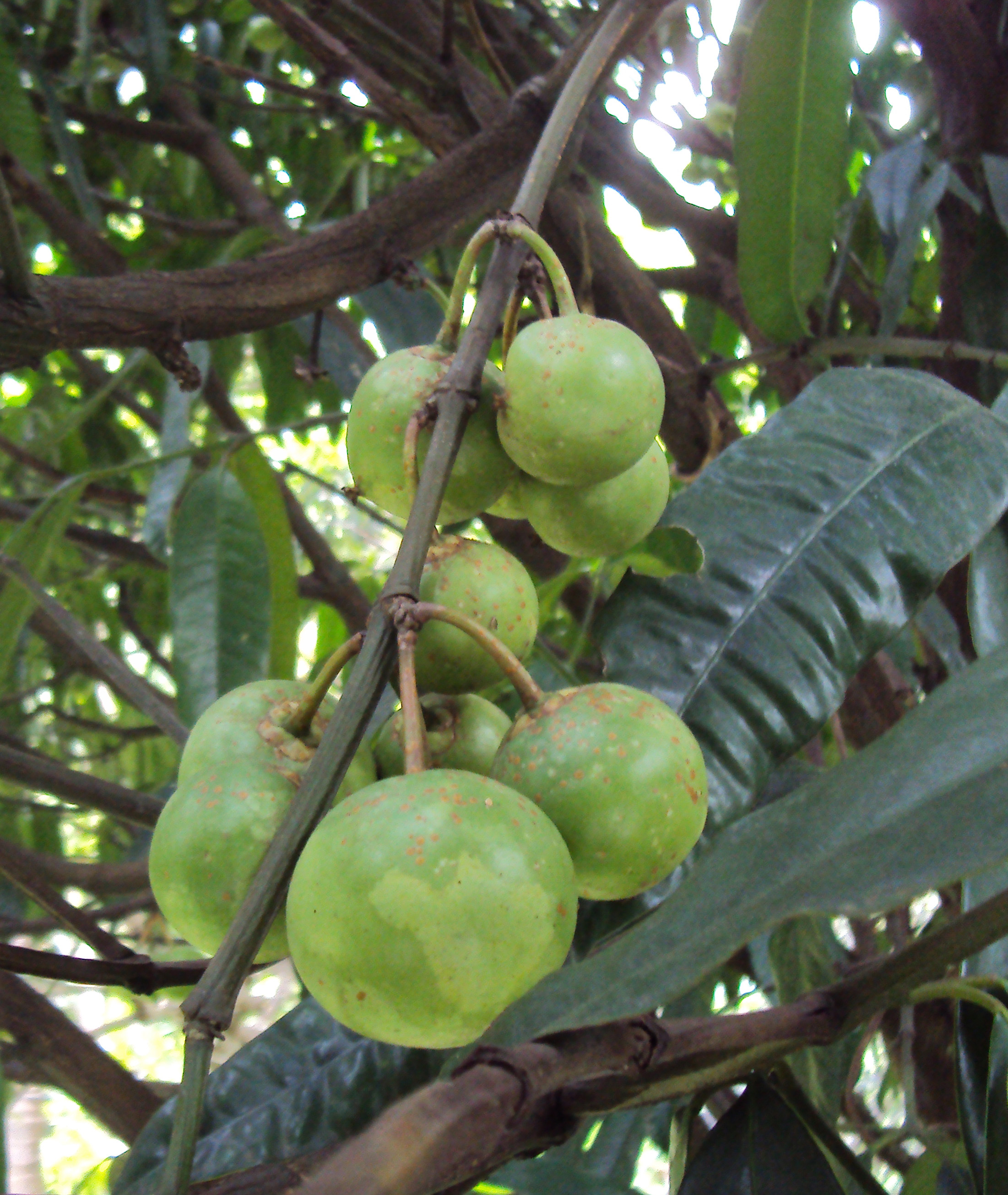
Garcinia tinctoria

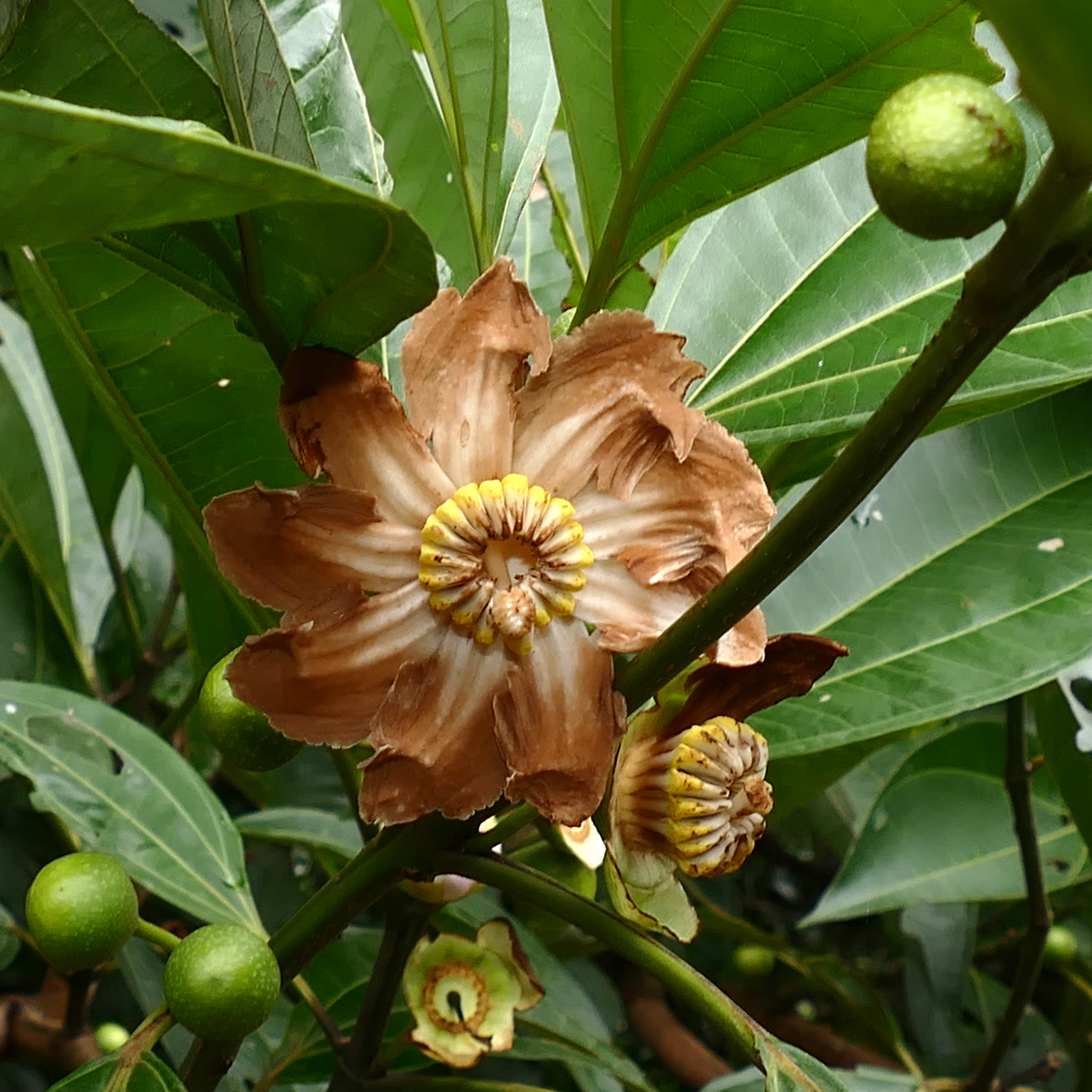
Clusia grandiflora

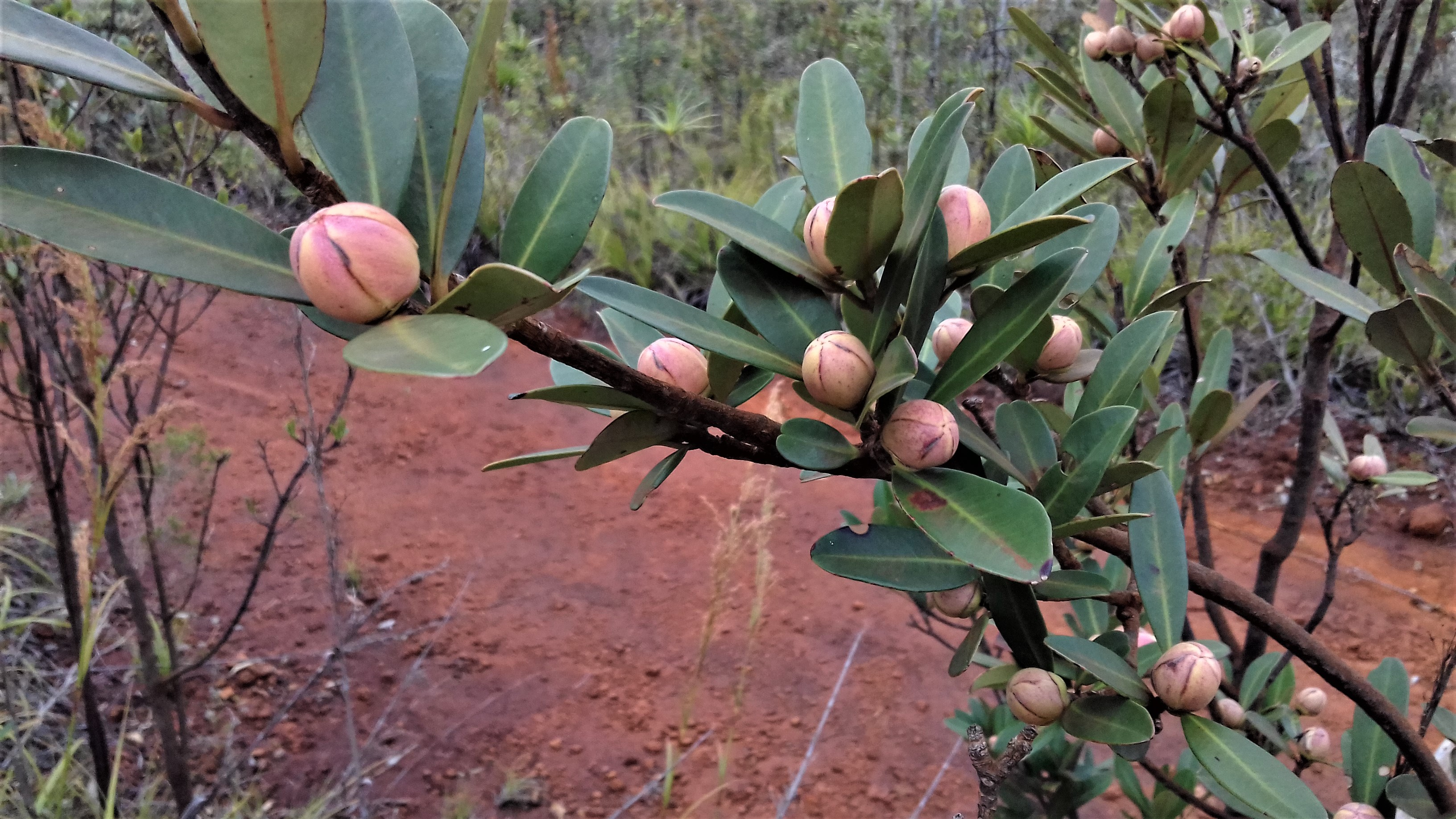
Montrouziera sphaeroidea

18 genera are accepted. The classification here follows Ruhfel et al. (2011)

Tribe Clusieae
- Arawakia L.Marinho
- Chrysochlamys Poepp.
- Clusia Plum. ex L.
- Dystovomita (Engl.) D'Arcy
- Tovomita Aubl.
- Tovomitopsis Planch. & Triana
Tribe Garcinieae
- Garcinia (synonyms include Allanblackia Oliv. and Rheedia L.) - saptree, mangosteen
Tribe Symphonieae
- Lorostemon Ducke
- Montrouziera Pancher ex Planch. & Triana
- Moronobea Aubl.
- Pentadesma Sabine
- Platonia Mart.
- Symphonia L.f.
- Thysanostemon Maguire
Tribe incertae sedis
- Havetiopsis Planch. & Triana
- Lebrunia Staner
- †Mammeoxylon
- Nouhuysia Lauterb.
- Quapoya Aubl.

== See also ==
- List of Clusiaceae genera

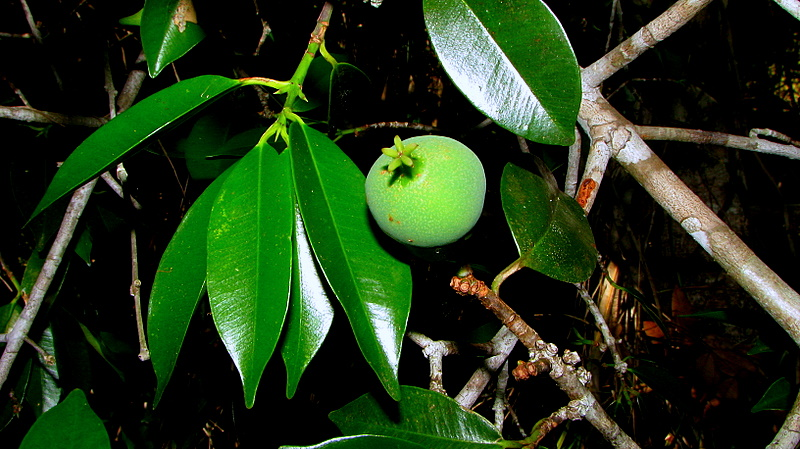
Symphonia globulifera

== Bibliography ==
- van Rijckevorsel, Paul (November 2002). "(1564) Proposal to Conserve the Name Platonia insignis against Moronobea esculenta (Guttiferae)". Taxon. 51 (4): 813–815. doi:10.2307/1555050. JSTOR 1555050.
