= Bikaverin =

Red fungal pigment produced by Fusarium species

Names
- IUPAC name 6,11-Dihydroxy-3,8-dimethoxy-1-methyl-7H-benzo[b]xanthene-7,10,12-trione
- Other names Lycopersin

Identifiers
CAS Number	33390-21-5
3D model (JSmol)	Interactive image
ChEBI	CHEBI:3096
ECHA InfoCard	100.230.205
PubChem CID	36433
UNII	F1N6BX58PJ
CompTox Dashboard (EPA)	DTXSID80187020
- InChI: Key: QXNACSREWQXWCV-UHFFFAOYSA-N
- SMILES: CC1=CC(=CC2=C1C(=O)C3=C(O2)C(=O)C4=C(C3=O)C(=CC(=C4O)OC)O)OC

Properties
Chemical formula	C_{20}H_{14}O_{8}
Molar mass	382.324 g·mol^{−1}
Appearance	Red solid
- Except where otherwise noted, data are given for materials in their standard state (at 25 °C [77 °F], 100 kPa). Infobox references

Bikaverin is a red polyketide pigment made by several fungi, most of them species of Fusarium. It is a tetracyclic benzoxanthone and was first characterised in 1971 from Gibberella fujikuroi, the fungus better known as the industrial source of gibberellins. Bikaverin kills some protozoa and oomycetes, is toxic to a range of tumour cell lines, and has been studied as a natural colourant. Its six-gene biosynthetic cluster is one of the better-understood fungal polyketide pathways.

== History ==
A red antibiotic named bikaverin was reported in 1970 by Balan and co-workers, who isolated it from Gibberella fujikuroi and found it active against Leishmania braziliensis. Its structure was settled the following year in three back-to-back papers in the Journal of the Chemical Society: John Cornforth's group at Shell described it as a "fungal vacuolation factor", a substance that made hyphae of other fungi form large vacuoles; de Boer and colleagues determined the crystal structure of its chloroform solvate; and Kjær, Bu'Lock and co-workers described bikaverin together with its demethyl analogue norbikaverin. In 1973 a pigment called lycopersin, isolated earlier from Fusarium oxysporum, was shown to be the same compound.

== Structure and properties ==
Bikaverin has the formula C_{20}H_{14}O_{8} and a linear four-ring benzo[b]xanthene skeleton bearing two hydroxyl groups, two methoxy groups, a methyl group and three carbonyls. The molecule is a tautomeric hydroxyquinone, and databases list it under two equivalent names, the 6,11-dihydroxy-7,10,12-trione and the 7,10-dihydroxy-6,11,12-trione. Bikaverin is red in the fungal mycelium and in solution; heating biomass that contains it turns the material blue by a mechanism that has not been explained.

== Occurrence and biosynthesis ==
Bikaverin has been isolated from Fusarium fujikuroi, F. oxysporum, F. verticillioides and other Fusarium species, and from the unrelated fungus Mycogone jaapii. Rare strains of the grey mould Botrytis cinerea carry a complete, functional bikaverin gene cluster that they acquired from Fusarium by horizontal gene transfer. In maize, bikaverin accumulates in kernels rotted by F. verticillioides and has been proposed as a chemical marker of ear rot.

The pigment is a product of a non-reducing polyketide synthase. The synthase gene, first identified as pks4 in F. fujikuroi in 2002, lies in a cluster of six genes, bik1 to bik6, that encode the synthase, an oxidase, a methyltransferase, a transporter, a transcription factor and a regulatory protein. Bikaverin production is switched on by nitrogen starvation and acidic pH and repressed by ammonium. Later work identified the pathway intermediates, including a previously unknown metabolite, oxo-pre-bikaverin. In 2020 the whole pathway was rebuilt in baker's yeast, Saccharomyces cerevisiae, reaching about 200 mg per litre in shake flasks.

== Biological activity ==
Bikaverin's earliest reported property was antiprotozoal activity against Leishmania. In the 1970s it was shown to uncouple oxidative phosphorylation in tumour cells and isolated rat-liver mitochondria and to be strongly haemolytic, and to interfere with purine nucleotide metabolism in Ehrlich ascites tumour cells. It is cytotoxic to a range of cancer cell lines, and in 2019 it was identified as an inhibitor of the human protein kinase CK2 with an IC_{50} of about 1.2 μM. Other reported effects include protection of cultured neurons against oxidative damage and activity against multidrug-resistant bacteria.

Against plant pathogens, bikaverin and fusaric acid from F. oxysporum inhibit the late-blight oomycete Phytophthora infestans, and bikaverin reduced tomato late blight by about 70 per cent in a greenhouse test. In the banana wilt pathogen F. oxysporum f. sp. cubense tropical race 4, bikaverin suppresses beneficial Bacillus bacteria in the root zone and so helps the fungus establish itself; a bikaverin-resistant Bacillus strain has been proposed as a biocontrol agent.

== Synthesis ==
The first total synthesis was reported by Derek Barton's group in 1975. Kato and co-workers published a second route in 1977, built around the rearrangement of an ortho-quinone to a para-quinone, and further syntheses followed from Hauser (1988), Bekaert (1992) and Anufriev (2018).
