= Penicillium sacculum =

Scientific classification
- Kingdom: Fungi
- Division: Ascomycota
- Class: Eurotiomycetes
- Order: Eurotiales
- Family: Aspergillaceae
- Genus: Penicillium
- Species: P. sacculum

Binomial name
- Penicillium sacculum Dale, E. 1926

Type strain
- ATCC 18350, BB298, CBS 231.61, IFO 8114, IFO 9454, IMI 051498, LSHB BB298, NBRC 8114, NBRC 9454, UC 4505

Synonyms
- Eladia saccula

Species of fungus

Penicillium sacculum is an anamorph species of fungus in the genus Penicillium which produces the xanthone 1-hydroxy-3-methoxy-6-sulfo-8-methylxanthone. Penicillium sacculum was isolated from the halophyte plant Atriplex
