= Tetrahydroxanthone =

Class of chemical compounds

Tetrahydroxanthones are natural products formally derived by partial reduction of xanthone. They are produced by various fungi, bacteria, and plants. Some are precursors to larger xanthone natural products. One example is neosartorin, composed of 5-acetylblennolide A and blennolide C, exhibits antibacterial activity against Gram-positive bacteria, notably including Staphylococcus aureus.

Chrysophanol is the common intermediate to most if not all tetrahydroxanthones.

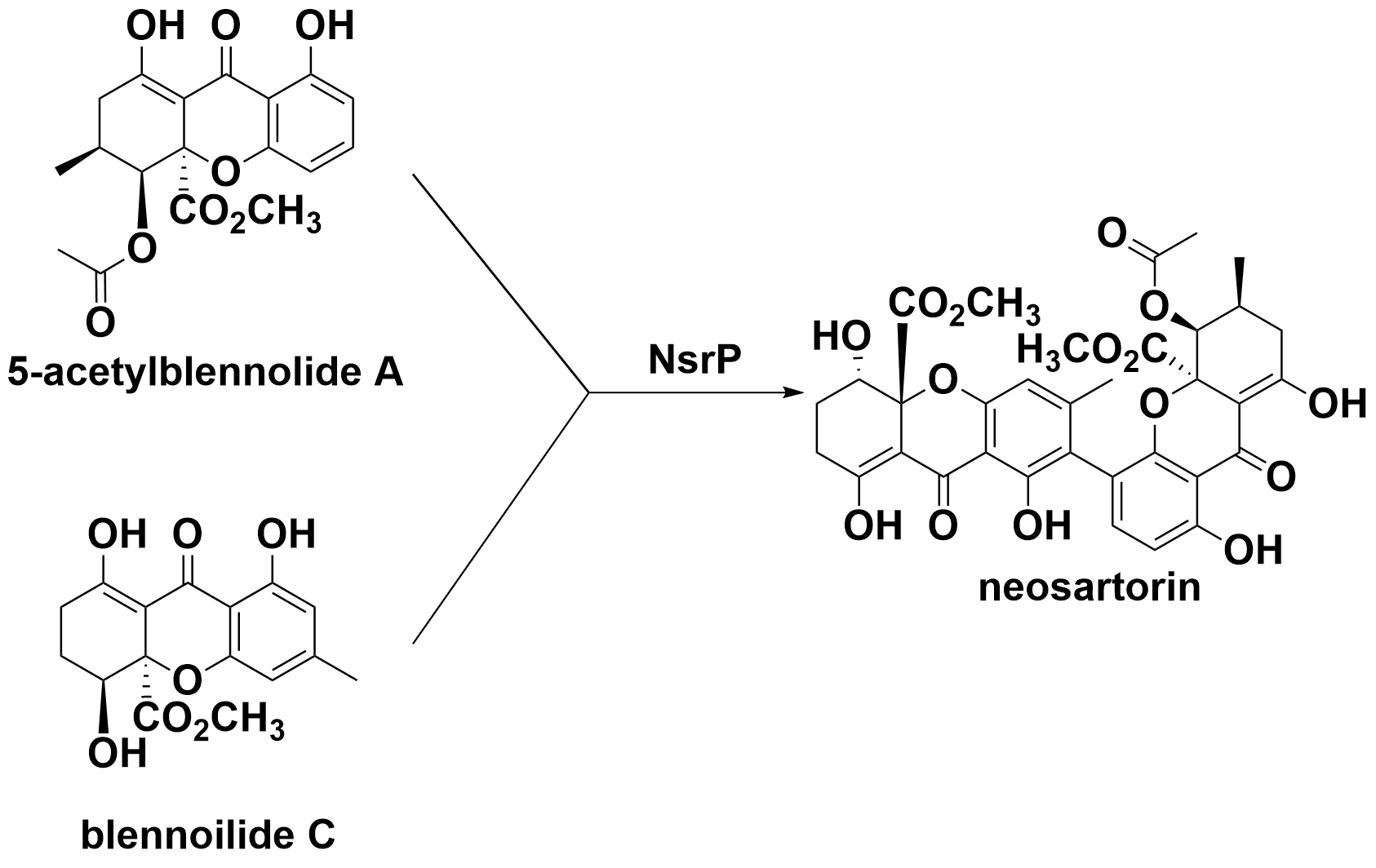
The biosynthesis of natural product neosartorin with NsrP using tetrahydroxanthones blennolide C and 5-acetylblennolide A natural product precursors.

The nsr cluster is a polyketide synthase gene responsible for the biosynthesis of neosartorin in A. novofumigatus. The enzyme NsrQ features a catalytic glutamic acid residue in the active site which protonates the enol produced by NsrK, leading to dearomatization.

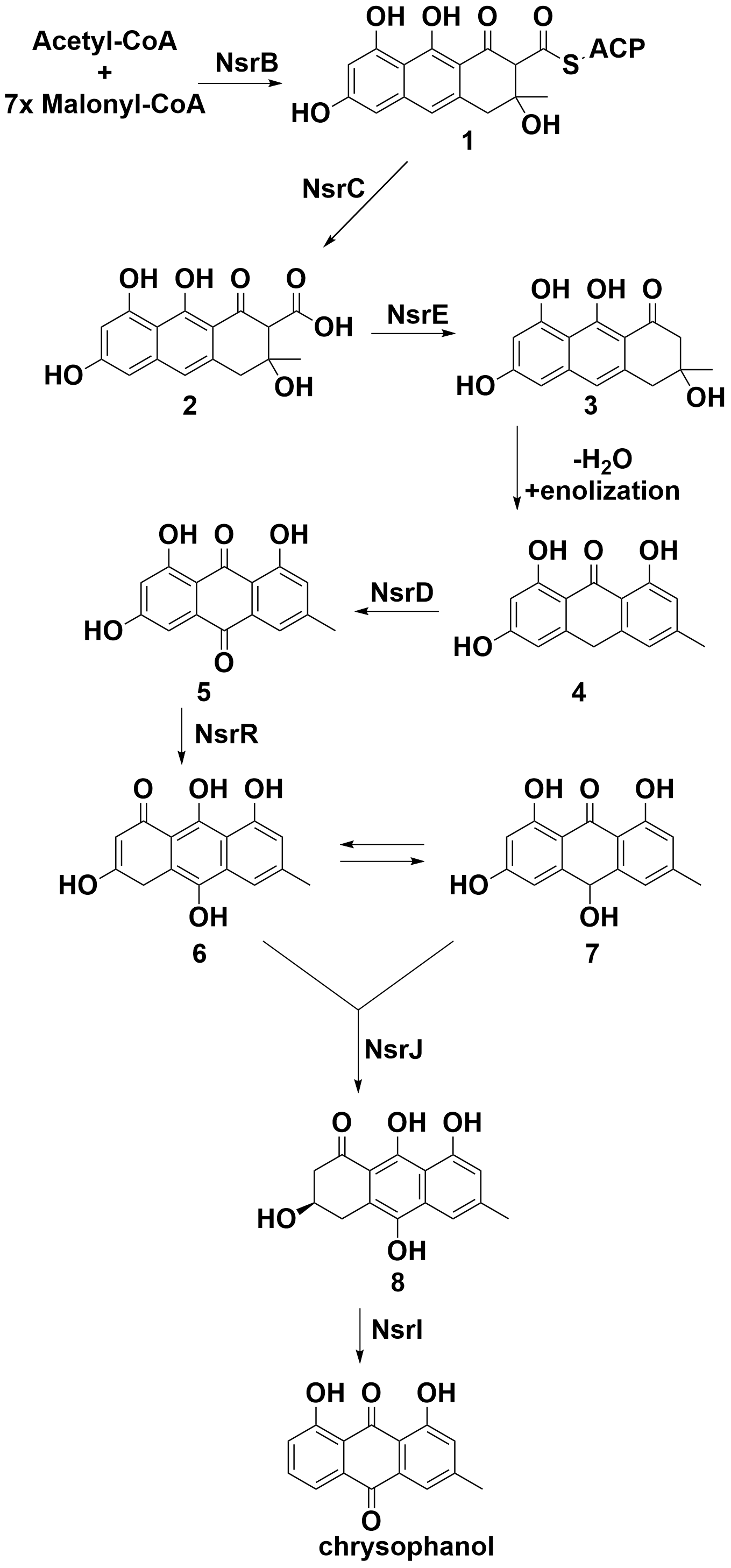
Biosynthesis of natural product chrysophanol. The anthraquinone serves as the common intermediate to tetrahydroxanthones.

The biosynthesis of tetrahydroxanthones begins with the synthesis of the anthraquinone chrysophanol (see figure). Once the final reduction and dehydration events take place (NsrJ and NsrI), chrysophanol is accepted into monooxygenase NsrF. A ring opening occurs upon the addition of water to the NsrF product 8 to give 9. NsrG, a methyltransferase, then converts the carboxylic acid into an ester, giving 10 as the product. NsrK, a flavin-dependent monooxygenase, the installs an alcohol ortho- to the ester and methyl groups, breaking the aromaticity of the compound. NsrQ, an NADPH dependent ketoreductase, then isomerizes the methyl group to form 12 and 14. The two isomers are then acted upon by either NsrO and CPUR_05418 or just NsrO to give (-)-blennolide B and blennolide A. Further transformation of blennolide A by NsrL yields the precursor natural product 5-actelyblennolide A.

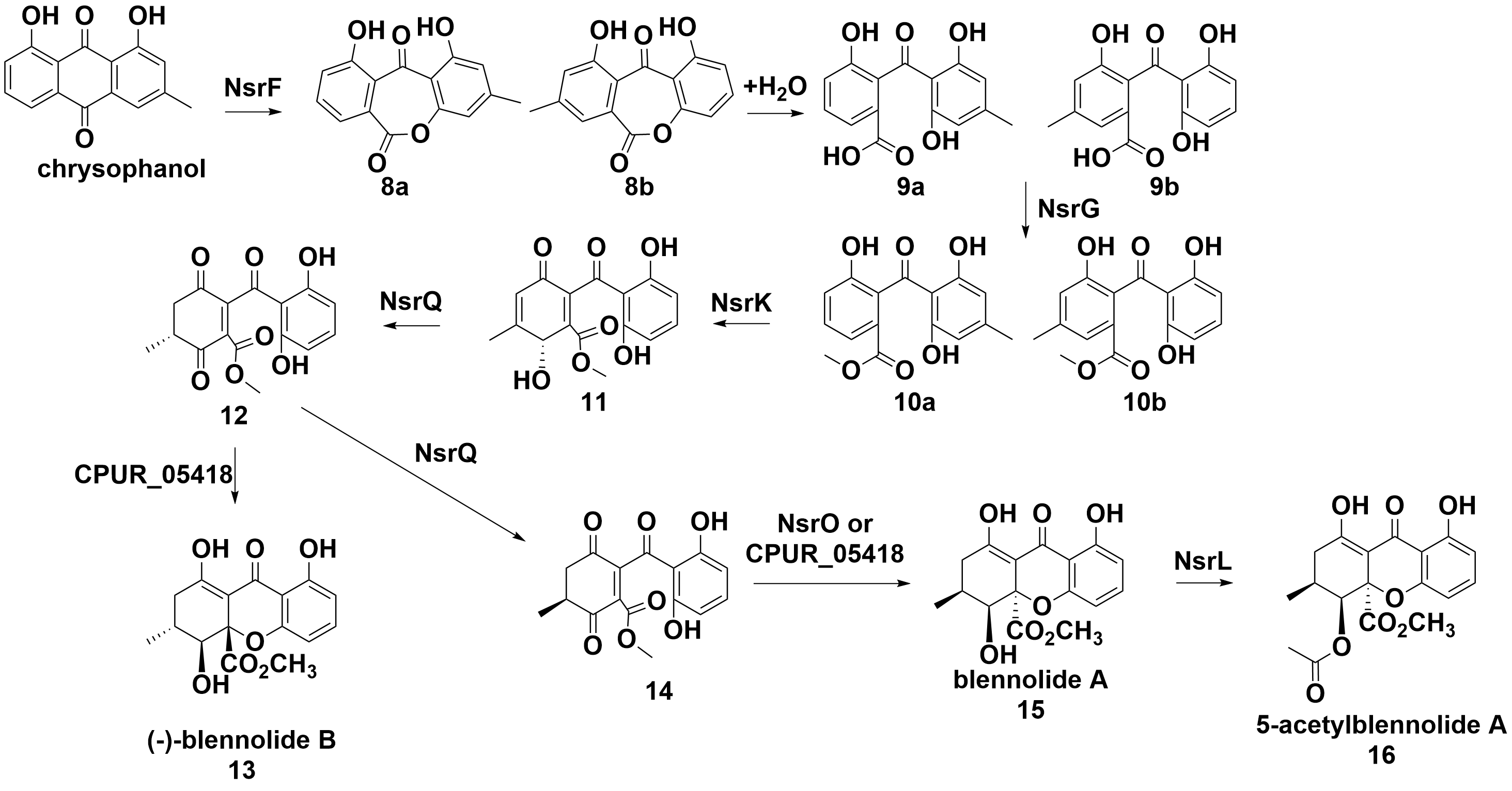
