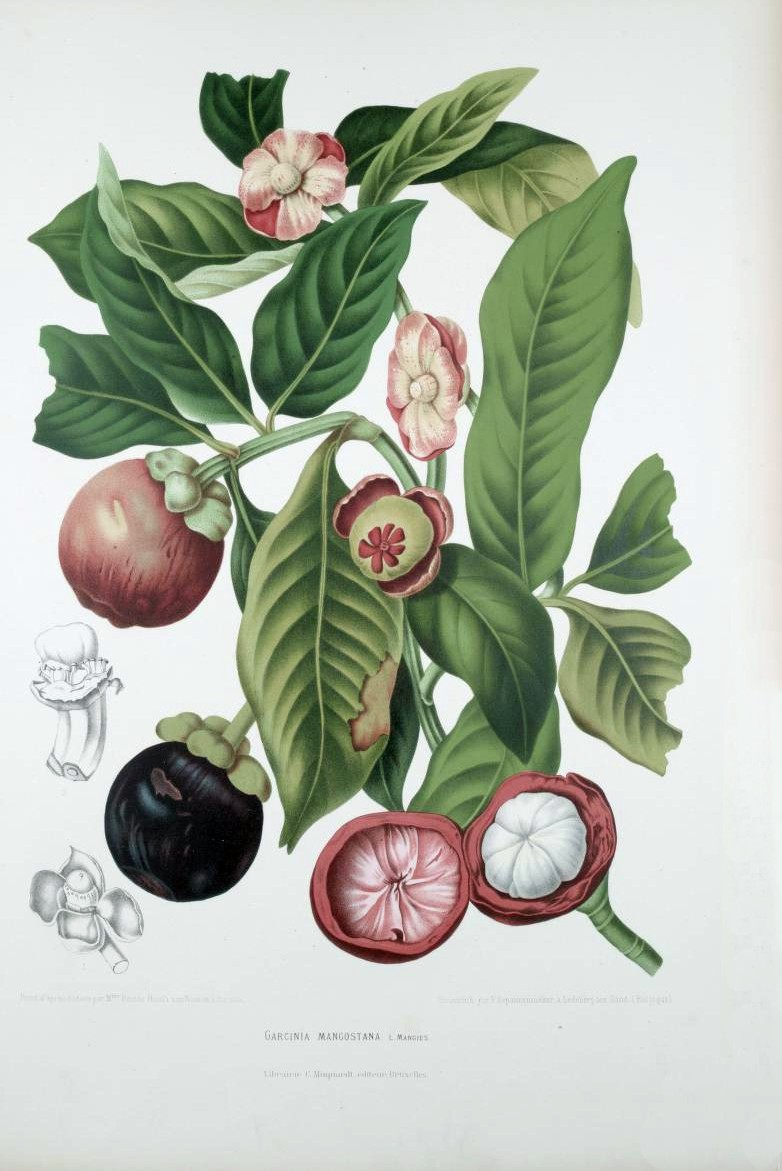
- Illustration from Fleurs, Fruits et Feuillages Choisis de l'Ile de Java 1863–1864 by Berthe Hoola van Nooten (Pieter De Pannemaeker lithographer)
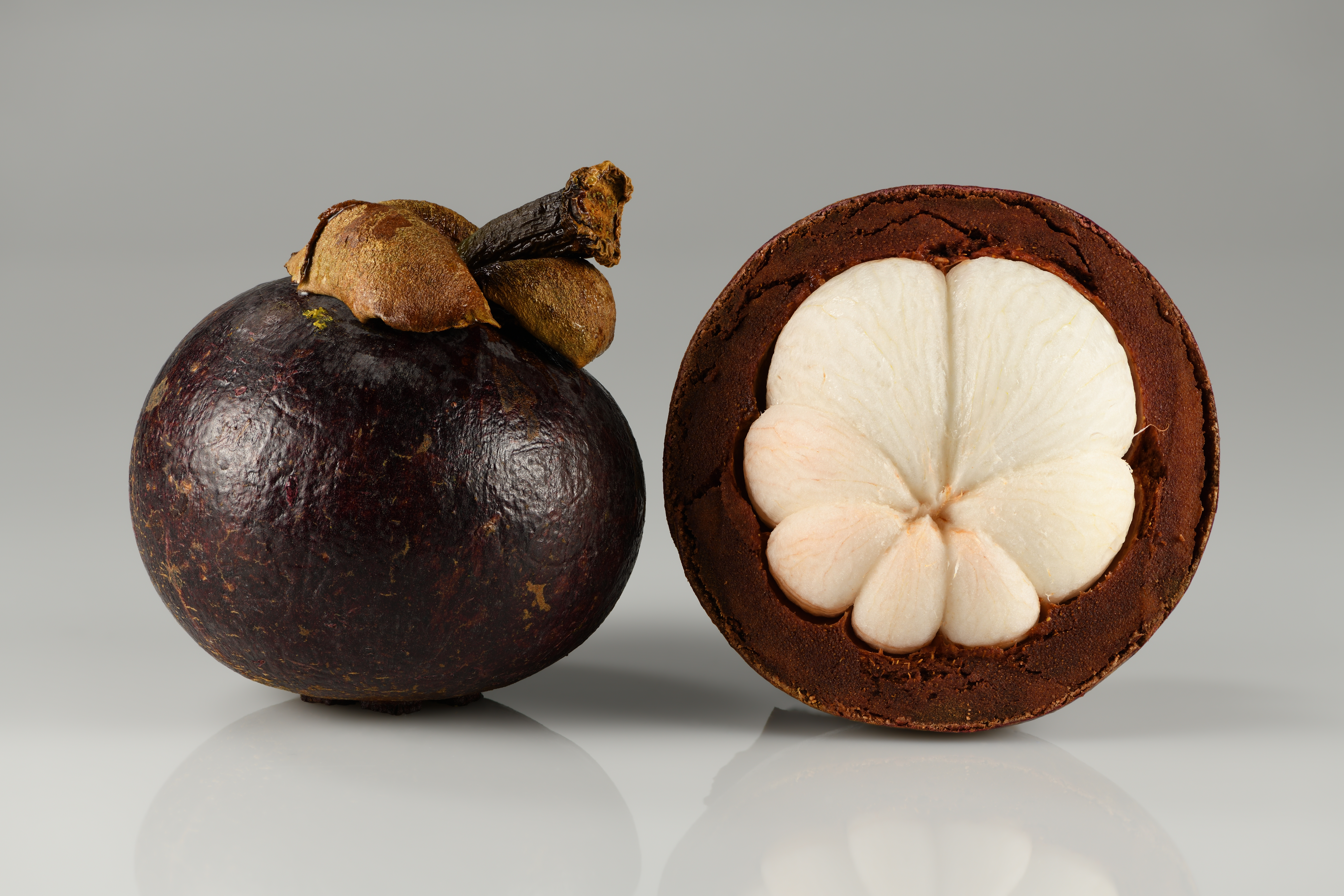
- Whole fruit and horizontal cross-section

Conservation status
- Data Deficient (IUCN 3.1)

Scientific classification
- Kingdom: Plantae
- Clade: Tracheophytes
- Clade: Angiosperms
- Clade: Eudicots
- Clade: Rosids
- Order: Malpighiales
- Family: Clusiaceae
- Genus: Garcinia
- Species: G. mangostana

Binomial name
- Garcinia mangostana L.

Synonyms
- Mangostana garcinia Gaertn

= Mangosteen =

Tropical evergreen tree with edible fruit

Mangosteen (Garcinia mangostana), also called mangostan or purple mangosteen, is a tropical evergreen tree growing from 6 to 25 metres (20 to 82 feet) tall. The edible endocarp of the fruit is encased in an inedible purplish rind.

The species is native to the Malay Peninsula and Borneo. It has been cultivated extensively in tropical Asia since ancient times. It is grown mainly in Southeast Asia, southwest India and other tropical areas such as Colombia, Puerto Rico, and Florida.

== Description ==
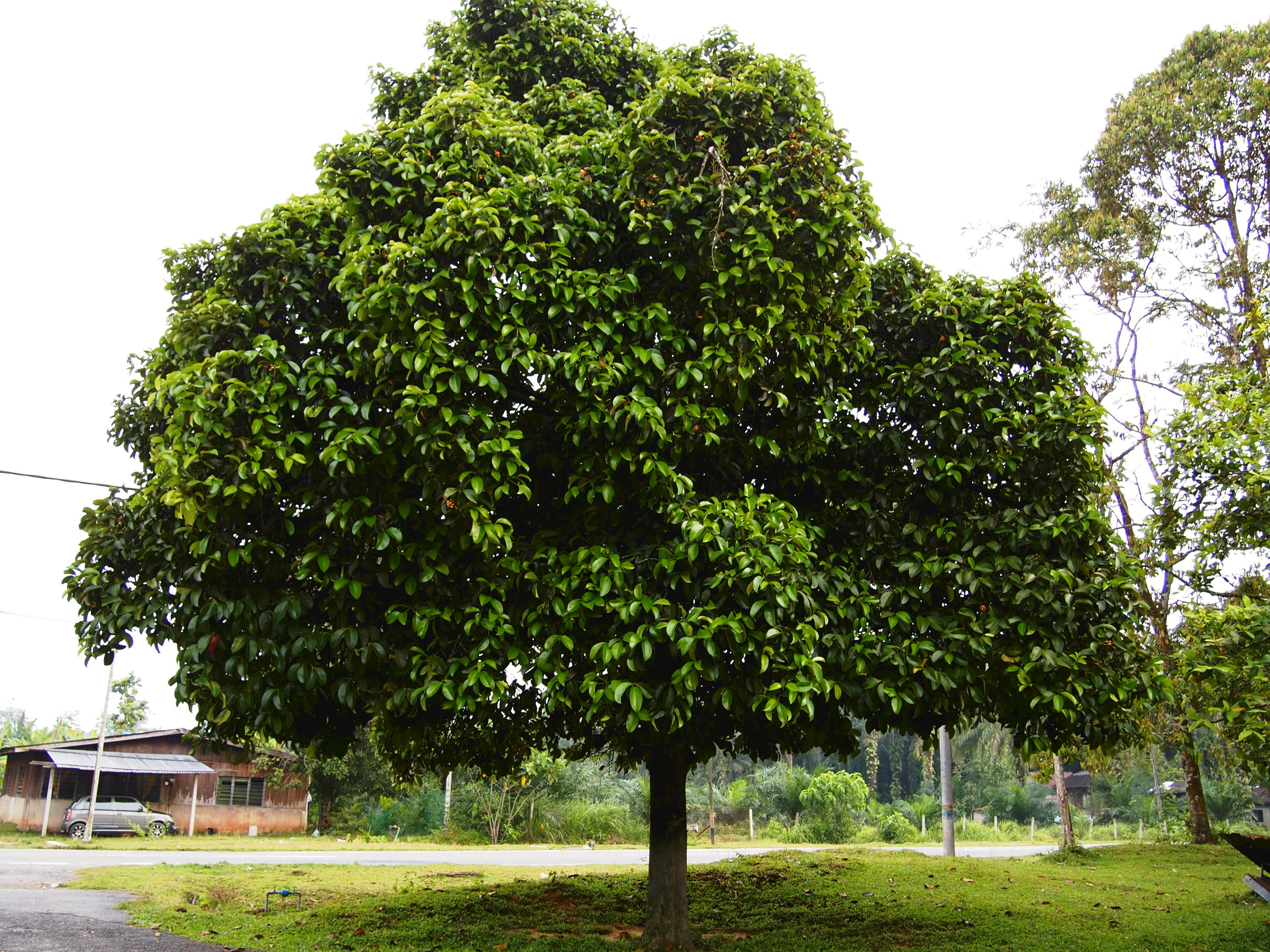
Mangosteen tree

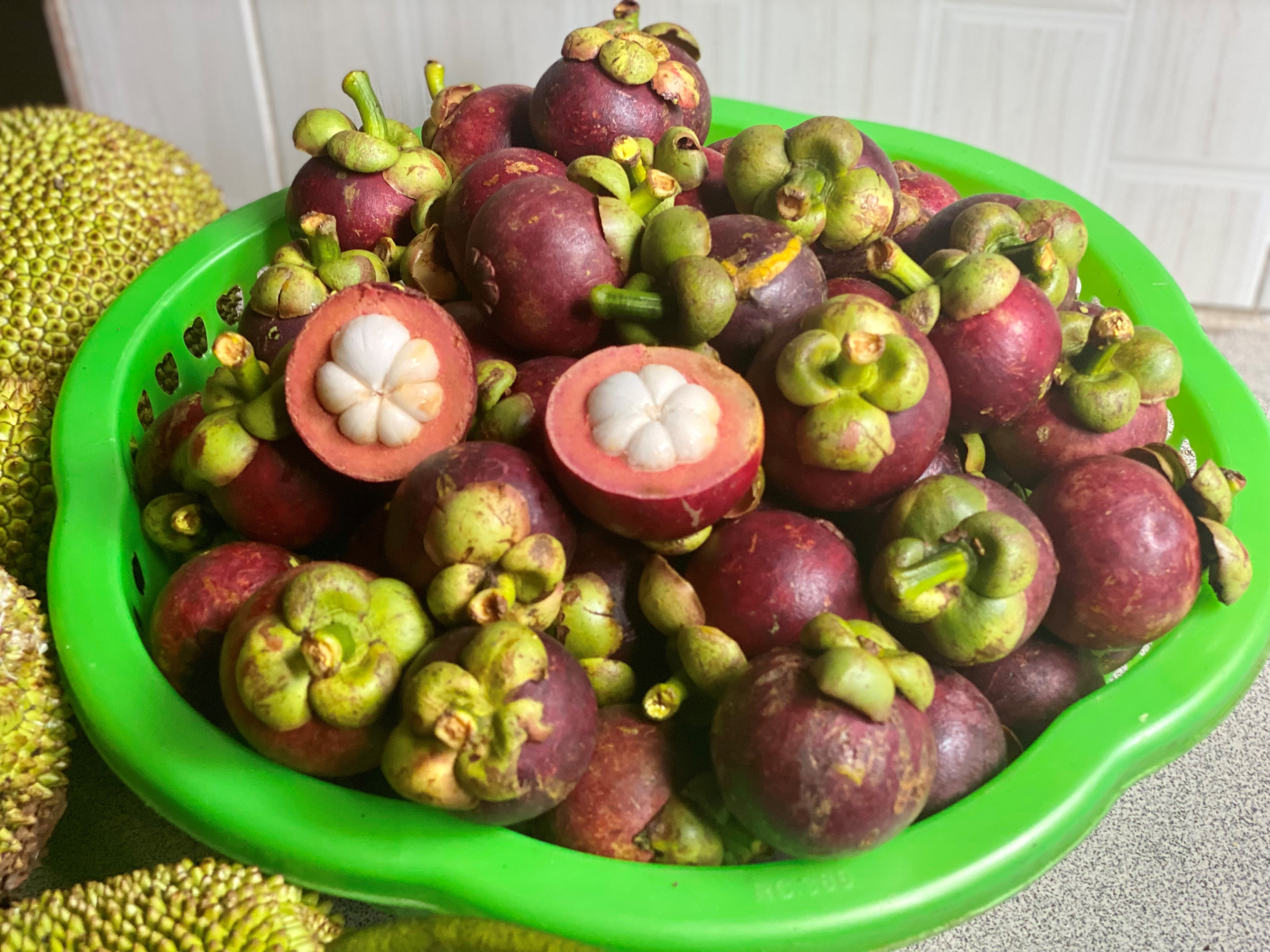
Basket of fresh mangosteens

The tree grows from 6 to 25 metres (20 to 82 feet) tall. The fruit of the mangosteen is sweet and tangy, juicy, somewhat fibrous, with fluid-filled vesicles and an inedible, deep reddish-purple colored rind (exocarp) when ripe. The fragrant edible flesh that surrounds each seed is the endocarp, i.e., the inner layer of the ovary.

The juvenile mangosteen fruit, which does not require fertilisation to form (see agamospermy), first appears as pale green or almost white in the shade of the canopy. As the fruit enlarges over the next two to three months, the exocarp colour deepens to darker green. During this period, the fruit increases in size until its exocarp is 6–8 cm (2 1/2–3 in) in outside diameter, remaining hard until a final, abrupt ripening stage.

The subsurface chemistry of the mangosteen exocarp comprises an array of polyphenols, including xanthones and tannins that assure astringency which discourages infestation by insects, fungi, plant viruses, bacteria, and animal predation while the fruit is immature. Colour changes and softening of the exocarp are natural processes of ripening that indicate the fruit can be eaten and the seeds have finished developing.

Once the developing mangosteen fruit has stopped expanding, chlorophyll synthesis slows as the next colour phase begins. Initially streaked with red, the exocarp pigmentation transitions from green to red to dark purple, indicating a final ripening stage. This entire process takes place over a period of ten days as the edible quality of the fruit peaks. Over the days following removal from the tree, the exocarp hardens to an extent depending upon post-harvest handling and ambient storage conditions, especially relative humidity levels. If the ambient humidity is high, exocarp hardening may take a week or longer when the flesh quality is peaking and excellent for consumption. However, after several additional days of storage, especially if unrefrigerated, the flesh inside the fruit might spoil without any obvious external indications. Using the hardness of the rind as an indicator of freshness for the first two weeks following harvest is therefore unreliable because the rind does not accurately reveal the interior condition of the flesh. If the exocarp is soft and yielding as it is when ripe and fresh from the tree, the fruit is usually good.

The edible endocarp of the mangosteen has the same shape and size as a tangerine 4–6 cm (1 1/2–2 1/2 in) in diameter, but is white. The number of fruit segments corresponds exactly with the number of stigma lobes on the exterior apex; accordingly, a higher number of fleshy segments also corresponds with the fewest seeds. The circle of wedge-shaped segments contains 4–8, rarely 9 segments, the larger ones harbouring the apomictic seeds that are unpalatable unless roasted. The seeds are of similar size and shape to almonds. As a non-climacteric fruit, picked mangosteen does not ripen further, so it must be consumed shortly after harvest.

Often described as a subtle delicacy, the flesh bears an exceptionally mild aroma, quantitatively having about 1/400th of the chemical constituents of fragrant fruits, explaining its relative mildness. The main volatile components having caramel, grass and butter notes as part of the mangosteen fragrance are hexyl acetate, hexenol and α-copaene. Ethyl octanoate, ethyl hexanoate and 3-methyl-2-butene-1-thiol were detected as aroma components in mangosteen wine.

=== Related species ===
The genus Garcinia also contains several less-known fruit-bearing species, such as the button mangosteen (G. prainiana) and the charichuelo (G. madruno).

== Origins and history ==
Cultivated mangosteen (Garcinia mangostana var. mangostana) is dioecious, but male trees are unknown. The trees produce viable seeds via apomixis, where all the embryos are essentially clones of the mother. Its extensive cultivation has made its original native range difficult to ascertain. G. mangostana var. mangostana is likely to be the domesticated descendant of wild populations of G. mangostana var. malaccensis (previously thought to be a separate species) and G. mangostana var. borneensis, native to the Malay Peninsula and Borneo respectively. Both of these wild varieties still possess male trees, unlike the domesticated mangosteen. It may have also hybridized to a limited extent with closely related species, including G. penangiana and G. venulosa.

Mangosteens are highly valued for their juicy, delicate texture and slightly sweet and sour flavor. The mangosteen has been cultivated extensively in tropical Asia since ancient times, including in Malaysia, Sri Lanka, Borneo, Sumatra, Mainland Southeast Asia, and the Philippines. The 15th-century Chinese record Yingya Shenglan described mangosteen as mang-chi-shih (derived from Malay manggis), a native plant of Southeast Asia of white flesh with a delectable sweet and sour taste.

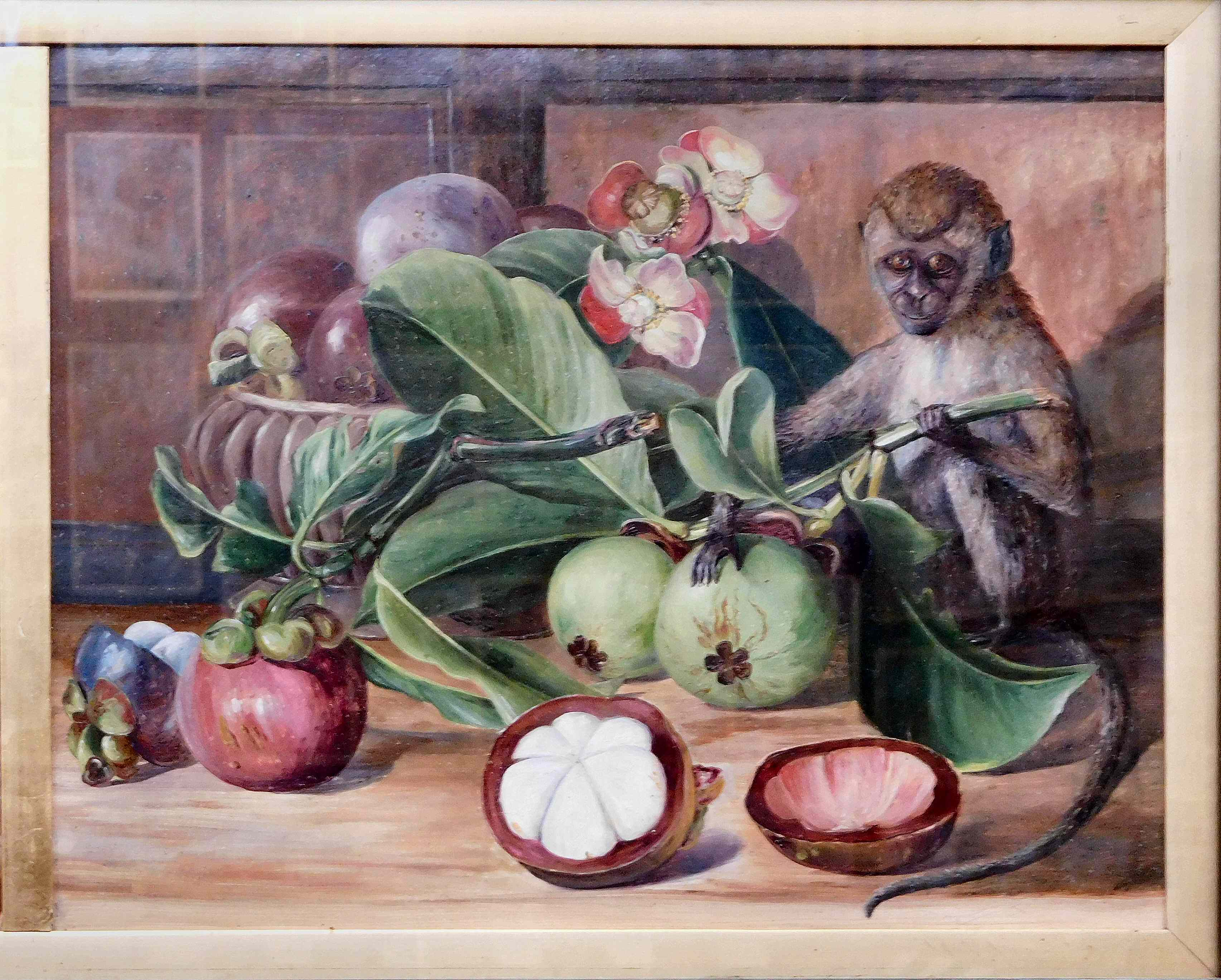
Flowers and fruit of the mangosteen, and Singapore monkey, by Marianne North, before 1890

A description of mangosteen was included in the Species Plantarum by Carl Linnaeus in 1753. The mangosteen was introduced into English greenhouses in 1855. Subsequently, its culture was introduced into the Western Hemisphere, where it became established in West Indies islands, especially Jamaica. It was later established on the American mainland in Guatemala, Honduras, Panama, and Ecuador. The mangosteen tree generally does not grow well outside the tropics.

In Southeast Asia, mangosteen is commonly known as the "Queen of Fruits", and is frequently paired with durian, the "King of Fruits". In Chinese food therapy, mangosteen is considered "cooling", making it a good counterbalance to the "heaty" durian. There is also a legend about Queen Victoria offering a reward of one hundred pounds sterling to anyone who could deliver a fresh mangosteen to her. Although this legend can be traced to a 1930 publication by the fruit explorer David Fairchild, it is not substantiated by any known historical document.

The journalist and gourmet R. W. Apple Jr. once said of the fruit, "No other fruit, for me, is so thrillingly, intoxicatingly luscious...I'd rather eat one than a hot fudge sundae, which for a big Ohio boy is saying a lot." It is grown mainly in Southeast Asia, southwest India and other tropical areas such as Colombia, Puerto Rico and Florida, where the tree has been introduced. Since 2006, private small-volume orders for fruits grown in Puerto Rico have been sold to American specialty food stores and gourmet restaurants who serve the flesh segments as a delicacy dessert.

== Propagation, cultivation and harvest ==
Mangosteen is usually propagated by seedlings. Vegetative propagation is difficult and seedlings are more robust and reach fruiting earlier than vegetatively propagated plants.

Mangosteen produces a recalcitrant seed which is not a true seed strictly defined, but rather described as a nucellar asexual embryo. As seed formation involves no sexual fertilization, the seedling is genetically identical to the mother plant. If allowed to dry, a seed dies quickly, but if soaked, seed germination takes between 14 and 21 days when the plant can be kept in a nursery for about 2 years growing in a small pot.

When the trees are approximately 25–30 cm (10–12 in), they are transplanted to the field at a spacing of 20–40 m (66–131 ft). After planting, the field is mulched in order to control weeds. Transplanting takes place in the rainy season because young trees are likely to be damaged by drought. Because young trees need shade, intercropping with banana, plantain, rambutan, durian or coconut leaves is effective. Coconut palms are mainly used in areas with a long dry season, as palms also provide shade for mature mangosteen trees. Another advantage of intercropping in mangosteen cultivation is the suppression of weeds.

The growth of the trees is slowed if the temperature is below 20 °C (68 °F). The ideal temperature range for growing and producing fruits is 25–35 °C (77–95 °F) with relative humidity over 80%. The maximal temperature is 38–40 °C (100–104 °F), with both leaves and fruit being susceptible to scorching and sunburn, while the minimum temperature is 3–5 °C (37–41 °F). Young seedlings prefer a high level of shade and mature trees are shade-tolerant. The tree must be grown in consistently warm conditions, as exposure to temperatures below 0 °C (32 °F) for prolonged periods will usually kill a mature plant. They are known to recover from brief cold spells rather well, often with damage only to young growth. Experienced horticulturists have grown this species outdoors, and brought them to fruit in extreme south Florida.

Mangosteen trees have a weak root system and prefer deep, well-drained soils with high moisture content, often growing on riverbanks. The mangosteen is not adapted to limestone soils, alluvial soils, or sandy soils with low organic matter content. Mangosteen trees need a well-distributed rainfall over the year (<40 mm/month) and a 3–5 week dry season.

Mangosteen trees are sensitive to water availability and application of fertilizer input which is increased with the age of trees, regardless of region. Maturation of mangosteen fruits takes 5–6 months, with harvest occurring when the pericarps are purple.

=== Breeding ===
In the breeding of perennial mangosteen, the selection of rootstock and grafting are significant issues to overcome constraints to production, harvesting, or seasonality. Most of the genetic resources for breeding are in germplasm collections, whereas some wild species are cultivated in Malaysia and the Philippines. Conservation methods are chosen because storage of seeds under dried and low-temperature conditions has not been successful.

Because of the long duration until the trees yield fruits and the long resulting breeding cycles, mangosteen breeding has not proven attractive for transplanting or research. Breeding objectives that may enhance mangosteen production include:

- Drought tolerance, especially sensitivity to drought in the first 5 years after germination
- Tree architecture to produce a tree with a crown that is regular and pyramid-shaped
- Fruit quality including i) overcoming bitter taste components caused by changes in pulp, pericarp or aril and ii) pericarp cracking resulting from excessive water uptake
- Rootstock for improved adaptation to drought and robust development in early years of growth

=== Yield ===
Mangosteen trees may reach fruit-bearing in as little as 6 years but may require 12 or more years, depending on climate and cultivation methods. The yield of the mangosteen is variable, depending on the climate and age of the tree. If the young tree is bearing for the first time, 200–300 fruits may be produced, whereas at maturity, 500 fruits per season are average. At age 30 to 45 years in full maturity, each tree may yield as many as 3,000 fruits, with trees as old as 100 years still producing.

=== Regional production ===
Major mangosteen production occurs in Southeast Asia, mainly in Thailand as the country with the most acreage planted, estimated at 4,000 ha in 1965 and 11,000 ha in 2000, giving a total yield of 46,000 tons. Mangosteen is seasonally available in Thailand from May through September. Indonesia, Malaysia and the Philippines are other major Asian producers. Mangosteen production in Colombia and Puerto Rico has been successful.

=== Diseases and pests ===
==== Common diseases and pests ====
The pathogens that attack mangosteen are common in other tropical trees. The diseases can be divided into foliar, fruit, stem and soil-borne diseases.

Pestalotiopsis leaf blight (Pestalotiopsis flagisettula, only identified in Thailand) is one of the diseases that infect especially young leaves. Furthermore, the pathogen causes the fruits to rot before and after the harvest. Additional stem canker and dieback are caused by the pathogen. Some of the symptoms of stem canker are branch splitting, gummosis and bark blistering. The main areas where the disease was observed are Thailand, Malaysia, and North Queensland.

Another common disease is the thread blight or white thread blight disease (Marasmiellus scandens) whereas the name comes from the mycelia which resembles thread. Leaves, twigs, and branches may also be damaged by the disease. The spores spread with the help of wind, raindrops, and insects, and thrive in shady, humid, and wet conditions.

An important post-harvest disease affecting mangosteen, especially in Thailand is called Diplodia fruit rot (Diplodia theobromae) which, as a secondary pathogen, enters the host plant through wounds.

Phellinus noxius living on the roots and trunk bases causes brown root disease, a name derived from the appearance of the mycelium-binding soil particles. The distribution of the fungus happens through contact with infected wood or thick rhizomorphs on tree stumps.

There are a few pests that feed on mangosteen leaves and fruits including leaf eater (Stictoptera sp.), leaf miner (Phyllocnictis citrella) and fruit borer (Curculio sp.). Especially in nurseries, the larval stage of the leaf eater can cause visible damage on young leaves, but can be managed by biological control agents. The larval stage of fruit borer (Curculio sp.) feeds on different parts of fruit before ripening.

==== Control measures for diseases and pests ====
Different management options can be applied to control mangosteen diseases.

- Measures to inhibit sun scalding to minimize leaf blight and stem canker.
- Reduction of wounds caused by insects and storm damage to minimize disease incidence.
- Change of the microclimate by tree spacing and pruning.
- Chemicals applied to root collars and tree stumps to control root diseases.
- Fungicides to control fungal pathogens.
- Biological pest control or insecticides to control insects.

== Nutritional content ==
Mangosteen, canned, syrup pack
Nutritional value per 100 g (3.5 oz)
- Energy: 305 kJ (73 kcal)
- Carbohydrates: 17.91 g
- Dietary fiber: 1.8 g
- Fat: 0.58 g
- Protein: 0.41 g
Vitamins and minerals
Vitamins	Quantity %DV^{†}
Thiamine (B1)	5% 0.054 mg
Riboflavin (B2)	4% 0.054 mg
Niacin (B3)	2% 0.286 mg
Pantothenic acid (B5)	1% 0.032 mg
Vitamin B6	1% 0.018 mg
Folate (B9)	8% 31 μg
Vitamin C	3% 2.9 mg
Minerals	Quantity %DV^{†}
Calcium	1% 12 mg
Iron	2% 0.3 mg
Magnesium	3% 13 mg
Manganese	4% 0.102 mg
Phosphorus	1% 8 mg
Potassium	2% 48 mg
Sodium	0% 7 mg
Zinc	2% 0.21 mg
- Link to USDA entry in FoodData Central
- ^{†}Percentages estimated using US recommendations for adults, except for potassium, which is estimated based on expert recommendation from the National Academies.

The endocarp – the white part of the fruit having a mild flavor – is edible, but its nutrition content is modest, as all nutrients analyzed are at a low percentage of the Daily Value, (a nutrition guide for consumers used in the US and Canada only – see table for canned fruit in syrup, USDA FoodData Central; note that nutrient values for fresh fruit are likely different, but have not been published by a reputable source).

== Uses ==
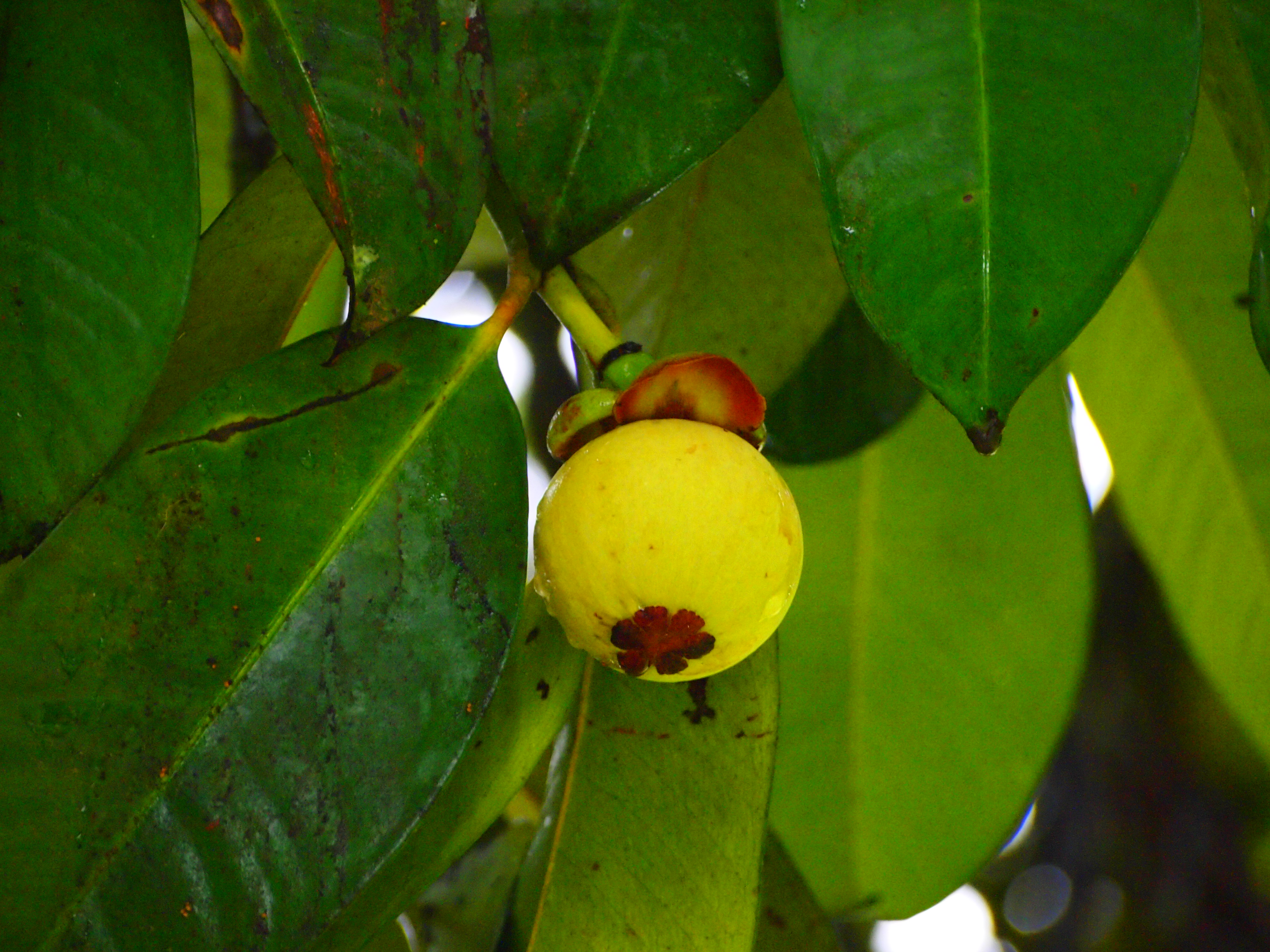
Young fruit

=== Culinary ===
Without fumigation or irradiation to kill the Asian fruit fly, fresh mangosteens were illegal to import into the United States until 2007. Following export from its natural growing regions in Southeast Asia (particularly Thailand), the fresh fruit is available seasonally in some local markets in North America such as those of Chinatowns. Mangosteens are available fresh, canned and frozen in Western countries. The fruit may be served as a dessert or made into jams. In Vietnam, the ripe fruit is also used as a salad ingredient.

Upon arrival in the US in 2007, fresh mangosteens sold at up to $130/kg ($60/lb) in specialty produce stores in New York City, but wider availability and somewhat lower prices have become common in the United States and Canada. Despite efforts described above to grow mangosteen in the Western Hemisphere, nearly the entire supply is imported from Thailand.

Before ripening, the mangosteen shell is fibrous and firm but becomes soft and easy to pry open when the fruit ripens. To open a mangosteen, the shell can be scored with a knife, pried gently along the score with the thumbs until it cracks, and then pulled apart to reveal the fruit. Alternatively, the mangosteen can be opened without a knife by squeezing the shell from the bottom until it breaks, allowing the shell to be removed and the fruit eaten while intact with the stem. In Southeast Asian countries, the mangosteen is usually served with the bottom part of the shell intact. Occasionally, during peeling of ripe fruits, the purple exocarp juice may stain skin or fabric.

=== Traditional medicine ===
Various parts of the plant have a history of use in traditional medicine, mostly in Southeast Asia; it may have been used to treat skin infections, wounds, dysentery, urinary tract infections, and gastrointestinal complaints, although there is no high-quality clinical evidence for any of these effects.

Dried fruits are shipped to Singapore to be processed for medical uses which may include dysentery, skin disorders, and various other minor diseases in several countries across Asia. There is no reliable evidence that mangosteen juice, puree, bark or extracts is effective as a treatment for human diseases.

=== In art ===
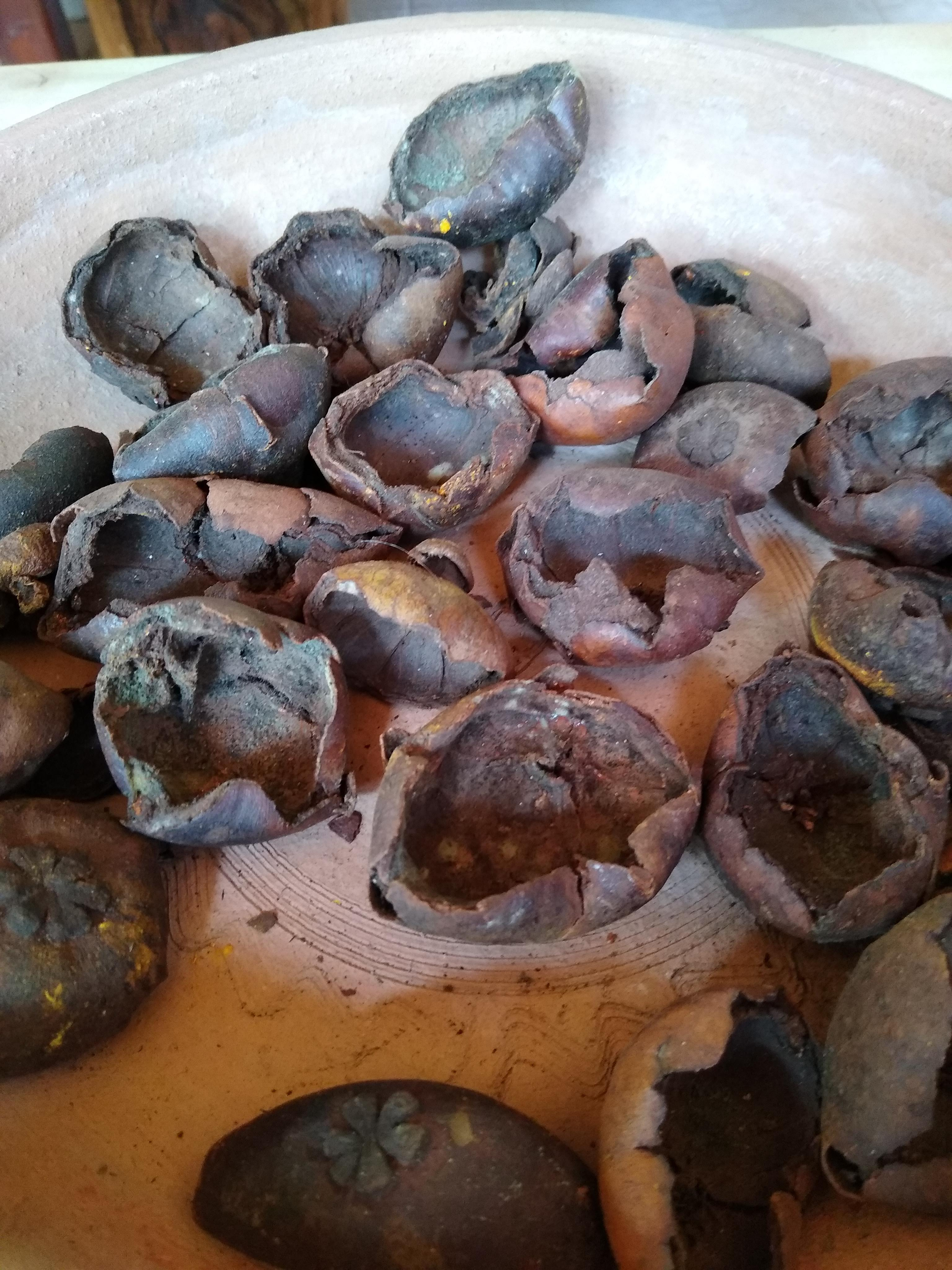
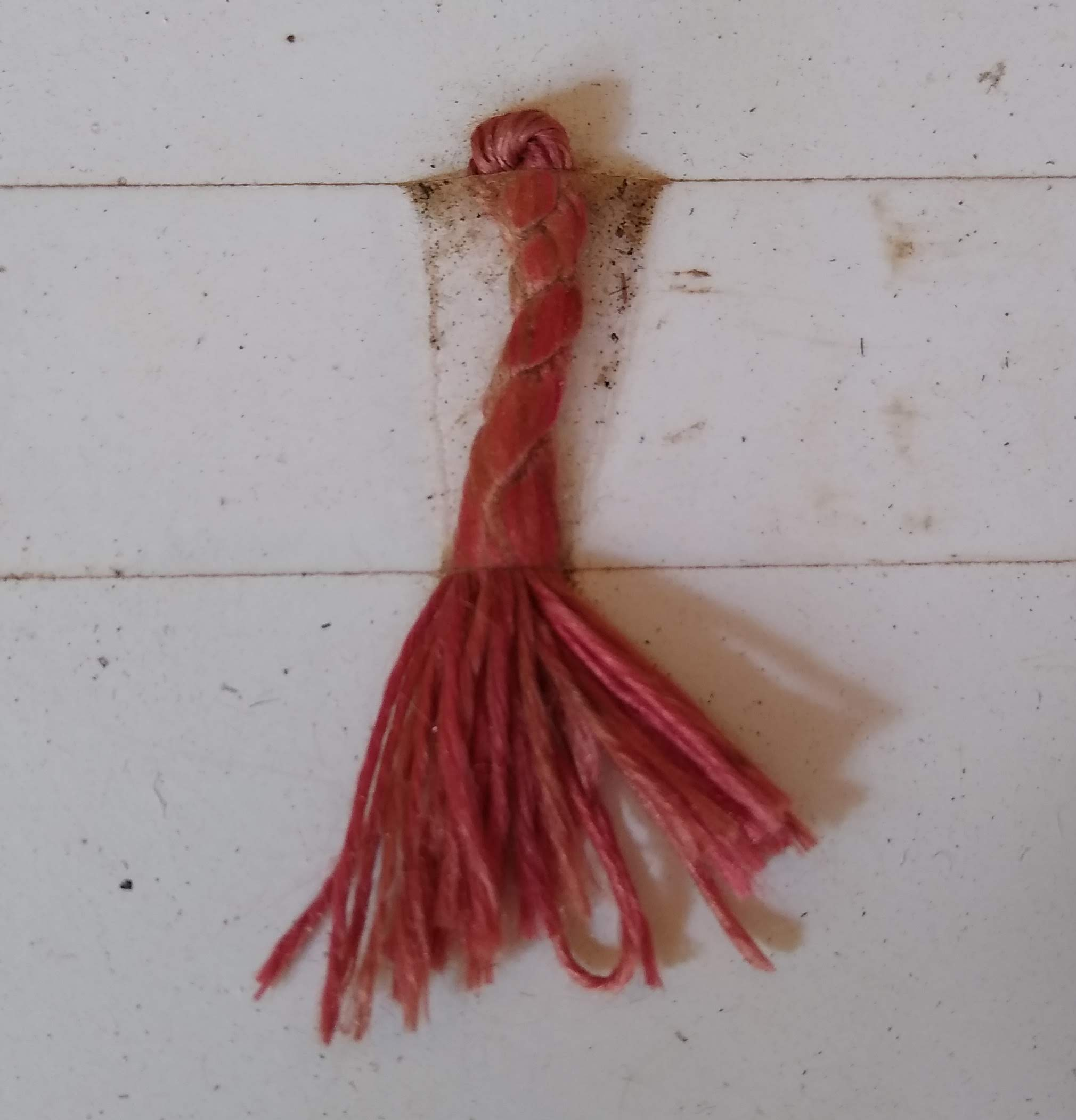
Mangosteen peels and thread dyed with mangosteen-based dye

Tampuk manggis songket motif

The extract of mangosteen peels is traditionally used in Indonesia as natural dye for coloring tenun ikat and batik textiles in brown, dark brown, purple or red hues.

The mangosteen's lobed calyx (tampuk manggis) is a common pattern in Malay fabrics like the songket, it symbolises one's pleasant character regardless of their appearance.

=== Other uses ===
Mangosteen twigs have been used as chew sticks in Ghana, and the wood has been used to make spears and cabinetry in Thailand. The rind of the mangosteen fruit has also been used to tan leather in China.

== Phytochemicals ==
Mangosteen peel contains xanthonoids, such as mangostin, and other phytochemicals. Polysaccharide and xanthone compounds are found in the fruit, leaves, and heartwood of the mangosteen. Fully ripe fruit contain the xanthones – gartanin, 8-disoxygartanin, and normangostin.

== Marketing ==
Fresh mangosteen is marketed for only a short period of six to ten weeks due to its seasonal nature. It is mainly grown by smallholders and sold at fruit stalls by roadsides. Its irregular, short supply leads to wide price fluctuations throughout its season and over the years. Additionally, there is no standard product quality assessment or grading system, making international trade of the fruit difficult. The mangosteen still remains rare in Western markets, though its popularity is increasing, and it is often sold at a high price.
