= Mangostin =

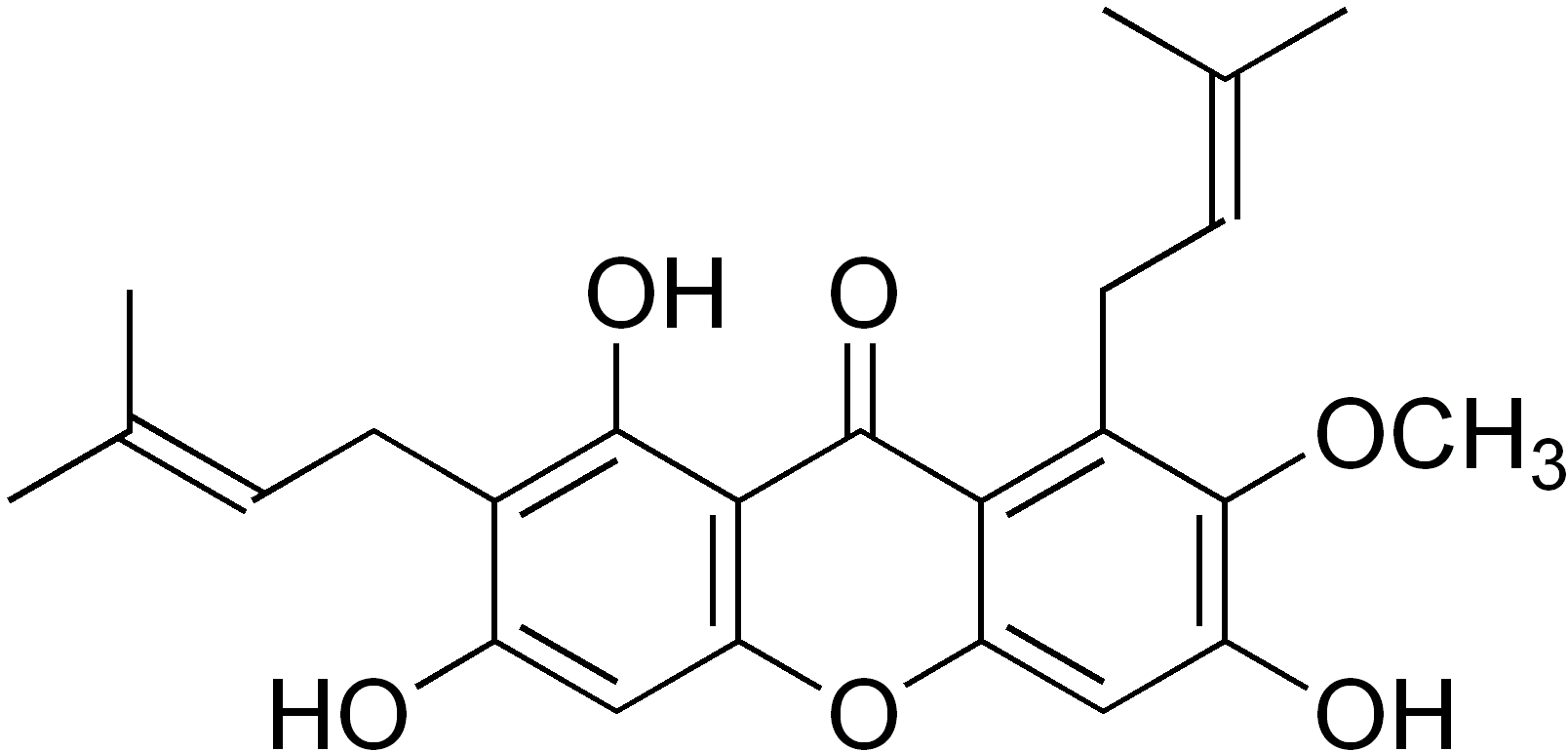

Names
- Preferred IUPAC name 1,3,6-Trihydroxy-7-methoxy-2,8-bis(3-methylbut-2-en-1-yl)-9H-xanthen-9-one
- Other names alpha-mangostin

Identifiers
CAS Number	6147-11-1
3D model (JSmol)	Interactive image
ChEBI	CHEBI:67547
ChEMBL	ChEMBL323197
ChemSpider	4444969
ECHA InfoCard	100.208.637
PubChem CID	5281650
UNII	U6RIV93RU1
CompTox Dashboard (EPA)	DTXSID00210420
- InChI: InChI=1S/C24H26O6/c1-12(2)6-8-14-16(25)10-19-21(22(14)27)23(28)20-15(9-7-13(3)4)24(29-5)17(26)11-18(20)30-19/h6-7,10-11,25-27H,8-9H2,1-5H3 Key: GNRIZKKCNOBBMO-UHFFFAOYSA-N; InChI=1/C24H26O6/c1-12(2)6-8-14-16(25)10-19-21(22(14)27)23(28)20-15(9-7-13(3)4)24(29-5)17(26)11-18(20)30-19/h6-7,10-11,25-27H,8-9H2,1-5H3 Key: GNRIZKKCNOBBMO-UHFFFAOYAL
- SMILES: CC(=CCC1=C(C=C2C(=C1O)C(=O)C3=C(C(=C(C=C3O2)O)OC)CC=C(C)C)O)C

Properties
Chemical formula	C_{24}H_{26}O_{6}
Molar mass	410.466 g·mol^{−1}
Appearance	Yellow crystalline solid
Density	1.265 g/ml
Melting point	182 °C (360 °F; 455 K)
- Except where otherwise noted, data are given for materials in their standard state (at 25 °C [77 °F], 100 kPa). verify (what is ?) Infobox references

Mangostin is a natural xanthonoid, a type of organic compound isolated from various parts of the mangosteen tree (Garcinia mangostana). It is a yellow crystalline solid with a xanthone core structure.

== Source ==
The rind of partially ripe mangosteen fruit yields mangostin and also the related compound β-mangostin. Researchers conducted optimizations to increase the yield of α-mangostin extraction from the pericarp of the mangosteen and were able to achieve 9.2 g/kg DW. The rind of fully ripe fruits also contains the xanthonoids gartanin, 8-disoxygartanin, and normangostin.

== Research ==
Mangostin and a variety of other xanthonoids from mangosteen have been investigated for biological properties including antioxidant, anti-bacterial, anti-inflammatory, and anticancer activities.

In animal studies, mangostin has been found to be a central nervous system depressant which causes sedation, decreased motor activity, and ptosis.

== Related compounds ==
A derivative of mangostin, mangostin-3,6-di-O-glucoside, is a central nervous system depressant and causes a rise in blood pressure.
