= Xanthydrol =

Organic compound derived from xanthone reduction

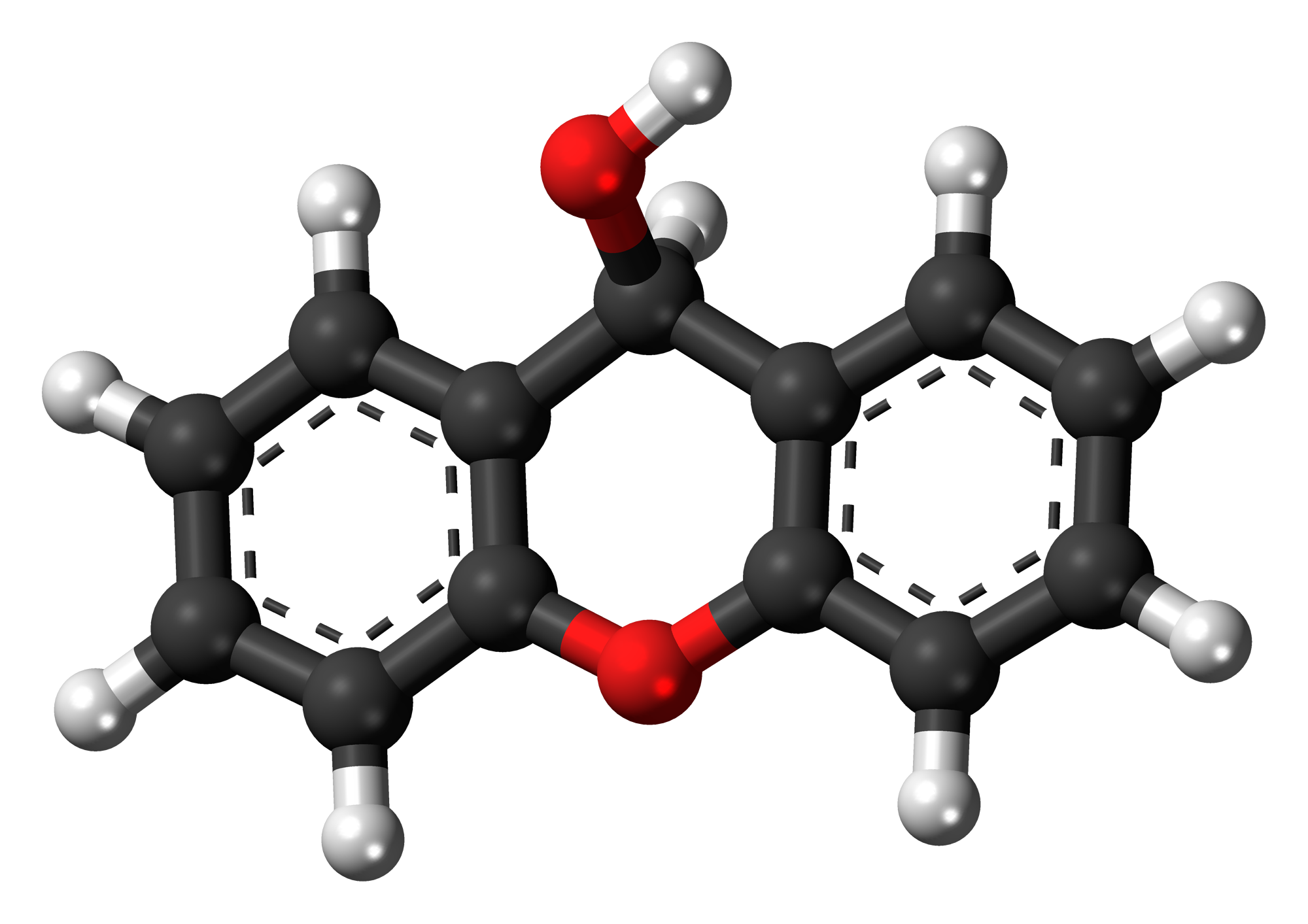

Names
- Preferred IUPAC name 9H-Xanthen-9-ol
- Other names Xanthanol, 9-Hydroxyxanthene, 9-Xanthydrol, Xanthen-9-ol, 9-Xanthenol, Xanthydrol solution

Identifiers
CAS Number	90-46-0
3D model (JSmol)	Interactive image
Beilstein Reference	10395
ChemSpider	65693
ECHA InfoCard	100.001.815
EC Number	201-996-1
PubChem CID	72861
UNII	7131M69IKF
CompTox Dashboard (EPA)	DTXSID8059009
- InChI: InChI=1S/C13H10O2/c14-13-9-5-1-3-7-11(9)15-12-8-4-2-6-10(12)13/h1-8,13-14H Key: JFRMYMMIJXLMBB-UHFFFAOYSA-N
- SMILES: O2C1=C(C=CC=C1)C(C3=C2C=CC=C3)O

Properties
Chemical formula	C_{13}H_{10}O_{2}
Molar mass	198.221 g·mol^{−1}
Melting point	124 to 126 °C (255 to 259 °F; 397 to 399 K)

Hazards
- GHS labelling
Pictograms	(GHS07: Exclamation mark) (GHS09: Environmental hazard)
Signal word	Warning
Hazard statements	H302, H315, H319, H335, H411
Precautionary statements	P261, P264, P270, P271, P273, P280, P301+P312, P302+P352, P304+P340, P305+P351+P338, P312, P321, P330, P332+P313, P337+P313, P362, P391, P403+P233, P405, P501
- Except where otherwise noted, data are given for materials in their standard state (at 25 °C [77 °F], 100 kPa). verify (what is ?) Infobox references

Xanthydrol is an organic chemical compound. Its formula is C_{13}H_{10}O_{2}. Its total molecular weight is 198.221 g/mol. Xanthydrol is used to test the levels of urea in the bloodstream. Xanthidrol/acetonitrile solution is used for the simultaneous extraction and derivatisation of ethyl carbamate.

== Synthesis ==
Xanthydrol can be produced by the reduction of xanthone.

== See also ==
- Xanthene
- Xanthone
