= Xanthene =

Chemical compound used to make dyes

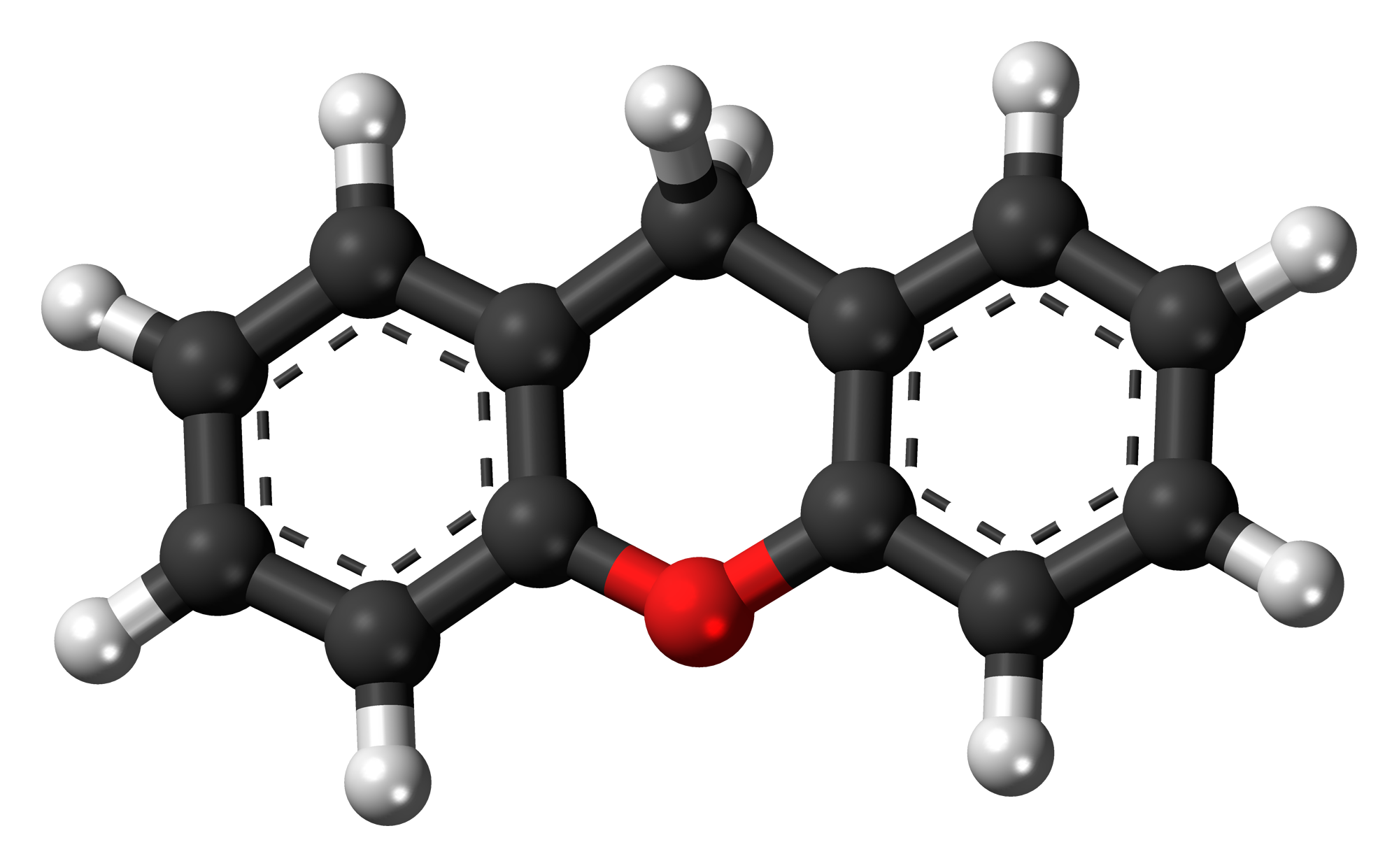

Names
- Preferred IUPAC name 9H-Xanthene
- Other names Dibenzo[a,e]pyran; 10H-9-Oxaanthracene

Identifiers
CAS Number	92-83-1
3D model (JSmol)	Interactive image
Beilstein Reference	133939
ChEBI	CHEBI:10057
ChEMBL	ChEMBL486760
ChemSpider	6840
ECHA InfoCard	100.001.996
EC Number	202-194-4
Gmelin Reference	83576
KEGG	C01464
PubChem CID	7107
UNII	A762Z8101Y
CompTox Dashboard (EPA)	DTXSID1059070
- InChI: InChI=1S/C13H10O/c1-3-7-12-10(5-1)9-11-6-2-4-8-13(11)14-12/h1-8H,9H2 Key: GJCOSYZMQJWQCA-UHFFFAOYSA-N; InChI=1/C13H10O/c1-3-7-12-10(5-1)9-11-6-2-4-8-13(11)14-12/h1-8H,9H2 Key: GJCOSYZMQJWQCA-UHFFFAOYAO
- SMILES: O1c2ccccc2Cc3ccccc31

Properties
Chemical formula	C_{13}H_{10}O
Molar mass	182.222 g·mol^{−1}
Appearance	Yellow solid
Melting point	101 to 102 °C (214 to 216 °F; 374 to 375 K)
Boiling point	310 to 312 °C (590 to 594 °F; 583 to 585 K)

Hazards
- GHS labelling
Pictograms	(GHS07: Exclamation mark)
Signal word	Warning
Hazard statements	H317
Precautionary statements	P280
- Except where otherwise noted, data are given for materials in their standard state (at 25 °C [77 °F], 100 kPa). verify (what is ?) Infobox references

Xanthene (9H-xanthene, 10H-9-oxaanthracene) is the organic compound with the formula CH_{2}[C_{6}H_{4}]_{2}O. It is a yellow solid that is soluble in common organic solvents. Xanthene itself is an obscure compound, but many of its derivatives are useful dyes.

== Xanthene dyes ==
Rhodamines are commercial dyes with xanthene cores.

Dyes that contain a xanthene core include bikaverin, fluorescein, eosins, and rhodamines. Xanthene dyes tend to be fluorescent, yellow to pink to bluish red, brilliant dyes. Many xanthene dyes can be prepared by condensation of derivates of phthalic anhydride with derivates of resorcinol or 3-aminophenol.

== See also ==
- Xanthone
- Xanthydrol
