= Xanthone =

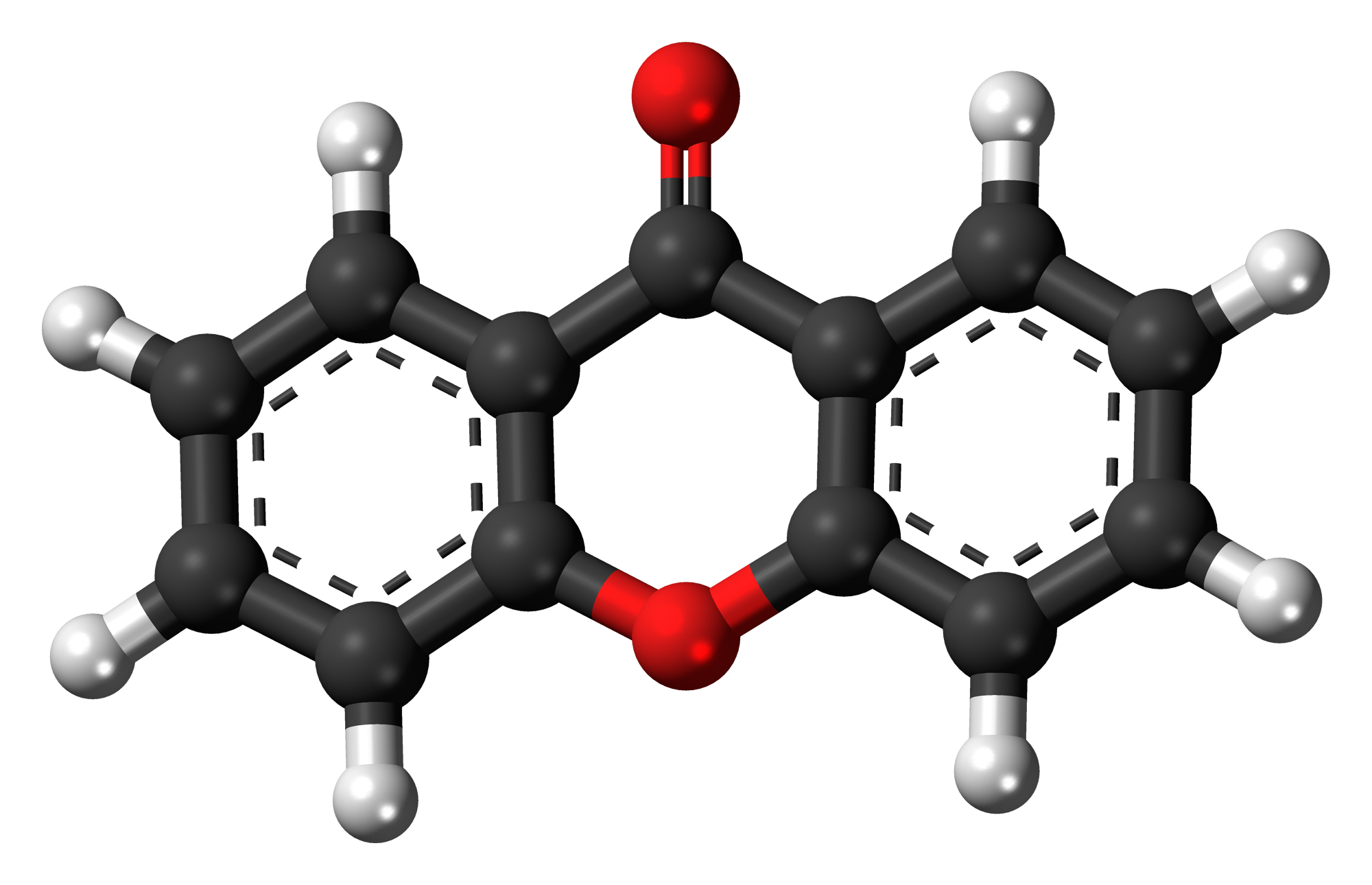

Names
- Preferred IUPAC name 9H-Xanthen-9-one
- Other names 9-Oxoxanthene; Diphenyline ketone oxide

Identifiers
CAS Number	90-47-1
3D model (JSmol)	Interactive image
Beilstein Reference	140443
ChEBI	CHEBI:37647
ChEMBL	ChEMBL186784
ChemSpider	6753
ECHA InfoCard	100.001.816
EC Number	201-997-7
Gmelin Reference	166003
PubChem CID	7020
UNII	9749WEV0CA
CompTox Dashboard (EPA)	DTXSID6021795
- InChI: InChI=1S/C13H8O2/c14-13-9-5-1-3-7-11(9)15-12-8-4-2-6-10(12)13/h1-8H Key: JNELGWHKGNBSMD-UHFFFAOYSA-N; InChI=1/C13H8O2/c14-13-9-5-1-3-7-11(9)15-12-8-4-2-6-10(12)13/h1-8H Key: JNELGWHKGNBSMD-UHFFFAOYAA
- SMILES: O=C1c2ccccc2Oc3ccccc31

Properties
Chemical formula	C_{13}H_{8}O_{2}
Molar mass	196.205 g·mol^{−1}
Appearance	white solid
Melting point	174 °C (345 °F; 447 K)
Solubility in water	Sl. sol. in hot water
Magnetic susceptibility (χ)	-108.1·10^{−6} cm^{3}/mol

Hazards
- GHS labelling
Pictograms	(GHS06: Toxic)
Signal word	Danger
Hazard statements	H301
Precautionary statements	P264, P270, P301+P310, P321, P330, P405, P501

Related compounds
Related compounds	xanthene
- Except where otherwise noted, data are given for materials in their standard state (at 25 °C [77 °F], 100 kPa). verify (what is ?) Infobox references

Xanthone is an organic compound with the molecular formula C_{13}H_{8}O_{2}. It is a white solid.

In 1939, xanthone was introduced as an insecticide and it currently finds uses as ovicide for codling moth eggs and as a larvicide. Xanthone is also used in the preparation of xanthydrol, which is used in the determination of urea levels in the blood. It can also be used as a photocatalyst.

== Synthesis ==
Xanthone can be prepared by the heating of phenyl salicylate:

Various other methods of synthesis given are:

- Heating a mixture of salicylic acid, phenol, and acetic anhydride.
- Warming o-phenoxybenzoic acid with sulfuric acid or phosphorus pentoxide.
- Distillation of o-phenoxybenzoyl chloride under vacuum.
- Heating of aspirin or o-hydroxybenzophenone.

=== Derivatives ===
Multiple methods have been reported for synthesizing xanthone derivatives:

- The Michael-Kostanecki method uses an equimolar mix of a polyphenol and a salicylic acid derivative, which are heated with a dehydrating agent in a condensation reaction.
- The Friedel-Crafts method has a benzophenone intermediate.
- The Robinson-Nishikawa method is a variant of the Hoesch synthesis but with low yields.
- The Asahina-Tanase method synthesizes some methoxylated xanthones, and xanthones with acid-sensitive substituents.
- The Tanase method is used to synthesize polyhydroxyxanthones.
- The Ullman method condenses a phenol with an O-chlorobenzene and cyclizes the resulting diphenylether.

== Xanthone derivatives ==
Xanthone forms the core of a variety of natural products, such as mangostin or lichexanthone. These compounds are sometimes referred to as xanthones or xanthonoids. Over 200 natural xanthones have been identified. Many are phytochemicals found in plants in the families Bonnetiaceae, Clusiaceae, and Podostemaceae. They are also found in some species of the genus Iris. Some xanthones are found in the pericarp of the mangosteen fruit (Garcinia mangostana) as well as in the bark and timber of Mesua thwaitesii.

== See also ==
- Tetrahydroxanthones
- Thioxanthone
- Xanthene
