= Fusaric acid =

Names
- Preferred IUPAC name 5-Butylpyridine-2-carboxylic acid
- Other names 5-Butylpicolinic acid Fusarinic acid

Identifiers
CAS Number	536-69-6
3D model (JSmol)	Interactive image
ChemSpider	3324
ECHA InfoCard	100.007.859
EC Number	208-643-0
KEGG	C10146
MeSH	D005669
PubChem CID	3442
UNII	JWJ963070N
CompTox Dashboard (EPA)	DTXSID5023085
- InChI: InChI=1S/C10H13NO2/c1-2-3-4-8-5-6-9(10(12)13)11-7-8/h5-7H,2-4H2,1H3,(H,12,13) Key: DGMPVYSXXIOGJY-UHFFFAOYSA-N; InChI=1/C10H13NO2/c1-2-3-4-8-5-6-9(10(12)13)11-7-8/h5-7H,2-4H2,1H3,(H,12,13) Key: DGMPVYSXXIOGJY-UHFFFAOYAD
- SMILES: CCCCC1=CN=C(C=C1)C(=O)O

Properties
Chemical formula	C_{10}H_{13}NO_{2}
Molar mass	179.219 g·mol^{−1}
Appearance	Crystalline powder, off-white to faint yellow
Density	1.1248 g/cm^3
Melting point	97 to 98 °C (207 to 208 °F; 370 to 371 K)
Boiling point	311.75 °C (593.15 °F; 584.90 K)
Solubility	ethanol: 50 mg/mL

Hazards
- GHS labelling
Pictograms	(GHS07: Exclamation mark)
Signal word	Warning

Related compounds
Related compounds	picolinic acid
- Except where otherwise noted, data are given for materials in their standard state (at 25 °C [77 °F], 100 kPa). verify (what is ?) Infobox references

Fusaric acid (FA), also known as 5-butylpicolinic acid, is a unique mycotoxin produced as a secondary metabolite by many Fusarium species. Other mycotoxins are usually only produced by a few Fusarium species. It is a phytotoxin that interacts with plants and microbes in a non-specific way. There is already evidence of it being toxic for animals. Other studies have focused on the pharmacological opportunities for fusaric acid. Even more research was done showing the antibacterial and antifungal opportunities. Its first discovery was in a laboratory culture of Fusarium heterosporum in 1934 by Yabuta.

== Structure ==
Fusaric acid, systematically named 5-butylpyridine-2-carboxylic acid, has the molecular formula C_{10}H_{13}NO_{2}. Its structure consists of a pyridine ring with a carboxylic acid group (COOH) at the 2-position and an n-butyl side chain at the 5-position. The carboxylic acid group acts as a proton donor, giving fusaric acid its acidic properties. In contrast, the nitrogen atom of the pyridine ring can accept a proton, contributing to its chemical reactivity. Both the nitrogen and the carboxylic acid group withdraw electron density from the aromatic ring, resulting in an electron-poor aromatic system. The n-butyl side chain increases the compound's lipophilicity, which enhances its ability to penetrate cell membranes. Additionally, fusaric acid functions as a metal-chelating agent, enabling it to bind divalent metal ions such as iron, manganese, copper, and zinc; this chelating can disrupt normal biological processes by limiting the availability of these metals.

== Synthesis ==
Numerous synthetic routes have been developed for the preparation of fusaric acid. These approaches can be broadly classified into three categories: (1) construction of the pyridine ring via Diels-Alder reactions, (2) modification of pre-formed substituted pyridine intermediates, and (3) synthesis involving modification at the C2 and C5 positions of the pyridine ring via Wittig and carbonylation reactions.

The first approach involves constructing the pyridine ring through a Diels-Alder reaction, followed by further transformations to yield fusaric acid. However, these reactions are often performed under harsh conditions or require hazardous reagents such as selenium dioxide (SeO_{2}), gaseous hydrogen chloride (HCl), potassium permanganate (KMnO_{4}), and magnesium amalgam. These substances are toxic and environmentally harmful, and these methods are unsuitable for large-scale synthesis.

The second approach uses substituted pyridine intermediates. In one route, benzyl 5-bromopicolinate is prepared from 2,5-dibromopyridine and subsequently converted to fusaric acid via Negishi coupling, catalytic hydrogenation, and recrystallisation. Another method involves preparing methyl (or ethyl) 5-bromopicolinate as a key intermediate, followed by a two-step sequence of Suzuki coupling and hydrolysis to synthesise fusaric acid. A major limitation of these methods is the low yield obtained from the coupling reactions.

The third approach avoids these limitations by introducing the butyl side chain and carboxyl group in a stepwise manner starting from a brominated pyridine derivative. The synthesis begins with a Wittig reaction between 6-bromonicotinaldehyde and n-propyltriphenyl-phosphonium bromide to form 2-bromo-5-(but-1-en-1-yl)pyridine (4). Hydrogenation of the alkene yields 2-bromo-5-butylpyridine (3). This intermediate then undergoes carbonylation to give methyl 5-butylpicolinate (2), which is finally hydrolysed using LiOH to produce fusaric acid.

=== Biosynthesis ===
The biosynthesis of fusaric acid is well studied. There is a fusaric acid biosynthesis gene cluster (FUB) found in many Fusarium species. For example, they found twelve genes in the FUB cluster of F. verticillioides (maize pathogen), F. fujikuroi (rice pathogen), and F. oxysproum (cactus pathogen). It turned out that nine of these FUB genes encode for specific enzymes, two of these FUB genes for transcription factors, and one of these FUB genes for a membrane transporter. The function of the enzyme that is encoded in the FUB genes is not known for every FUB gene. However, a biosynthetic pathway of fusaric acid was still managed to be depicted. It was observed that FUB1 encodes a polyketide synthase that converts three molecules of acetate to one molecule of triketide. Then, FUB2 to FUB9 encode proteins that are involved in the reaction of triketide together with oxaloacetate to create fusaric acid. C6 transcription factors are encoded by both FUB10 and FUB12 in the nucleus, where FUB10 acts as a positive regulator for all the other FUB genes. FUB11 encodes for a membrane transporter that can remove excess fusaric acid from the intracellular matrix. Furthermore, it was observed in F. oxysporum that elements like zinc, cobalt, and molybdenum stimulate the biosynthesis of fusaric acid. Amino acids like tryptophan and cysteine, and a combination of serine and indoleacetic acid, also enhance the biosynthesis, while indoleacetic acid on its own actually inhibits the fusaric acid synthesis.

== Biotransformation ==
There are no studies done on the administration, distribution, and metabolism of fusaric acid in humans, but the effect of fusaric acid has been studied in rats. In a study in 1976, they dosed male rats orally with radioactively fusaric acid at a dose of 20 mg/kg. Most of the radioactivity remained in the liver, kidney, and plasma for 30 minutes after administration. 92.9% of the dose was excreted through urine after 24 hours of administration. 93.1% of the dose was cleared through urine after 48 hours of administration. This study, however, does not map tissue concentrations over time for all organs.

The actual metabolism of fusaric acid into non-toxic compounds has not been studied in vivo yet, but studies have been done on the detoxification routes in silico and in vitro. They focused on the cytochrome P450 family, which are enzymes important for phase I metabolism. CYP199A4, originating from the bacterium R. palustris HaA2 ( a purple non-sulfur bacterium), was in the end identified as a biotransforming enzyme of fusaric acid in silico and in vitro. It was observed that the active site of CYP199A4 could bind to fusaric acid and oxidize it into oxidized fusaric acid metabolites. This intermediate compound has not much impact on the toxicodynamics, but it could serve as an intermediate product to start conjugations in phase II metabolism to ensure metabolic detoxification. If future studies are successful, CYP199A4 could be used as a detoxification strategy within the food production chain.

== Toxicology ==
Fusaric acid is a toxic secondary metabolite produced by Fusarium species that affects both plant and animal cells. Although the precise molecular mechanisms are not yet fully known, its toxicity interferes with signaling enzymes, mitochondrial metabolism, neurotransmitter synthesis, and stress-response pathways.

=== Reactive oxygen species in plants ===
In plants, fusaric acid increases the production of reactive oxygen species (ROS). This induces oxidative stress in the plant, which damages cellular components and contributes to cell death. ROS also interferes with antioxidant defense systems and can affect important physiological processes. These effects are a major reason why fusaric acid is phytotoxic to plants and reduces plant survival when contaminated.

=== Reactive oxygen species in animal and human cells ===
In animal and human cells, fusaric acid also induces oxidative stress. Increased ROS activates the endoplasmic reticulum stress response, which is responsible for the cell cycle arrest in phase G2/M and activation of cell death. Therefore, increased ROS leads to reduced cell proliferation and increased apoptosis.

=== Protein kinase A ===
Fusaric acid also interferes with intracellular signaling by inhibiting protein kinase A (PKA), which is an enzyme that regulates essential cellular processes through phosphorylation. Fusaric acid can bind to PKA and inhibit its activity, disrupting the signaling pathway of PKA. This disruption can affect mitochondrial organization and cell membrane structures, leading to cellular dysfunctions

=== Mitochondria ===
Fusaric acid can also disrupt mitochondria in another way because it can alter mitochondrial metabolism. This is done by increasing the transcription factor hypoxia-inducible factor-1a (HIF-1a), which regulates metabolic adaptations. Increased HIF-1a leads to an increased expression of pyruvate dehydrogenase kinase-1 (PDK-1), which inhibits pyruvate dehydrogenase (PDH). PDA is an enzyme that converts pyruvate into acetyl-CoA. As a result, the tricarboxylic acid cycle (TCA cycle) is limited, producing less fuel for oxidative phosphorylation in mitochondria. As a consequence, less ATP is made, and cells rely more on glycolysis for ATP production than on mitochondria.

=== Dopamine beta-hydroxylase ===
Another important mechanism in animals and humans that is inhibited by fusaric acid is dopamine beta-hydroxylase (DBH) [14]. DBH is a biosynthetic enzyme that catalyzes dopamine into norepinephrine [19]. When fusaric acid acts as an uncompetitive inhibitor with the substrate and as a mixed-type inhibitor when cofactors such as ascorbic acid are present [14]. When fusaric acid reduces DBH activity, norepinephrine levels decrease, which can cause neurological and cardiovascular disorders and can disrupt normal physiological regulation.

=== HepG2 cells ===
Fusaric acid also affects genomic stability by causing DNA damage in HepG2 cells, which activates cellular stress responses. Fusaric acid reduces the overall p53 protein levels. p53 is a key player in this stress response. Despite the reduction, p53 becomes more phosphorylated at Ser-15 and more acetylated at Lys-382. These modifications indicate activation of p53. Fusaric acid also decreases the expression of CBP/p300, an enzyme that normally acetylates and activates p53. Furthermore, fusaric acid increases the expression of phosphorylated Sirt1 and MDM2 levels. These changes promote p53 degradation and disrupt its stability. Together, these alterations change the balance of p53 by activation and degradation, which leads to apoptosis and inhibition of cell proliferation in HepG2 cells.

=== Antibiotic effect on microorganisms ===
Fusaric acid has an antibiotic effect on microorganisms, particularly bacteria. It is a non-specific toxin, meaning that it does not have a specific target like an enzyme or a receptor. The precise mechanism of action is not known, but research suggests that fusaric acid disrupts basic physiological processes in microbial cells because they alter the integrity of the cell membrane. This damage increases membrane permeability, causing leakage of electrolytes, leading to inhibited cellular respiration that ultimately inhibits microbial growth. These cellular effects disrupt essential processes required for cell survival, like damaging membranes and interfering with energy metabolism
