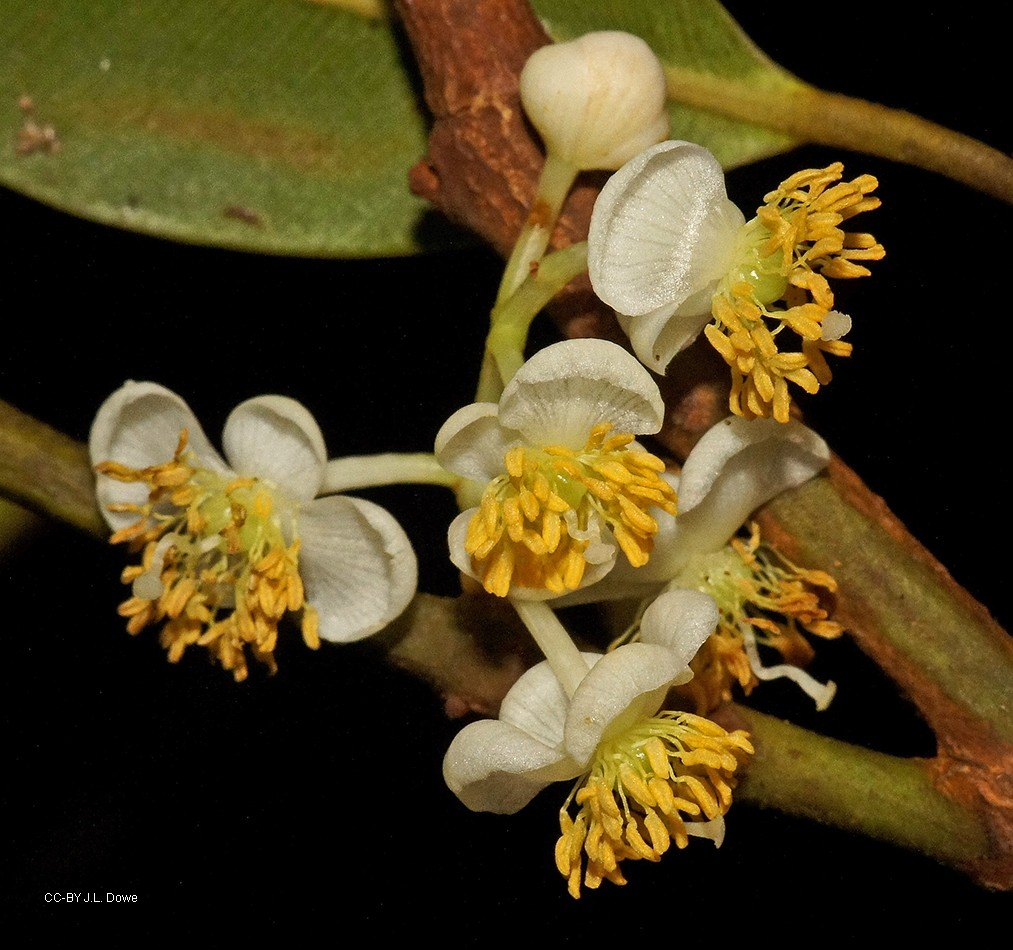
- Flowers

Conservation status
- Least Concern (NCA)

Scientific classification
- Kingdom: Plantae
- Clade: Tracheophytes
- Clade: Angiosperms
- Clade: Eudicots
- Clade: Rosids
- Order: Malpighiales
- Family: Calophyllaceae
- Genus: Calophyllum
- Species: C. australianum

Binomial name
- Calophyllum australianum F.Muell.

Synonyms
- Calophyllum calaba var. australianum (F.Muell. ex Vesque) P.F.Stevens

= Calophyllum australianum =

Species of flowering plant

Calophyllum australianum, commonly known as alligatorbark, blush touriga or pink calophyllum, is a species of plant in the family Calophyllaceae, and is endemic to Queensland, Australia. It was first described in 1889 and has a conservation status of least concern.

== Description ==
Calophyllum australianum is a tree growing to about 20–30 m (66–98 ft) tall, with bronze-yellow fissured bark. Terminal buds are up to 10 mm (0.4 in) long and reddish brown, axillary buds up to 5 mm (0.20 in) long, conspicuous. Leaves are arranged in opposite pairs, they are stiff and glossy green above, paler below, and elliptic in shape. There are numerous straight, parallel lateral veins on either side of the midrib.

The inflorescence is an unbranched and few-flowered cyme. The flowers have four (or sometimes six) white tepals and are held on a pedicel (flower stalk) about 12 mm (0.5 in) long. Stamens number between 20 and 95 and are about 4.5 mm (0.2 in) long, anthers are about 1.5 mm (0.06 in) long. There is a single style, about 2.5 mm (0.10 in) long.

The fruit is a blue or green drupe up to 16 mm (0.6 in) long and 13 mm (0.5 in) wide. It is ellipsoid to almost spherical and contains a single seed.

This species is very similar to Calophyllum sil, but can be distinguished by its longer leaves, flattened terminal buds (rounded in C. sil) and the midrib of the leaf that is at least partly raised on the upper surface of the blade (fully sunken in C. sil).

== Taxonomy ==
The first valid publication of this name was by French botanist Julien Joseph Vesque in 1889, who attributed it to German-Australian botanist Ferdinand von Mueller. It was published in his book, titled Epharmosis, sive, Materiae ad instruendam anatomiam systematis naturalis (Epharmosis, or, Materials for teaching the anatomy of the natural system).

In 1980, Peter Francis Stevens published a paper in which he reviewed the Papuasian members of the genus Calophyllum. In that review he relegated this species to a variety of Calophyllum calaba (C. calaba var. australianum). This move was not accepted by Australian authorities or by Kew Gardens, and is considered a synonym.

== Distribution and habitat ==
This species is native to eastern parts of tropical Queensland, occurring from just north of Rockhampton to the top of Cape York Peninsula. It inhabits rainforest on various soils at altitudes from near sea level to about 700 m (2,300 ft).

== Conservation ==
This species is listed as least concern under the Queensland Government's Nature Conservation Act. As of 9 June 2026, it has not been assessed by the International Union for Conservation of Nature (IUCN).

== Gallery ==
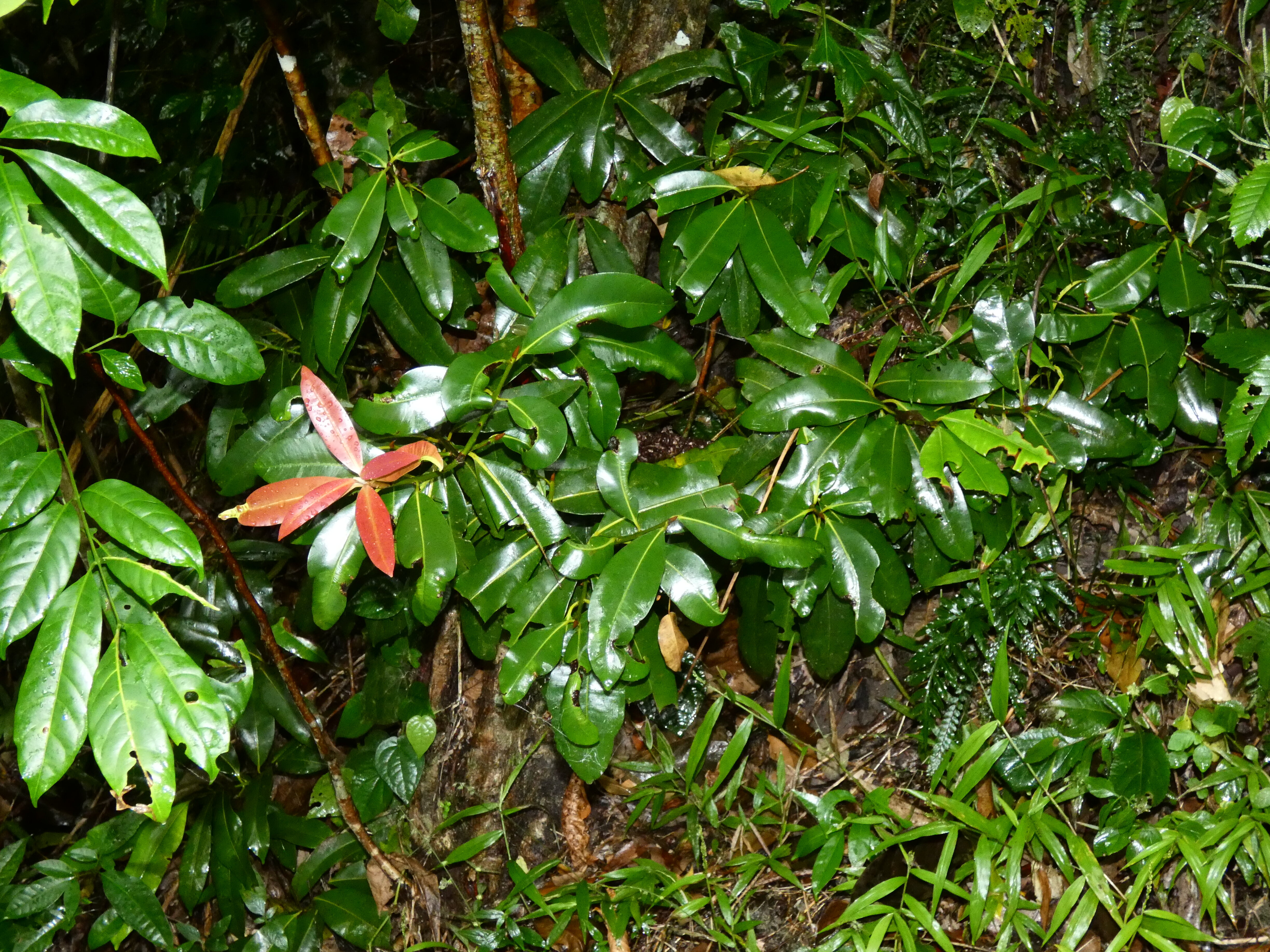
Foliage

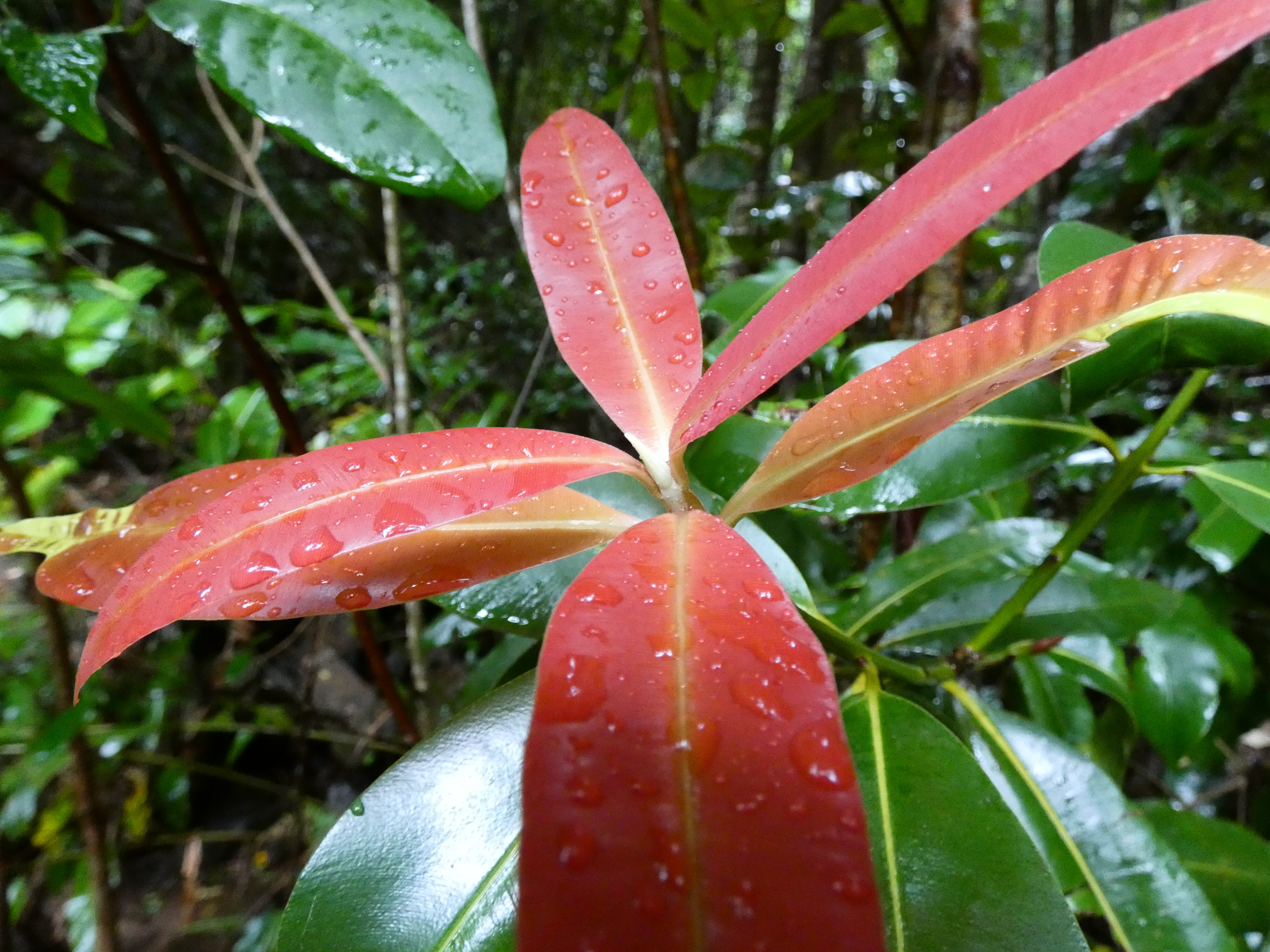
New growth

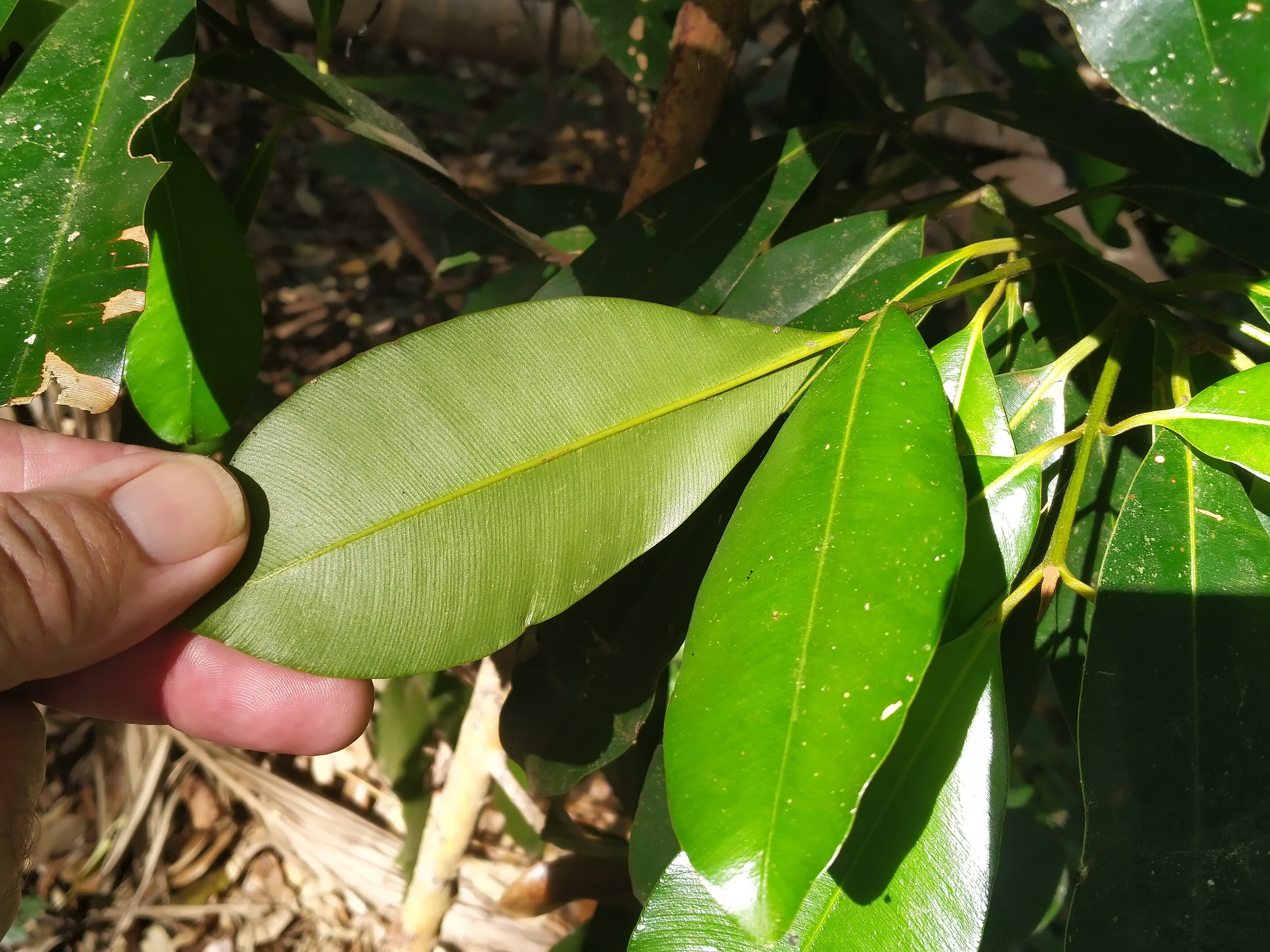
Parallel veins in leaf

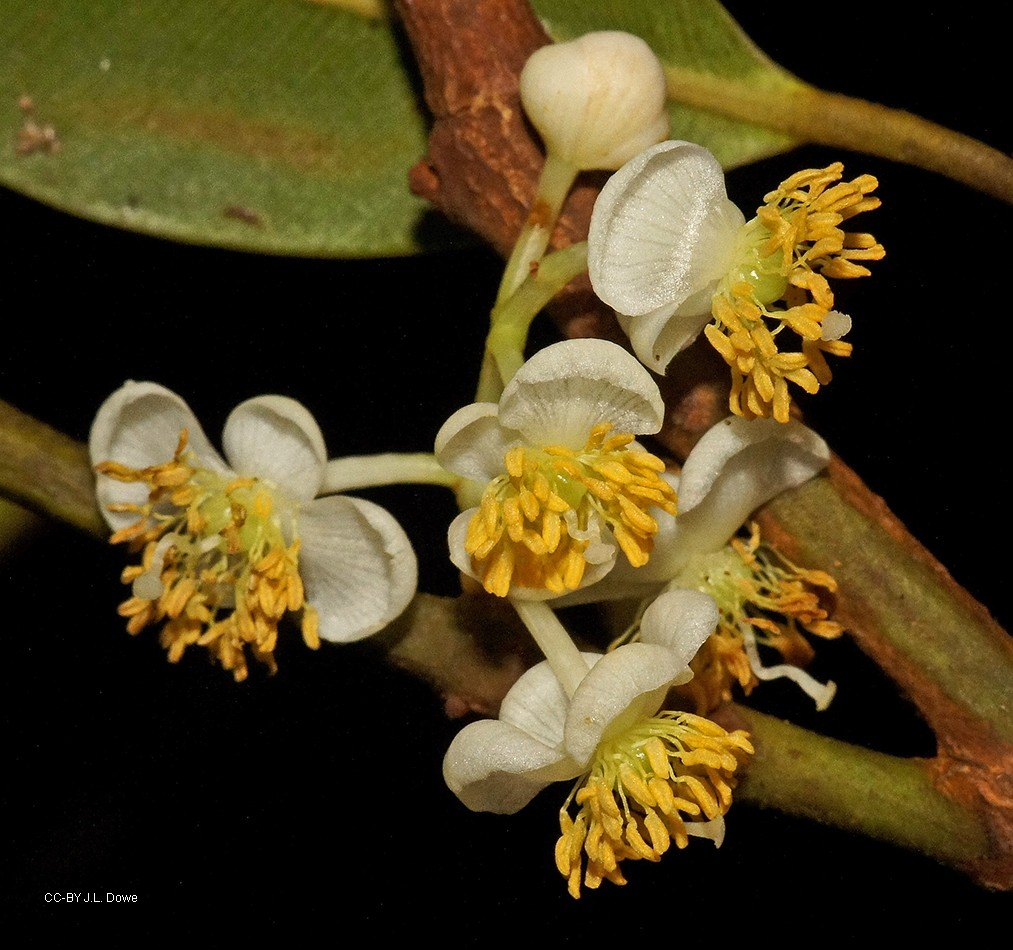
Flowers

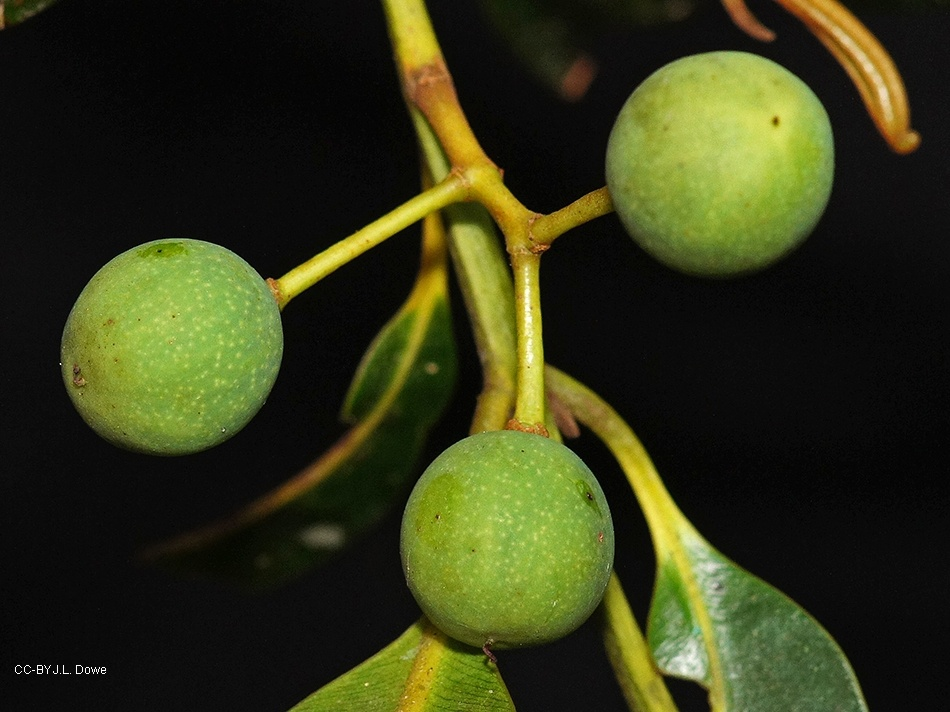
Fruit
