= C. robustum =

C. robustum may refer to:

- Calophyllum robustum, a flowering plant species found only in Papua New Guinea
- Commidendrum robustum, the Saint Helena gumwood, a tree species of the island of Saint Helena in the South Atlantic Ocean

== See also ==
- Robustum nodum
