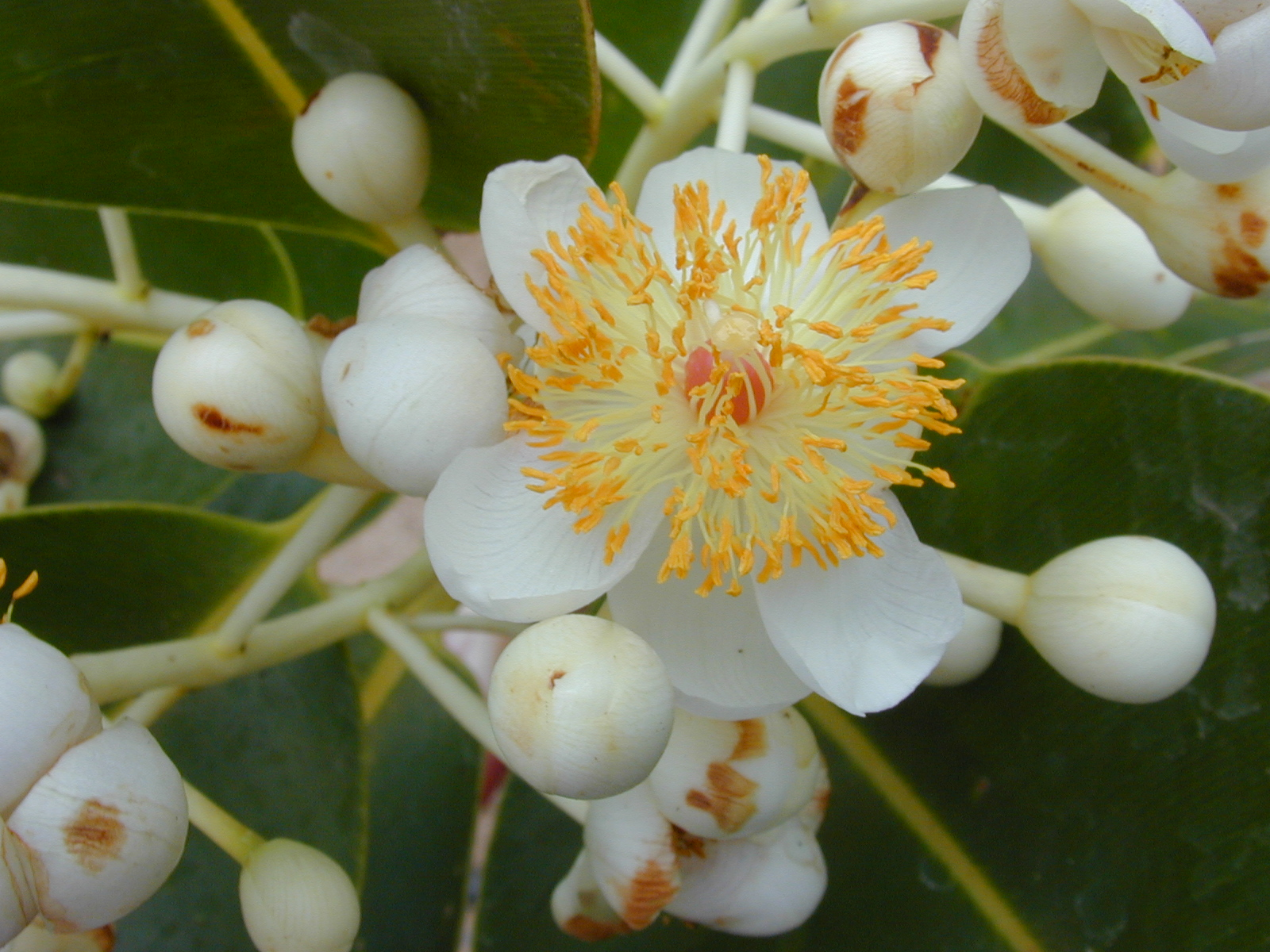
- Calophyllum inophyllum

Scientific classification
- Kingdom: Plantae
- Clade: Tracheophytes
- Clade: Angiosperms
- Clade: Eudicots
- Clade: Rosids
- Order: Malpighiales
- Family: Calophyllaceae
- Genus: Calophyllum; L.

Species
- see text

Synonyms
- Schmidelia Boehm. (Homotypic); Apoterium Blume; Balsamaria Lour.; Calaba Mill.; Ponna Boehm.

= Calophyllum =

Genus of flowering plants

Calophyllum is a genus of tropical flowering plants in the family Calophyllaceae. They are mainly distributed in Asia, with some species in Africa, the Americas, Australasia, and the Pacific Islands.

== History ==
Members of the genus Calophyllum native to Malaysia and Wallacea are of particular importance to traditional shipbuilding of the larger Austronesian outrigger ships and were carried with them in the Austronesian expansion as they migrated to Oceania and Madagascar. They were comparable in importance to how oaks were in European shipbuilding and timber industries. The most notable species is the mastwood (Calophyllum inophyllum) which grows readily in the sandy and rocky beaches of the island environments that the Austronesians colonized.

== Description ==
Calophyllum are trees or shrubs. They produce a colorless, white, or yellow latex. The oppositely arranged leaves have leathery blades often borne on petioles. The leaves are distinctive, with narrow parallel veins alternating with resin canals. The inflorescence is a cyme or a thyrse of flowers that grows from the leaf axils or at the ends of branches. In the flower the sepals and petals may look similar and are arranged in whorls. There are many stamens. The fruit is a drupe with thin layers of flesh over a large seed.

== Uses ==
Many species are used for their wood. Some are hardwood trees that can reach 30 meters in height. They tend to grow rapidly. The outer sapwood is yellowish, yellow-brown, or orange, sometimes with a pink tinge, and the inner heartwood is light reddish to red-brown. The wood has a streaked, ribboned, or zig-zag grain. The wood has been used to build boats, flooring, and furniture, and made into plywood. Calophyllum wood may be sold under the name bitangor, and the species may be used interchangeably; one shipment may contain boards from several different species.

The timber provides very high chatoyance, with an average value above 24 PZC.

Plants of the genus are also known for their chemistry, with a variety of secondary metabolites isolated, such as coumarins, xanthones, flavonoids, and triterpenes. Compounds from the genus have been reported to have cytotoxic, anti-HIV, antisecretory, cytoprotective, antinociceptive, molluscicidal, and antimicrobial properties. Some plants are used in folk medicine to treat conditions such as peptic ulcers, tumors, infections, pain, and inflammation.

C. inophyllum is the source of tamanu oil, a greenish, nutty-scented oil of commercial value. It has been used as massage oil, topical medicine, lamp oil, and waterproofing, and is still used in cosmetics. Tacamahac is the resin of the tree. This species is also cultivated for its wood and planted in coastal landscaping as a windbreak and for erosion control.

== Symbolism ==
A stylized Calophyllum is featured on the national coat of arms of Nauru.

== Species ==
As of August 2025, Plants of the World Online accepts the following 204 species:

- Calophyllum acidus Kosterm.
- Calophyllum acutiputamen P.F.Stevens
- Calophyllum aerarium P.F.Stevens
- Calophyllum africanum Cheek & Q.Luke
- Calophyllum alboramulum P.F.Stevens
- Calophyllum amblyphyllum A.C.Sm. & S.P.Darwin
- Calophyllum andersonii P.F.Stevens
- Calophyllum angulare A.C.Sm.
- Calophyllum apetalum Willd.
- Calophyllum archipelagi P.F.Stevens
- Calophyllum ardens P.F.Stevens
- Calophyllum articulatum P.F.Stevens
- Calophyllum ashtonii Fatimah & Latiff
- Calophyllum aurantiacum P.F.Stevens
- Calophyllum aureobrunnescens M.R.Hend. & Wyatt-Sm.
- Calophyllum aureum M.R.Hend. & Wyatt-Sm.
- Calophyllum australianum F.Muell. ex Vesque
- Calophyllum austroindicum Kosterm. ex P.F.Stevens
- Calophyllum balansae Pit.
- Calophyllum banyengii P.F.Stevens
- Calophyllum barioense Fatimah & Latiff
- Calophyllum beaufortensis Fatimah & Latiff
- Calophyllum bicolor P.F.Stevens
- Calophyllum biflorum M.R.Hend. & Wyatt-Sm.
- Calophyllum bifurcatum P.F.Stevens
- Calophyllum blancoi Planch. & Triana
- Calophyllum brachyphyllum Merr.
- Calophyllum bracteatum Thwaites
- Calophyllum brasiliense Cambess.
- Calophyllum brassii A.C.Sm.
- Calophyllum calaba L.
- Calophyllum calcicola P.F.Stevens
- Calophyllum caledonicum Vieill. ex Planch. & Triana
- Calophyllum canoides Fatimah & Latiff
- Calophyllum canum Hook.f. ex T.Anderson
- Calophyllum capsicoides Fatimah & Latiff
- Calophyllum carrii P.F.Stevens
- Calophyllum castaneum P.F.Stevens
- Calophyllum caudatum Kaneh. & Hatus.
- Calophyllum celebicum P.F.Stevens
- Calophyllum cerasiferum Vesque
- Calophyllum ceriferum Gagnep. ex P.F.Stevens
- Calophyllum chapelieri Drake
- Calophyllum clemensiorum P.F.Stevens
- Calophyllum collinum P.F.Stevens
- Calophyllum comorense H.Perrier
- Calophyllum complanatum P.F.Stevens
- Calophyllum confertum P.F.Stevens
- Calophyllum confusum P.F.Stevens
- Calophyllum cordato-oblongum Thwaites
- Calophyllum coriaceum M.R.Hend. & Wyatt-Sm.
- Calophyllum cornutum Fatimah & Latiff
- Calophyllum costatum F.M.Bailey
- Calophyllum costulatum M.R.Hend. & Wyatt-Sm.
- Calophyllum cucullatum Merr.
- Calophyllum cuneifolium Thwaites
- Calophyllum dasypodium Miq.
- Calophyllum depressinervosum M.R.Hend. & Wyatt-Sm.
- Calophyllum dioscurii P.F.Stevens
- Calophyllum dispar P.F.Stevens
- Calophyllum dongnaiense Pierre
- Calophyllum drouhardii H.Perrier
- Calophyllum dryobalanoides Pierre
- Calophyllum echinatum P.F.Stevens
- Calophyllum elegans Ridl.
- Calophyllum enervosum M.R.Hend. & Wyatt-Sm.
- Calophyllum eputamen P.F.Stevens
- Calophyllum euryphyllum Lauterb.
- Calophyllum exiticostatum P.F.Stevens
- Calophyllum ferrugineum Ridl.
- Calophyllum fibrosum P.F.Stevens
- Calophyllum flavoramulum M.R.Hend. & Wyatt-Sm.
- Calophyllum fraseri M.R.Hend. & Wyatt-Sm.
- Calophyllum garcinioides P.F.Stevens
- Calophyllum gemmatum Fatimah & Latiff
- Calophyllum glaucescens Ridl.
- Calophyllum goniocarpum P.F.Stevens
- Calophyllum gracilipes Merr.
- Calophyllum gracillimum M.R.Hend. & Wyatt-Sm.
- Calophyllum grandiflorum J.J.Sm.
- Calophyllum griseum P.F.Stevens
- Calophyllum havilandii P.F.Stevens
- Calophyllum heterophyllum P.F.Stevens
- Calophyllum hirasimum P.F.Stevens
- Calophyllum honbaense V.S.Dang, H.Toyama & Tagane
- Calophyllum hosei Ridl.
- Calophyllum humbertii P.F.Stevens
- Calophyllum iliasii Fatimah & Latiff
- Calophyllum incumbens P.F.Stevens
- Calophyllum inophyllum L.
- Calophyllum insularum P.F.Stevens
- Calophyllum kinabaluensis Fatimah & Latiff
- Calophyllum lanigerum Miq.
- Calophyllum lankaensis Kosterm.
- Calophyllum laticostatum P.F.Stevens
- Calophyllum latiffii Fatimah
- Calophyllum laxiflorum Drake
- Calophyllum leleanii P.F.Stevens
- Calophyllum leptocladum A.C.Sm. & S.P.Darwin
- Calophyllum leucocarpum A.C.Sm.
- Calophyllum lineare Kosterm.
- Calophyllum lingulatum P.F.Stevens
- Calophyllum lonchophyllum O.Schwarz
- Calophyllum longifolium Willd.
- Calophyllum lowei Planch. & Triana
- Calophyllum macrocarpoides Fatimah & Latiff
- Calophyllum macrocarpum Hook.f.
- Calophyllum macrophyllum Scheff.
- Calophyllum membranaceum Gardner & Champ.
- Calophyllum mesoamericanum Vela Díaz
- Calophyllum milvum P.F.Stevens
- Calophyllum molle King
- Calophyllum moonii Wight
- Calophyllum morobensis P.F.Stevens
- Calophyllum mukunense P.F.Stevens
- Calophyllum multitudinis P.F.Stevens
- Calophyllum neoebudicum Guillaumin
- Calophyllum nodosum Vesque
- Calophyllum novoguineense Kaneh. & Hatus.
- Calophyllum nubicola D'Arcy & R.C.Keating
- Calophyllum obliquinervium Merr.
- Calophyllum obscurum P.F.Stevens
- Calophyllum oliganthum Merr.
- Calophyllum pachyphyllum Planch. & Triana
- Calophyllum paniculatum P.F.Stevens
- Calophyllum papuanum Lauterb.
- Calophyllum parkeri C.E.C.Fisch.
- Calophyllum parviflorum Bojer ex Baker
- Calophyllum parvifolium Choisy
- Calophyllum pascalianum B.R.Ramesh, Ayyappan & De Franceschi
- Calophyllum pauciflorum A.C.Sm.
- Calophyllum peekelii Lauterb.
- Calophyllum pelewense P.F.Stevens
- Calophyllum pentapetalum (Blanco) Merr.
- Calophyllum persimile P.F.Stevens
- Calophyllum pervillei Drake
- Calophyllum piluliferum P.F.Stevens
- Calophyllum pinetorum Bisse
- Calophyllum pisiferum Planch. & Triana
- Calophyllum poilanei Gagnep. ex P.F.Stevens
- Calophyllum polyanthum Wall. ex Choisy
- Calophyllum praetermissum P.F.Stevens
- Calophyllum pubescens Vela Díaz
- Calophyllum pulcherrimoides Fatimah & Latiff
- Calophyllum pulcherrimum Wall. ex Choisy
- Calophyllum pyriforme P.F.Stevens
- Calophyllum recedens Jum. & H.Perrier
- Calophyllum recurvatum P.F.Stevens
- Calophyllum recurvum Fatimah & Latiff
- Calophyllum rigidulum P.F.Stevens
- Calophyllum rigidum Miq.
- Calophyllum rivulare Bisse
- Calophyllum robustum P.F.Stevens
- Calophyllum roseocostatum P.F.Stevens
- Calophyllum rotundifolium Ridl.
- Calophyllum rubiginosum M.R.Hend. & Wyatt-Sm.
- Calophyllum rufigemmatum Hend. & Wyatt-Sm. ex P.F.Stevens
- Calophyllum rufinerve Kaneh. & Hatus.
- Calophyllum rugosum P.F.Stevens
- Calophyllum rupicola Ridl.
- Calophyllum sakarium P.F.Stevens
- Calophyllum savannarum A.C.Sm.
- Calophyllum sclerophyllum Vesque
- Calophyllum scriblitifolium M.R.Hend. & Wyatt-Sm.
- Calophyllum sibatii Fatimah & Latiff
- Calophyllum sil Lauterb.
- Calophyllum soepadmoi Fatimah & Latiff
- Calophyllum soulattri Burm.f.
- Calophyllum stenophyllum Fatimah & Latiff
- Calophyllum stevensii Fatimah & Latiff
- Calophyllum stipitatum P.F.Stevens
- Calophyllum streimannii P.F.Stevens
- Calophyllum suberosum P.F.Stevens
- Calophyllum subhorizontale M.R.Hend. & Wyatt-Sm.
- Calophyllum subsessile King
- Calophyllum sundaicum P.F.Stevens
- Calophyllum symingtonianum M.R.Hend. & Wyatt-Sm.
- Calophyllum tacamahaca Willd.
- Calophyllum terminaliflorum Fatimah & Latiff
- Calophyllum tetrapterum Miq.
- Calophyllum teysmannii Miq.
- Calophyllum thorelii Pierre
- Calophyllum thuriferum Poepp.
- Calophyllum thwaitesii Planch. & Triana
- Calophyllum tomentosum Wight
- Calophyllum tonsuonensis Fatimah & Latiff
- Calophyllum touranense Gagnep. ex P.F.Stevens
- Calophyllum tournanense Gagnep. ex P.F.Stevens
- Calophyllum trachycaule Lauterb.
- Calophyllum trapezifolium Thwaites
- Calophyllum undulatum P.F.Stevens
- Calophyllum utile Bisse
- Calophyllum vanoverberghii Merr.
- Calophyllum venulosum Zoll.
- Calophyllum vergens P.F.Stevens
- Calophyllum vernicosum P.F.Stevens
- Calophyllum verticillatum P.F.Stevens
- Calophyllum vexans P.F.Stevens
- Calophyllum vitiense Turrill
- Calophyllum waliense P.F.Stevens
- Calophyllum walkeri Wight
- Calophyllum wallichianum Planch. & Triana
- Calophyllum whitfordii Merr.
- Calophyllum woodii P.F.Stevens

== Gallery ==
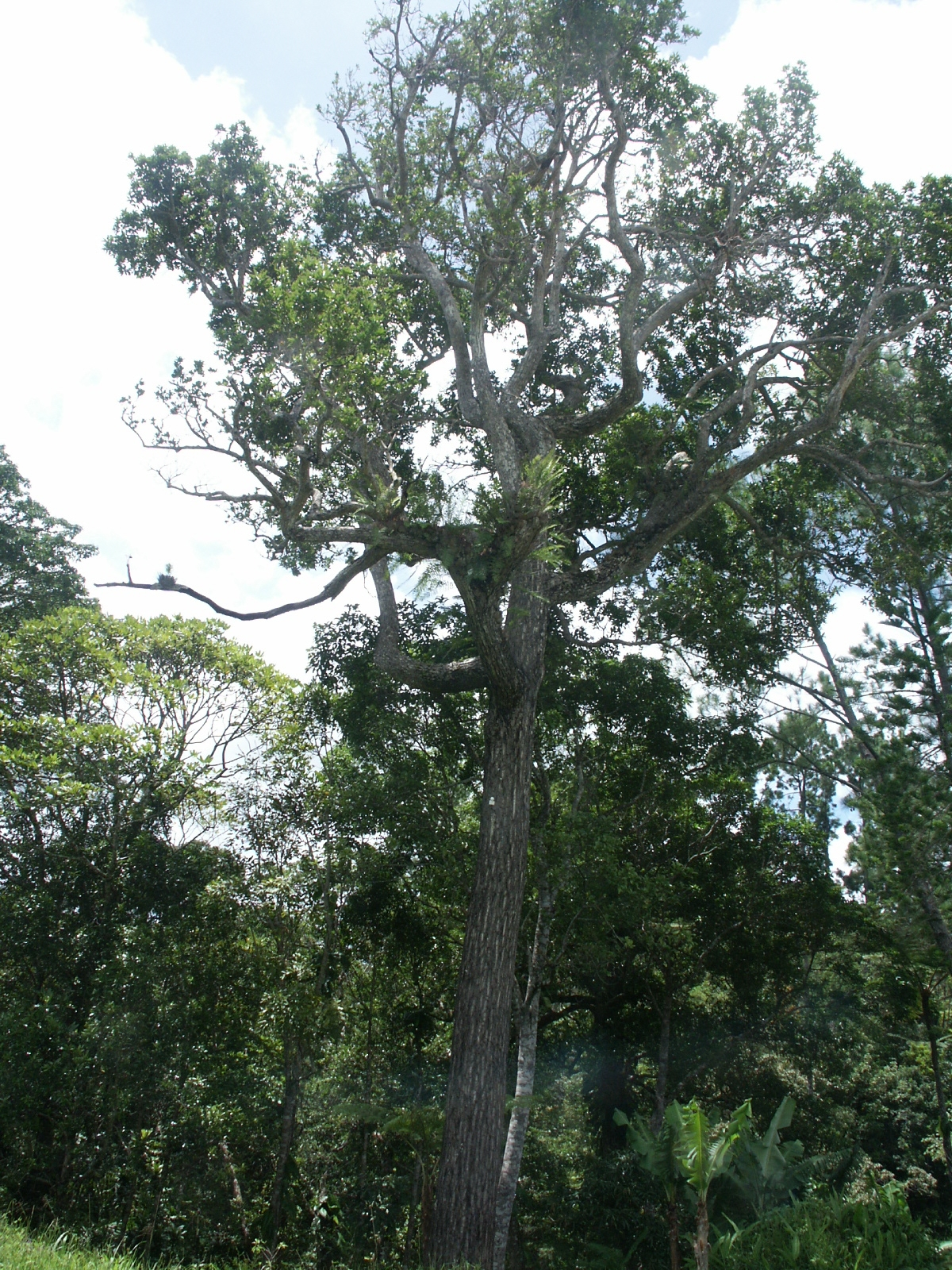
Calophyllum caledonicum

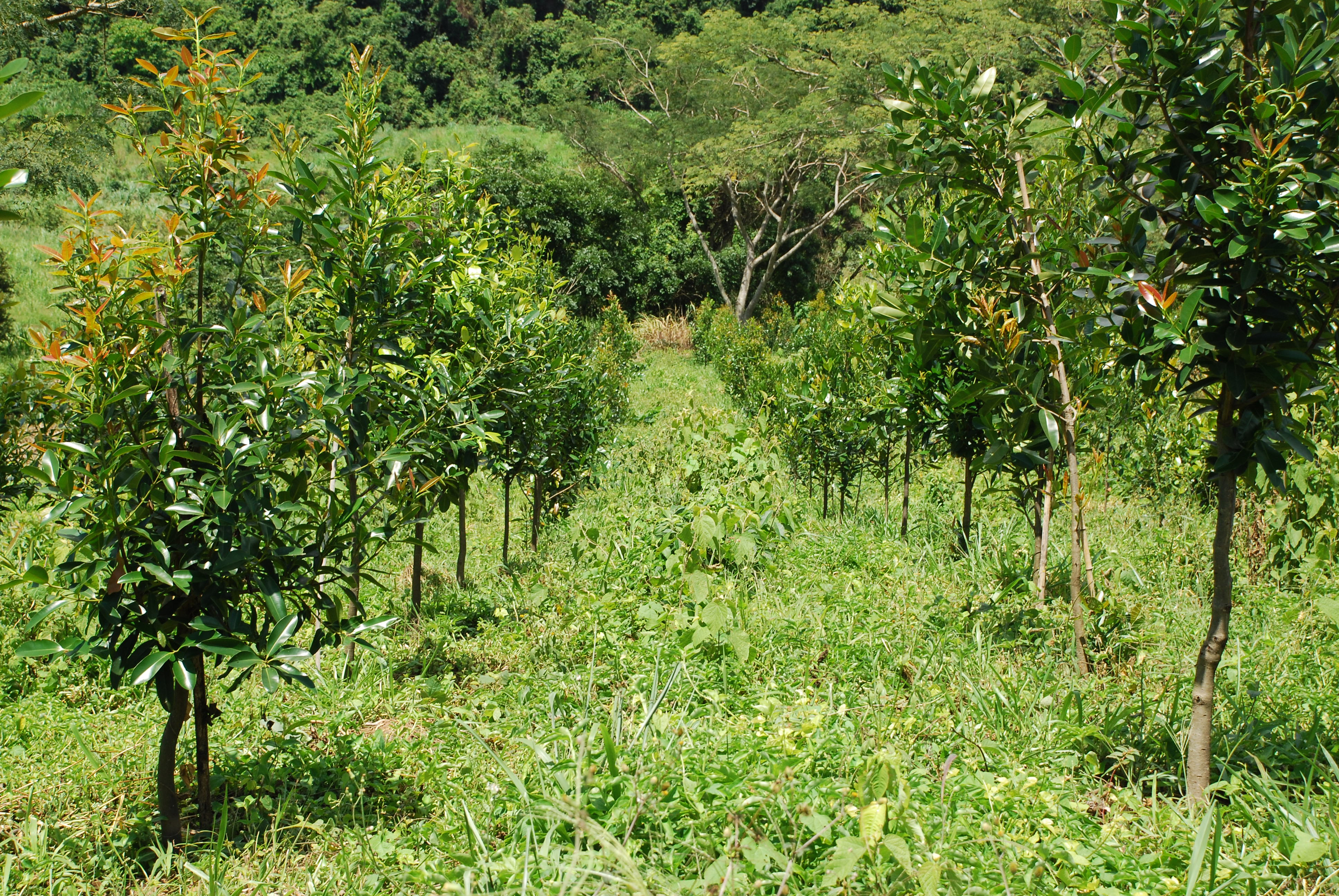
Calophyllum brasiliense plantation

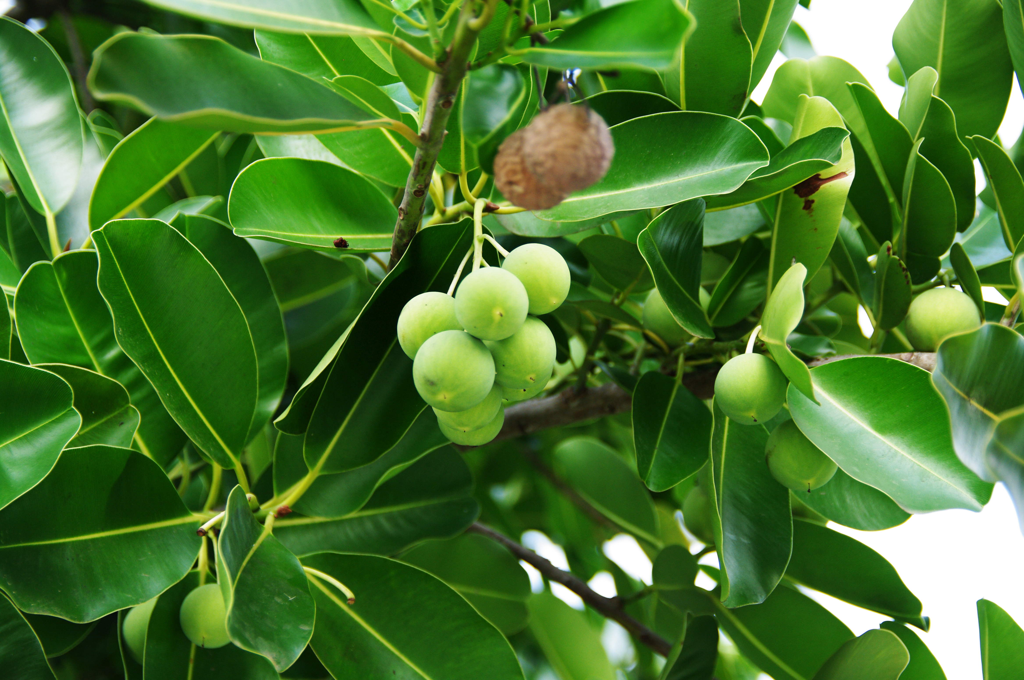
Calophyllum antillanum

== See also ==
- Domesticated plants and animals of Austronesia

== Bibliography ==
- Blume, Carl Ludwig von (1825). Bijdragen tot de Flora van Nederlandsch Indie (in Latin and Dutch). Vol. 5. Batavia: Ter Lands Drukkerij. p. 218.
- Loureiro, João de (1790). Flora cochinchinensis: sistens plantas in regno Cochinchina nascentes. Quibus accedunt aliæ observatæ in Sinensi imperio, Africa Orientali, Indiæque locis variis. Omnes dispositæ secundum systema sexuale Linnæanum. Ulyssipone (in Latin). Vol. 2. Berolini: Impennsis Haude et Spener. p. 468.
- Ludwig, Christian Gottlieb; Böhmer, Georg Rudolf (1760). D. Christiani Gottlieb Ludwig ... Definitiones generum plantarum : olim in usum auditorum collectas nunc auctas et emendata (in Latin) (2 ed.). Lipsiae: Ex Officina I.F. Gleditschii. pp. 239, 371.
- Miller, Philip (1754). The gardeners dictionary : containing the methods of cultivating and improving all sorts of trees, plants, and flowers, for the kitchen, fruit, and pleasure gardens, as also those which are used in medicine : with directions for the culture of vineyards, and making of wine in England... Vol. v.1 (4 ed.). London: Printed for the author and sold by John and James Rivington.
