= Calophyllum cuneifolium =

Conservation status
- Critically Endangered (IUCN 2.3)

Scientific classification
- Kingdom: Plantae
- Clade: Tracheophytes
- Clade: Angiosperms
- Clade: Eudicots
- Clade: Rosids
- Order: Malpighiales
- Family: Calophyllaceae
- Genus: Calophyllum
- Species: C. cuneifolium

Binomial name
- Calophyllum cuneifolium Thwaites

Species of flowering plant

Calophyllum cuneifolium is a species of flowering plant in the Calophyllaceae family. It is found only in Sri Lanka.
