= Calophyllum macrophyllum =

Conservation status
- Critically Endangered (IUCN 3.1)

Scientific classification
- Kingdom: Plantae
- Clade: Tracheophytes
- Clade: Angiosperms
- Clade: Eudicots
- Clade: Rosids
- Order: Malpighiales
- Family: Calophyllaceae
- Genus: Calophyllum
- Species: C. macrophyllum

Binomial name
- Calophyllum macrophyllum Scheff.

Species of flowering plant

Calophyllum macrophyllum is a species of flowering plant in the Calophyllaceae family. It is a tree found only in Gebeh Island in the Maluku Islands of Indonesia.
