= Calophyllum brassii =

Conservation status
- Least Concern (IUCN 3.1)

Scientific classification
- Kingdom: Plantae
- Clade: Tracheophytes
- Clade: Angiosperms
- Clade: Eudicots
- Clade: Rosids
- Order: Malpighiales
- Family: Calophyllaceae
- Genus: Calophyllum
- Species: C. brassii

Binomial name
- Calophyllum brassii A.C.Sm.

Species of flowering plant

Calophyllum brassii is a species of flowering plant in the Calophyllaceae family. It is a tree endemic to New Guinea, which is native to both Western New Guinea (Indonesia) and eastern New Guinea (Papua New Guinea).

The species was described by Albert Charles Smith in 1941.
