= Calophyllum pentapetalum =

Conservation status
- Near Threatened (IUCN 3.1)

Scientific classification
- Kingdom: Plantae
- Clade: Embryophytes
- Clade: Tracheophytes
- Clade: Angiosperms
- Clade: Eudicots
- Clade: Rosids
- Order: Malpighiales
- Family: Calophyllaceae
- Genus: Calophyllum
- Species: C. pentapetalum

Binomial name
- Calophyllum pentapetalum (Blanco) Merr.

Varieties
- Calophyllum pentapetalum var. cumingii (Planch. & Triana) P.F.Stevens; Calophyllum pentapetalum var. pentapetalum; Calophyllum pentapetalum var. pulgarense (Elmer) P.F.Stevens

Synonyms
- Ochrocarpos pentapetalus (Blanco) Fern.-Vill.; Tovomita pentapetala Blanco

Species of flowering plant

Calophyllum pentapetalum is a species of flowering plant in the family Calophyllaceae. It is a tree native to Palawan and western Luzon in the Philippines. It grows in lowland and montane rain forests, often on ultramafic soils.

Three varieties are accepted.

- Calophyllum pentapetalum var. cumingii (Planch. & Triana) P.F.Stevens
- Calophyllum pentapetalum var. pentapetalum
- Calophyllum pentapetalum var. pulgarense (Elmer) P.F.Stevens
