= Calophyllum bifurcatum =

Conservation status
- Critically Endangered (IUCN 3.1)

Scientific classification
- Kingdom: Plantae
- Clade: Tracheophytes
- Clade: Angiosperms
- Clade: Eudicots
- Clade: Rosids
- Order: Malpighiales
- Family: Calophyllaceae
- Genus: Calophyllum
- Species: C. bifurcatum

Binomial name
- Calophyllum bifurcatum P.F.Stevens

Species of flowering plant

Calophyllum bifurcatum is a species of flowering plant in the Calophyllaceae family. It is a tree found only on Yapen Island in Western New Guinea region of Indonesia.

The species was described by Peter F. Stevens in 1980.
