= Calophyllum havilandii =

Conservation status
- Vulnerable (IUCN 2.3)

Scientific classification
- Kingdom: Plantae
- Clade: Tracheophytes
- Clade: Angiosperms
- Clade: Eudicots
- Clade: Rosids
- Order: Malpighiales
- Family: Calophyllaceae
- Genus: Calophyllum
- Species: C. havilandii

Binomial name
- Calophyllum havilandii P.F.Stevens

Species of flowering plant

Calophyllum havilandii is a species of flowering plant in the Calophyllaceae family. It is endemic to Borneo, where it grows in peat swamps.
