= Calophyllum caudatum =

Conservation status
- Vulnerable (IUCN 3.1)

Scientific classification
- Kingdom: Plantae
- Clade: Tracheophytes
- Clade: Angiosperms
- Clade: Eudicots
- Clade: Rosids
- Order: Malpighiales
- Family: Calophyllaceae
- Genus: Calophyllum
- Species: C. caudatum

Binomial name
- Calophyllum caudatum Kaneh. & Hatus.

Species of flowering plant

Calophyllum caudatum is a species of flowering plant in the Calophyllaceae family. It is a tree endemic to New Guinea, where it grows in lowland tropical rain forest from 80 to 400 metres elevation.
