= Calophyllum euryphyllum =

Conservation status
- Least Concern (IUCN 3.1)

Scientific classification
- Kingdom: Plantae
- Clade: Tracheophytes
- Clade: Angiosperms
- Clade: Eudicots
- Clade: Rosids
- Order: Malpighiales
- Family: Calophyllaceae
- Genus: Calophyllum
- Species: C. euryphyllum

Binomial name
- Calophyllum euryphyllum Lauterb.

Species of tree

Calophyllum euryphyllum is a species of flowering plant in the Calophyllaceae family. It is a tree native to northern New Guinea and the Bismarck Archipelago. It is a large tree which grows 12 to 30 metres tall in primary lowland rain forest up to 610 metres elevation.

The species was described by Carl Adolf Georg Lauterbach in 1922.
