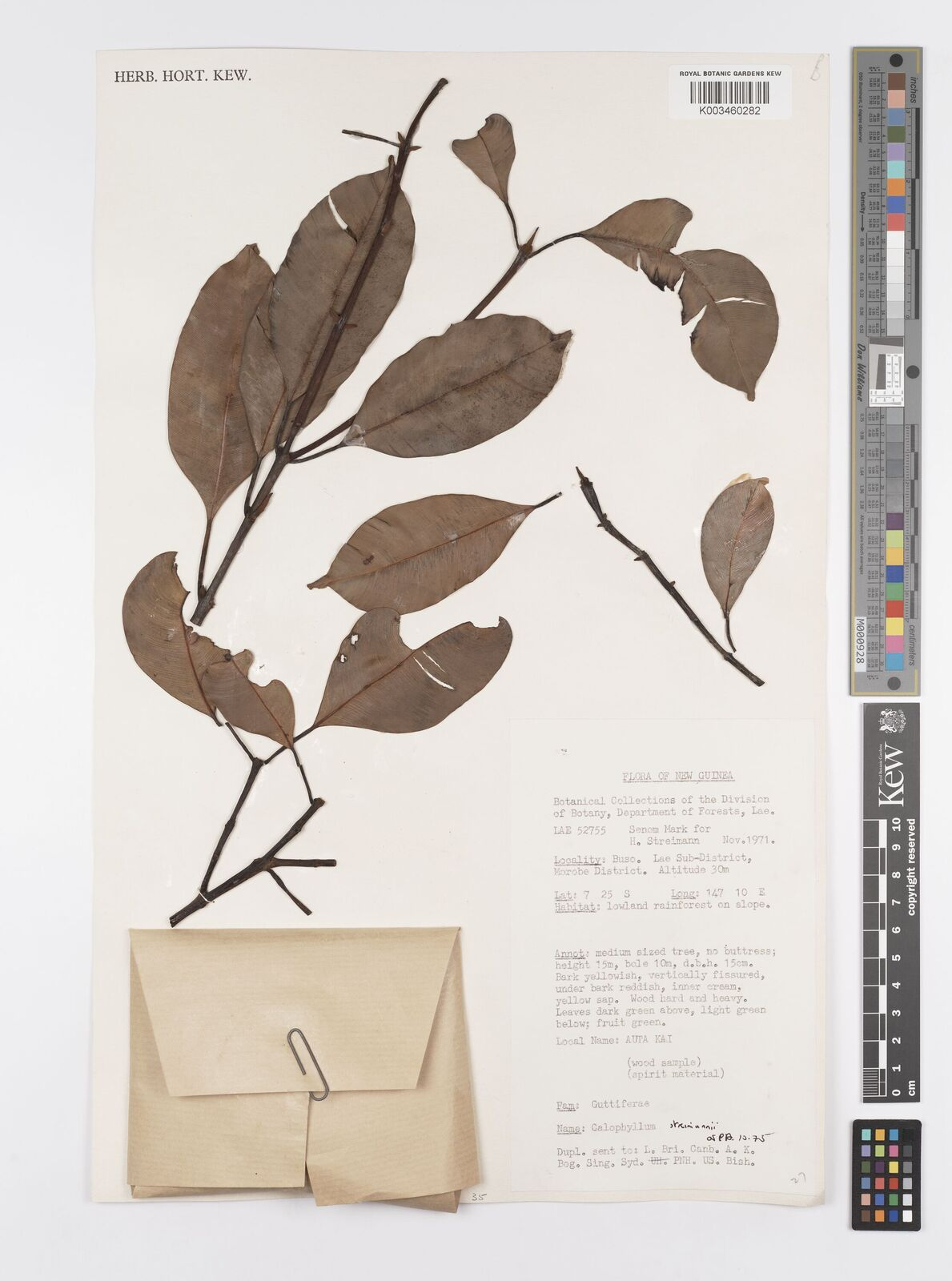

Conservation status
- Endangered (IUCN 3.1)

Scientific classification
- Kingdom: Plantae
- Clade: Tracheophytes
- Clade: Angiosperms
- Clade: Eudicots
- Clade: Rosids
- Order: Malpighiales
- Family: Calophyllaceae
- Genus: Calophyllum
- Species: C. streimannii

Binomial name
- Calophyllum streimannii P.F.Stevens

= Calophyllum streimannii =

Species of flowering plant

Calophyllum streimannii is a species of flowering plant in the Calophyllaceae family. It is a tree endemic to eastern New Guinea, where it is known only from Morobe Province of Papua New Guinea. It is a large tree which grows 15 to 35 metres tall. It is native to lowland rain forest, where it grows on ridges and hillsides from 30 to 300 metres elevation, often in association with dipterocarp trees.

The species was described by Peter F. Stevens in 1974.
