= Calophyllum peekelii =

Conservation status
- Least Concern (IUCN 3.1)

Scientific classification
- Kingdom: Plantae
- Clade: Tracheophytes
- Clade: Angiosperms
- Clade: Eudicots
- Clade: Rosids
- Order: Malpighiales
- Family: Calophyllaceae
- Genus: Calophyllum
- Species: C. peekelii

Binomial name
- Calophyllum peekelii Lauterb.

Synonyms
- Calophyllum kajewskii A.C.Sm.

Species of tree

Calophyllum peekelii is a species of flowering plant in the Calophyllaceae family. It is found in Indonesia (Western New Guinea), Papua New Guinea (eastern New Guinea and the Bismarck Archipelago), and the Solomon Islands.
