= Calophyllum pauciflorum =

Conservation status
- Least Concern (IUCN 3.1)

Scientific classification
- Kingdom: Plantae
- Clade: Tracheophytes
- Clade: Angiosperms
- Clade: Eudicots
- Clade: Rosids
- Order: Malpighiales
- Family: Calophyllaceae
- Genus: Calophyllum
- Species: C. pauciflorum

Binomial name
- Calophyllum pauciflorum A.C.Sm.

Synonyms
- Calophyllum congestiflorum A.C.Sm.

Species of flowering plant

Calophyllum pauciflorum is a species of flowering plant in the Calophyllaceae family. It is a tree endemic to New Guinea (Papua New Guinea and Western New Guinea region of Indonesia).

The species was described by Albert Charles Smith in 1941.
