= Calophyllum collinum =

Conservation status
- Endangered (IUCN 3.1)

Scientific classification
- Kingdom: Plantae
- Clade: Tracheophytes
- Clade: Angiosperms
- Clade: Eudicots
- Clade: Rosids
- Order: Malpighiales
- Family: Calophyllaceae
- Genus: Calophyllum
- Species: C. collinum

Binomial name
- Calophyllum collinum P.F.Stevens

Species of flowering plant

Calophyllum collinum is a species of flowering plant in the Calophyllaceae family. It is a tree native to central and eastern New Guinea, known from the Snow Mountains of Western New Guinea (Indonesia) and Western and Morobe provinces of Papua New Guinea. It is a large tree which grows 22 to 36 metres tall. It is native to lowland and hill rain forests up to 500 metres elevation. The species is known from few collections, and its known range and population are small. It is threatened with habitat loss from logging and expansion of agriculture, and the IUCN Red List assesses the species as Endangered.

The species was described by Peter F. Stevens in 1980.
