= Calophyllum heterophyllum =

Conservation status
- Endangered (IUCN 3.1)

Scientific classification
- Kingdom: Plantae
- Clade: Tracheophytes
- Clade: Angiosperms
- Clade: Eudicots
- Clade: Rosids
- Order: Malpighiales
- Family: Calophyllaceae
- Genus: Calophyllum
- Species: C. heterophyllum

Binomial name
- Calophyllum heterophyllum P.F.Stevens

Species of flowering plant

Calophyllum heterophyllum is a species of flowering plant in the Calophyllaceae family. It a shrub or tree endemic to New Guinea. It is known from the Vogelkop Peninsula and Snow Mountains of Western New Guinea (Indonesia) and from Western Province of Papua New Guinea. It can grow up to 29 metres tall as a canopy tree on low ridges (approximately 100 metres elevation) in lowland rain forest, but more often grows as shrubs or small trees on poor loam soils in montane rain forest from 1,200 to 1,300 metres elevation.

The species was described by Peter F. Stevens in 1974.
