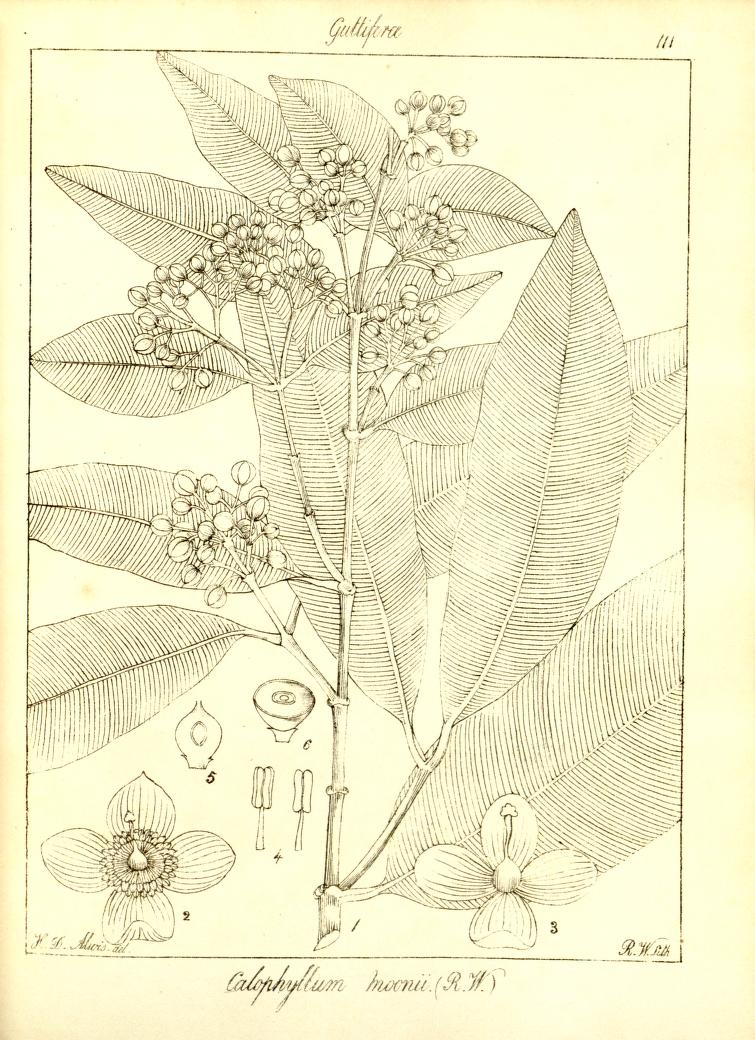
- Illustration by H. de Alwis

Conservation status
- Vulnerable (IUCN 2.3)

Scientific classification
- Kingdom: Plantae
- Clade: Tracheophytes
- Clade: Angiosperms
- Clade: Eudicots
- Clade: Rosids
- Order: Malpighiales
- Family: Calophyllaceae
- Genus: Calophyllum
- Species: C. moonii

Binomial name
- Calophyllum moonii Wight

= Calophyllum moonii =

Species of flowering plant

Calophyllum moonii is a species of flowering plant in the Calophyllaceae family. The GBIF and IUCN state it is only found in southwestern Sri Lanka, while Plants of the World Online states it is also found in southern India. It is a tree which grows in evergreen lowland rain forest.
