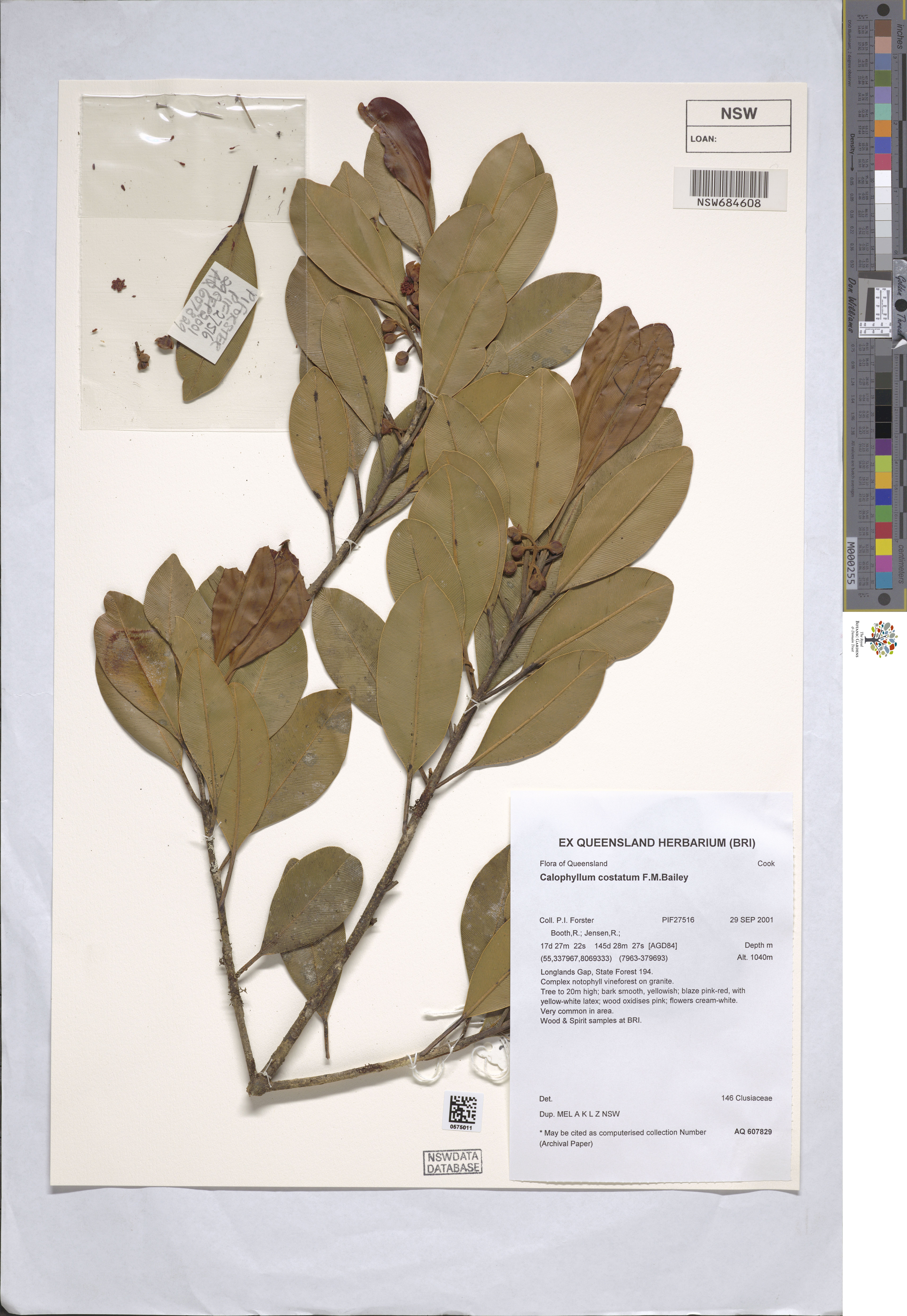
- Herbarium specimen

Conservation status
- Least Concern (IUCN 3.1)

Scientific classification
- Kingdom: Plantae
- Clade: Tracheophytes
- Clade: Angiosperms
- Clade: Eudicots
- Clade: Rosids
- Order: Malpighiales
- Family: Calophyllaceae
- Genus: Calophyllum
- Species: C. costatum

Binomial name
- Calophyllum costatum F.M.Bailey

= Calophyllum costatum =

Species of flowering plant

Calophyllum costatum, commonly known as red touriga, is a species of plant in the family Calophyllaceae, first described in 1899. It is endemic to the Atherton Tableland area of Queensland, Australia.

== Description ==
Calophyllum costatum is a tree growing to about 30 m (98 ft) tall. The leaves are ovate (broader at the base) to elliptic and have numerous, straight, closely-set veins on either side of the midrib. They may reach up to 9 cm (3.5 in) long and 4 cm (1.6 in) wide, and are attached to the twigs by a petiole (botany) about 13 mm (0.5 in) long. The inflorescence is unbranched. The flowers are about 15 mm (0.59 in) diameter and have eight tepals and between 95 and 140 stamens. The fruit is somewhat egg-shaped, with the broadest part near the base and the apex slightly pointed. They may grow to about 4.5 cm (1.8 in) long.

== Distribution and habitat ==
This species occurs in the Atherton Tableland area, from about Mareeba to about Ravenshoe, and grows in rainforest, commonly on ridges at altitudes from 700 to 1,200 m (2,300 to 3,900 ft).

== Conservation ==
As of June 2026, this species has been assessed to be of least concern by the International Union for Conservation of Nature (IUCN), and by the Queensland Government under its Nature Conservation Act.

== Gallery ==
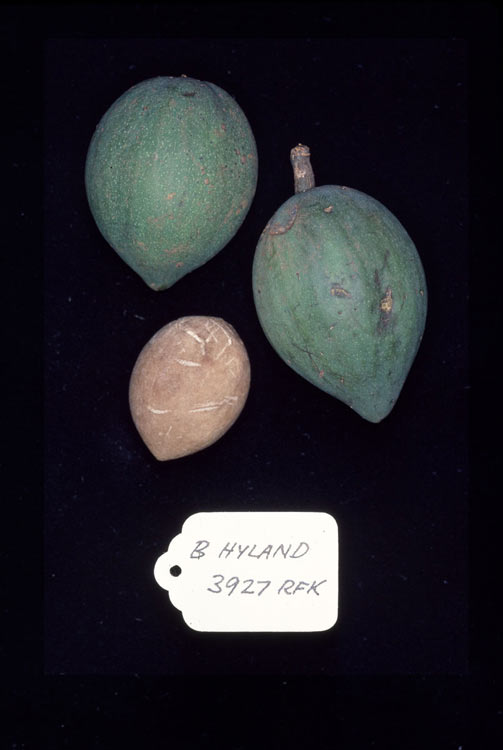
Fruit

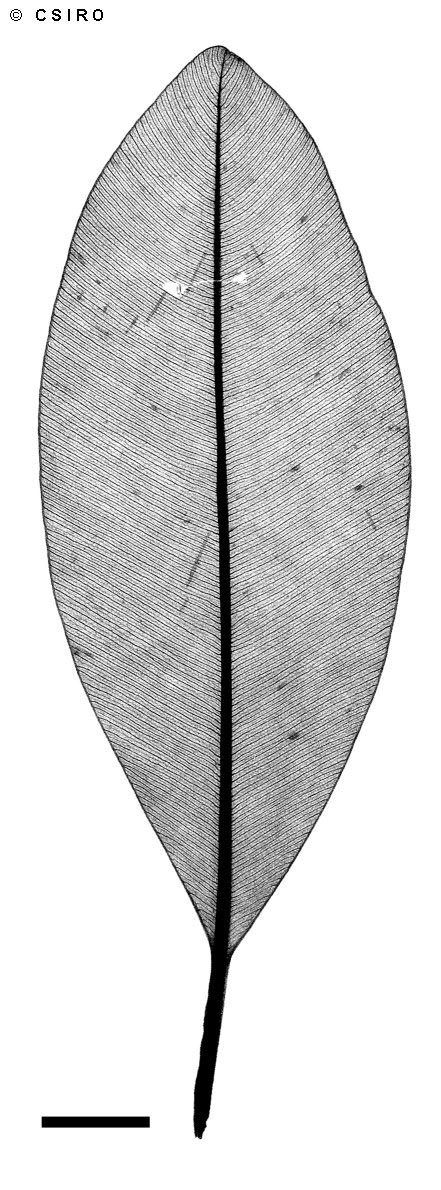
X-ray of leaf
