= Calophyllum papuanum =

Conservation status
- Least Concern (IUCN 3.1)

Scientific classification
- Kingdom: Plantae
- Clade: Tracheophytes
- Clade: Angiosperms
- Clade: Eudicots
- Clade: Rosids
- Order: Malpighiales
- Family: Calophyllaceae
- Genus: Calophyllum
- Species: C. papuanum

Binomial name
- Calophyllum papuanum Lauterb.

Species of tree

Calophyllum papuanum is a species of flowering plant in the Calophyllaceae family. It is found in the Maluku Islands of Indonesia and New Guinea (Indonesia and Papua New Guinea).
