= Calophyllum thwaitesii =

Conservation status
- Vulnerable (IUCN 2.3)

Scientific classification
- Kingdom: Plantae
- Clade: Tracheophytes
- Clade: Angiosperms
- Clade: Eudicots
- Clade: Rosids
- Order: Malpighiales
- Family: Calophyllaceae
- Genus: Calophyllum
- Species: C. thwaitesii

Binomial name
- Calophyllum thwaitesii Planch. & Triana

Species of flowering plant

Calophyllum thwaitesii is a species of flowering plant in the Calophyllaceae family. It is a tree found only in south-central and southwestern Sri Lanka, where it grows in lowland evergreen rain forest.

== Culture ==
Known as බ‍ටු කින ( batu kina ) in Sinhala.
