= Calophyllum goniocarpum =

Conservation status
- Least Concern (IUCN 3.1)

Scientific classification
- Kingdom: Plantae
- Clade: Tracheophytes
- Clade: Angiosperms
- Clade: Eudicots
- Clade: Rosids
- Order: Malpighiales
- Family: Calophyllaceae
- Genus: Calophyllum
- Species: C. goniocarpum

Binomial name
- Calophyllum goniocarpum P.F.Stevens

Species of tree

Calophyllum goniocarpum is a species of flowering plant in the Calophyllaceae family. It is a tree native to the Maluku Islands of Indonesia and to New Guinea, which is divided between Indonesia and Papua New Guinea.
