= Calophyllum trapezifolium =

Conservation status
- Endangered (IUCN 2.3)

Scientific classification
- Kingdom: Plantae
- Clade: Tracheophytes
- Clade: Angiosperms
- Clade: Eudicots
- Clade: Rosids
- Order: Malpighiales
- Family: Calophyllaceae
- Genus: Calophyllum
- Species: C. trapezifolium

Binomial name
- Calophyllum trapezifolium Thwaites

Synonyms
- Calophyllum zeylanicum Kosterm.

Species of flowering plant

Calophyllum trapezifolium is a species of flowering plant in the Calophyllaceae family. It is a tree endemic to central and south-central Sri Lanka. It grows mostly in upper montane rain forests, and occasionally in lowland rain forests.
