= Calophyllum novoguineense =

Conservation status
- Least Concern (IUCN 2.3)

Scientific classification
- Kingdom: Plantae
- Clade: Tracheophytes
- Clade: Angiosperms
- Clade: Eudicots
- Clade: Rosids
- Order: Malpighiales
- Family: Calophyllaceae
- Genus: Calophyllum
- Species: C. novoguineense

Binomial name
- Calophyllum novoguineense Kan. & Hat.

Species of flowering plant

Calophyllum novoguineense is a species of flowering plant in the Calophyllaceae family. It is found in West Papua (Indonesia) and Papua New Guinea.
