= Calophyllum obscurum =

Conservation status
- Vulnerable (IUCN 2.3)

Scientific classification
- Kingdom: Plantae
- Clade: Tracheophytes
- Clade: Angiosperms
- Clade: Eudicots
- Clade: Rosids
- Order: Malpighiales
- Family: Calophyllaceae
- Genus: Calophyllum
- Species: C. obscurum

Binomial name
- Calophyllum obscurum P.F.Stevens

Species of flowering plant

Calophyllum obscurum is a species of flowering plant in the Calophyllaceae family. It is a tree found only in the Solomon Islands.
