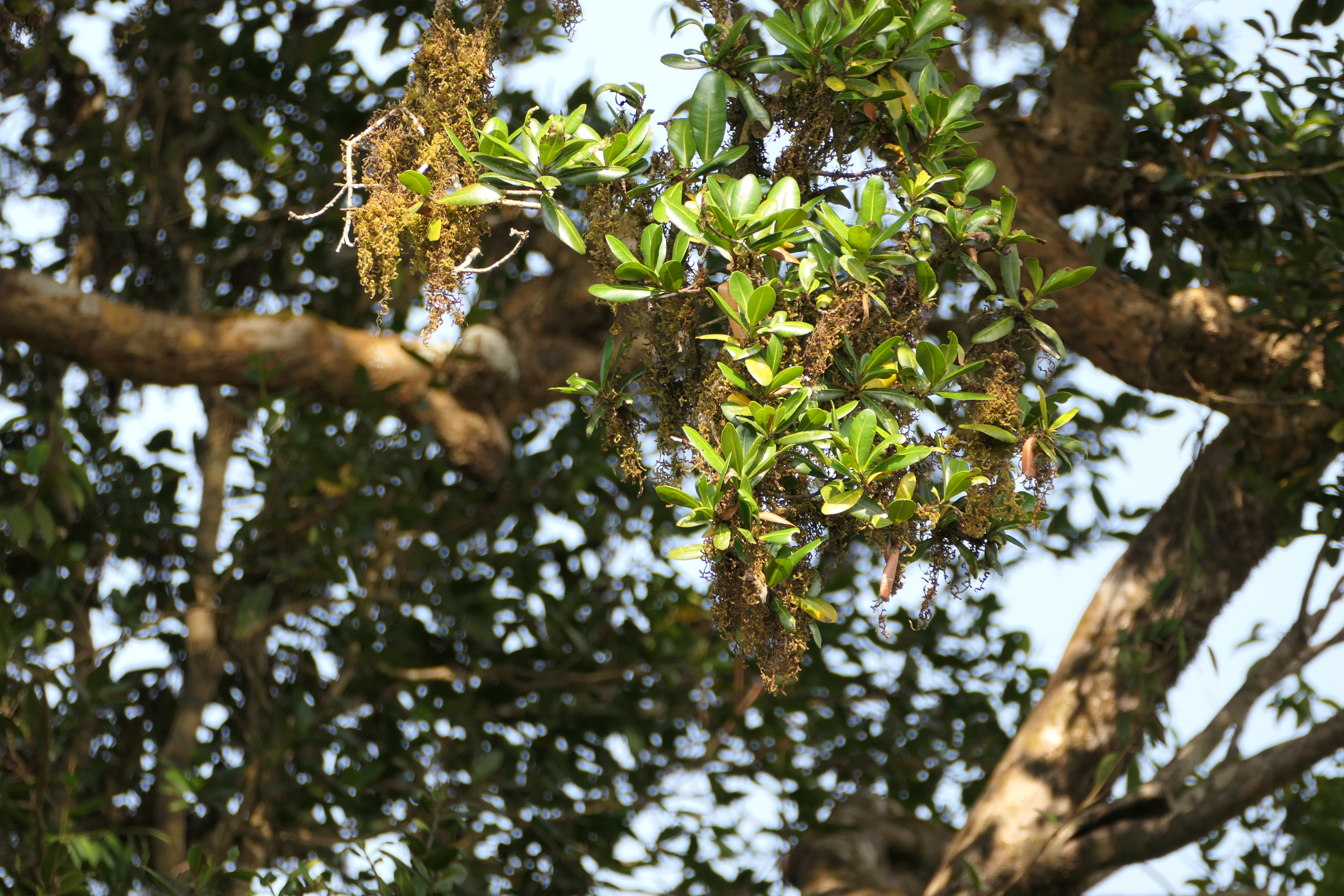

Conservation status
- Vulnerable (IUCN 3.1)

Scientific classification
- Kingdom: Plantae
- Clade: Tracheophytes
- Clade: Angiosperms
- Clade: Eudicots
- Clade: Rosids
- Order: Malpighiales
- Family: Calophyllaceae
- Genus: Calophyllum
- Species: C. apetalum

Binomial name
- Calophyllum apetalum Willd.

= Calophyllum apetalum =

Species of plant

Calophyllum apetalum is a species of tree endemic to the Western Ghats region of India. It is also called as the Konkan beauty leaf tree or Poon spar of Travancore.

== Description ==
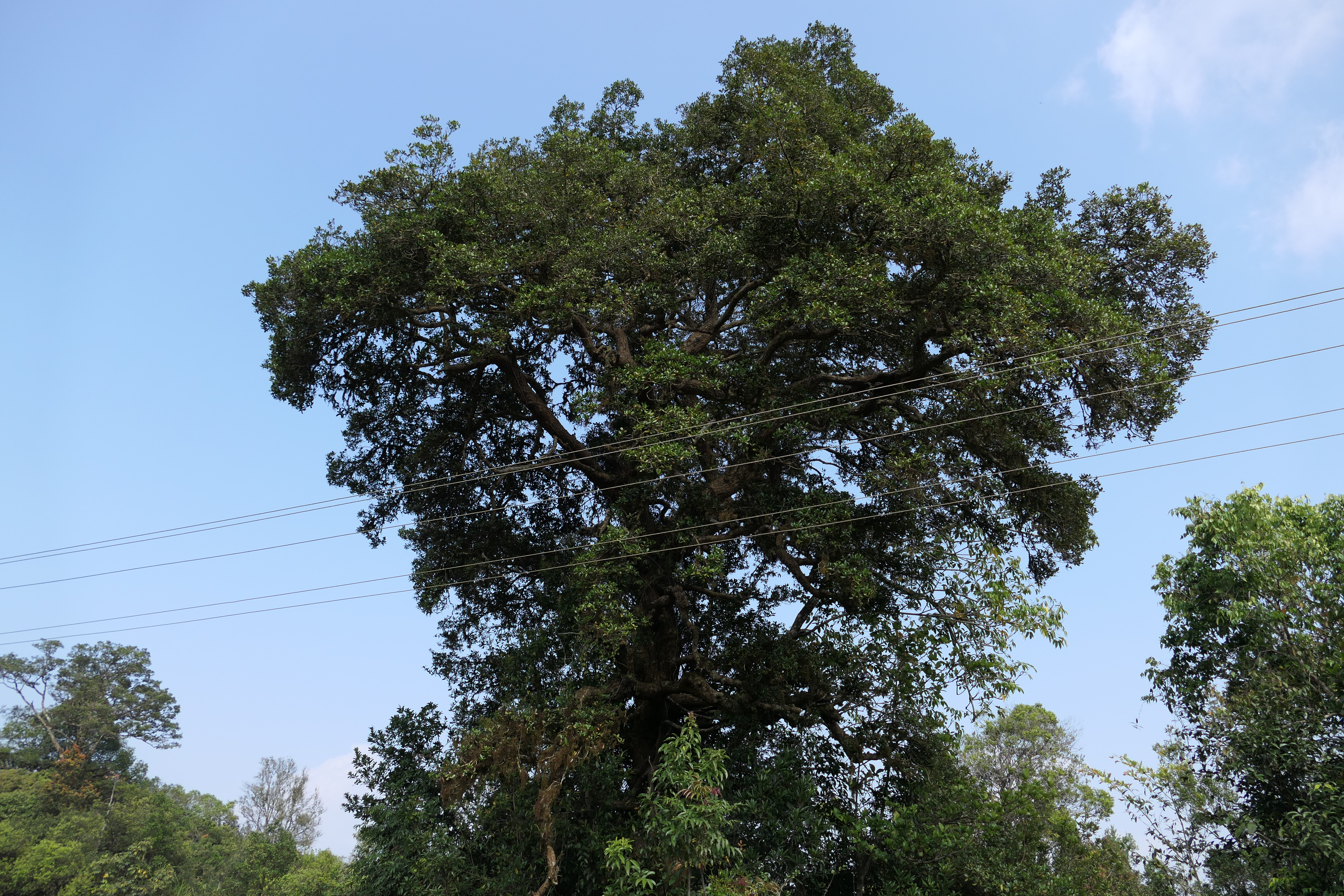
Full view.

Calophyllum apetalum is an evergreen tree reaching up to 30 meters in height. It features yellowish outer bark with distinct boat-shaped fissures and reddish blaze. Its leaves are simple, opposite, and glossy above, typically obovate to inverted-lanceolate in shape. The tree produces white flowers in leaf-axil panicles, with bisexual characteristics. The flowers have 4 rarely 3 sepals, white and petal-like, and lack petals. Stamens are numerous and free, while the drupe is yellowish-brown, ovoid to ellipsoid, and about 1.5 cm long, containing a single seed.

== Taxonomy ==
In Tamil, it is known as Chirupunnai (சிறுபுன்னை), While in Malayalam it is similarly called Manja punna (മഞ്ഞപ്പുന്ന), Cherupunna (ചെറുപുന്ന) and Attupunna (ആറ്റുപുന്ന). In Kannada, it is called Kalhonne (ಕಲ್ಹೊನ್ನೆ), Bobbi(ಬೊಬ್ಬಿ), Irai (ಇರೈ). These names might be synoymous to other native names of Calophyllum species.

== Distribution ==
It is endemic to the Western Ghats, where its only found in the central and southern parts of the region.

== Habitat & ecology ==
In evergreen forests and backwaters along the west coast, especially near rivers and streams, it's typical to find Calophyllum apetalum at low elevations, reaching up to 600 meters (or 1300 feet).

== Human uses ==
Mature fruits have a sweet taste and are commonly consumed locally. The oil extracted from the seeds is greenish-yellow and has a distinct smell, often utilized as a fuel for lamps. The wood, which has a light reddish-white or pale reddish-brown color with darker streaks, finds applications in construction, bridges, boats, oil-mills, cabinet making, building structures, and even in crafting matchboxes. The resin serves medicinal purposes as a healing, resolving, and pain-relieving agent, while the seed oil is employed in treating conditions like rheumatism and leprosy.
