= Calophyllum chapelieri =

Conservation status
- Vulnerable (IUCN 3.1)

Scientific classification
- Kingdom: Plantae
- Clade: Tracheophytes
- Clade: Angiosperms
- Clade: Eudicots
- Clade: Rosids
- Order: Malpighiales
- Family: Calophyllaceae
- Genus: Calophyllum
- Species: C. chapelieri

Binomial name
- Calophyllum chapelieri Drake

Species of flowering plant

Calophyllum chapelieri is a species of flowering plant in the Calophyllaceae family. It is found only in Madagascar, where it lives in the island's eastern lowland rain forests.

== Description ==
Calophyllum chapelieri is a tree which grows from 4 to 25 meters high. It flowers from October to February, and fruits from October to June.

== Range and habitat ==
Calophyllum chapelieri is native to eastern Madagascar, ranging along the eastern coastal lowlands from Masoala to Manakara, in Atsinanana, Analanjorofo and Vatovavy Fitovinany regions (former provinces of Fianarantsoa and Toamasina). It inhabits moist lowland forest from 10 to 557 meters elevation.

It is known from 13 locations, with an estimated extent of occurrence (EOO) of 11,326 km^{2}, and a minimum area of occupancy (AOO) of 104 km^{2}.

The tree is threatened with habitat loss from shifting cultivation, deforestation for timber harvesting and agriculture, and urbanization. The species' conservation status is assessed as near threatened.
