= Calophyllum pisiferum =

Conservation status
- Least Concern (IUCN 3.1)

Scientific classification
- Kingdom: Plantae
- Clade: Tracheophytes
- Clade: Angiosperms
- Clade: Eudicots
- Clade: Rosids
- Order: Malpighiales
- Family: Calophyllaceae
- Genus: Calophyllum
- Species: C. pisiferum

Binomial name
- Calophyllum pisiferum Planch. & Triana

Synonyms
- Calophyllum motleyi Ridl.; Calophyllum retusum var. cambodgense Pit.; Calophyllum retusum var. cochinchinense Pit.; Calophyllum sangkae Craib

Species of flowering plant

Calophyllum pisiferum is a species of flowering plant in the Calophyllaceae family. It is native to Indochina (Cambodia, Laos, Myanmar, Thailand, and Vietnam) and western Malesia (Peninsular Malaysia, Borneo, and Sumatra in Malaysia and Indonesia)

The species was described by Jules Émile Planchon and José Jerónimo Triana in 1861.
