= Calophyllum persimile =

Conservation status
- Endangered (IUCN 3.1)

Scientific classification
- Kingdom: Plantae
- Clade: Tracheophytes
- Clade: Angiosperms
- Clade: Eudicots
- Clade: Rosids
- Order: Malpighiales
- Family: Calophyllaceae
- Genus: Calophyllum
- Species: C. persimile

Binomial name
- Calophyllum persimile P.F.Stevens

Species of flowering plant

Calophyllum persimile is a species of flowering plant in the Calophyllaceae family. It is a tree endemic to New Guinea, where it is known from Kiunga district in Western Province and near Vanimo in West Sepik Province of Papua New Guinea. It grows 20 to 25 metres tall and flowers in September. It grows in well-drained and wet-season inundated lowland rain forests from 20 to 580 metres elevation.

The species was described by Peter F. Stevens in 1980.
