= Calophyllum hirasimum =

Conservation status
- Vulnerable (IUCN 3.1)

Scientific classification
- Kingdom: Plantae
- Clade: Tracheophytes
- Clade: Angiosperms
- Clade: Eudicots
- Clade: Rosids
- Order: Malpighiales
- Family: Calophyllaceae
- Genus: Calophyllum
- Species: C. hirasimum

Binomial name
- Calophyllum hirasimum P.F.Stevens

Species of flowering plant

Calophyllum hirasimum is a species of flowering plant in the Calophyllaceae family. It is a tree endemic to Western New Guinea in Indonesia. It grows 4 to 18 metres tall. It is native to the Arfak Mountains and Wissel Lake region of the Bird's Head Peninsula, where it grows in montane rain forest from 1,750 to 2,150 metres elevation. It is locally abundant in Nothofagus–conifer forest and in scrub of Myrtaceae, Ericaceae, and Nothofagus growing on clay soils.

The species was described by Peter F. Stevens in 1980.
