= Calophyllum savannarum =

Conservation status
- Vulnerable (IUCN 2.3)

Scientific classification
- Kingdom: Plantae
- Clade: Tracheophytes
- Clade: Angiosperms
- Clade: Eudicots
- Clade: Rosids
- Order: Malpighiales
- Family: Calophyllaceae
- Genus: Calophyllum
- Species: C. savannarum

Binomial name
- Calophyllum savannarum A.C.Sm.

Species of flowering plant

Calophyllum savannarum is a species of flowering plant in the Calophyllaceae family. It is a tree found only in Western New Guinea in Indonesia, where it is known from Yapen island and near Jayapura on northwestern mainland New Guinea. It grows in secondary rain forest and as the predominant tree in forest clumps in secondary savanna.

The species was described by Albert Charles Smith in 1941.
