= Tacamahac =

Plant resin

Tacamahac is the name of medicinal resins, now little used, obtained from several plant sources including Calophyllum tacamahaca and Calophyllum inophyllum.

The word has sometimes been regarded, apparently wrongly, as a synonym of balm of Gilead.
