= Calophyllum acidus =

Scientific classification
- Kingdom: Plantae
- Clade: Embryophytes
- Clade: Tracheophytes
- Clade: Spermatophytes
- Clade: Angiosperms
- Clade: Eudicots
- Clade: Rosids
- Order: Malpighiales
- Family: Calophyllaceae
- Genus: Calophyllum
- Species: C. acidus

Binomial name
- Calophyllum acidus Kosterm.

Synonyms
- Calophyllum burmanni var. parvifolium Wight; Calophyllum calaba var. worthingtonii P.F.Stevens

Species of flowering plant

Calophyllum acidus is a species of flowering plant in the family Calophyllaceae. It is found only in southern Sri Lanka.

== Bibliography ==
- Kostermans, André Joseph Guillaume Henri (1982). "Notes on Ceylonese Plants II". Acta Botanica Neerlandica. 31 (1–2): 121–132. doi:10.1111/j.1438-8677.1982.tb01598.x.
