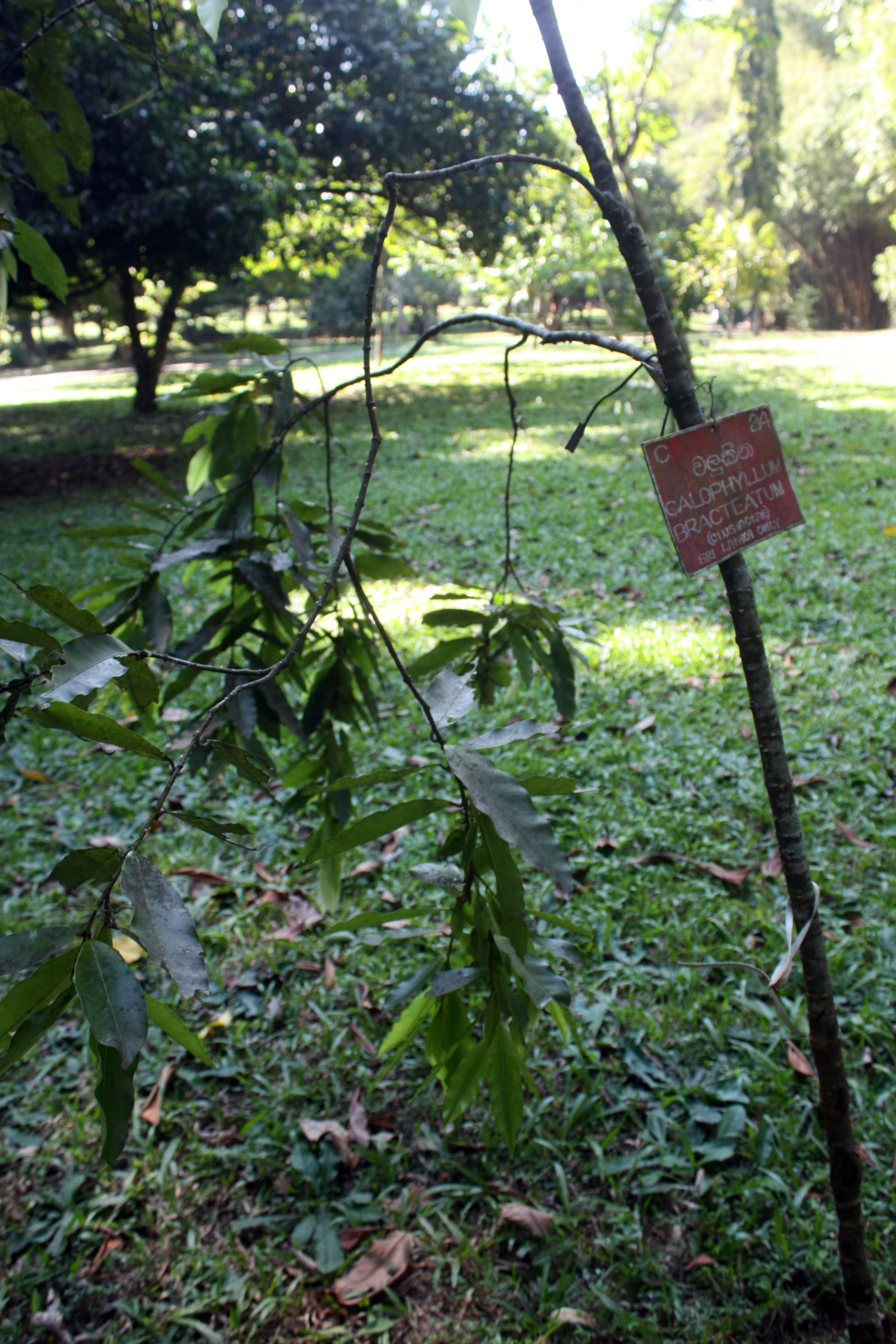

Conservation status
- Vulnerable (IUCN 2.3)

Scientific classification
- Kingdom: Plantae
- Clade: Tracheophytes
- Clade: Angiosperms
- Clade: Eudicots
- Clade: Rosids
- Order: Malpighiales
- Family: Calophyllaceae
- Genus: Calophyllum
- Species: C. bracteatum

Binomial name
- Calophyllum bracteatum Thwaites

= Calophyllum bracteatum =

Species of flowering plant

Calophyllum bracteatum is a species of flowering plant in the Calophyllaceae family. It is a tree found only in south-central and southwestern Sri Lanka, where it is known as වලු කින (walu kina) by local people.
