= Calophyllum laticostatum =

Conservation status
- Near Threatened (IUCN 3.1)

Scientific classification
- Kingdom: Plantae
- Clade: Tracheophytes
- Clade: Angiosperms
- Clade: Eudicots
- Clade: Rosids
- Order: Malpighiales
- Family: Calophyllaceae
- Genus: Calophyllum
- Species: C. laticostatum

Binomial name
- Calophyllum laticostatum P. F. Stevens

Species of flowering plant

Calophyllum laticostatum is a species of flowering plant in the Calophyllaceae family. It is found in Papua New Guinea and possibly the Philippines.
