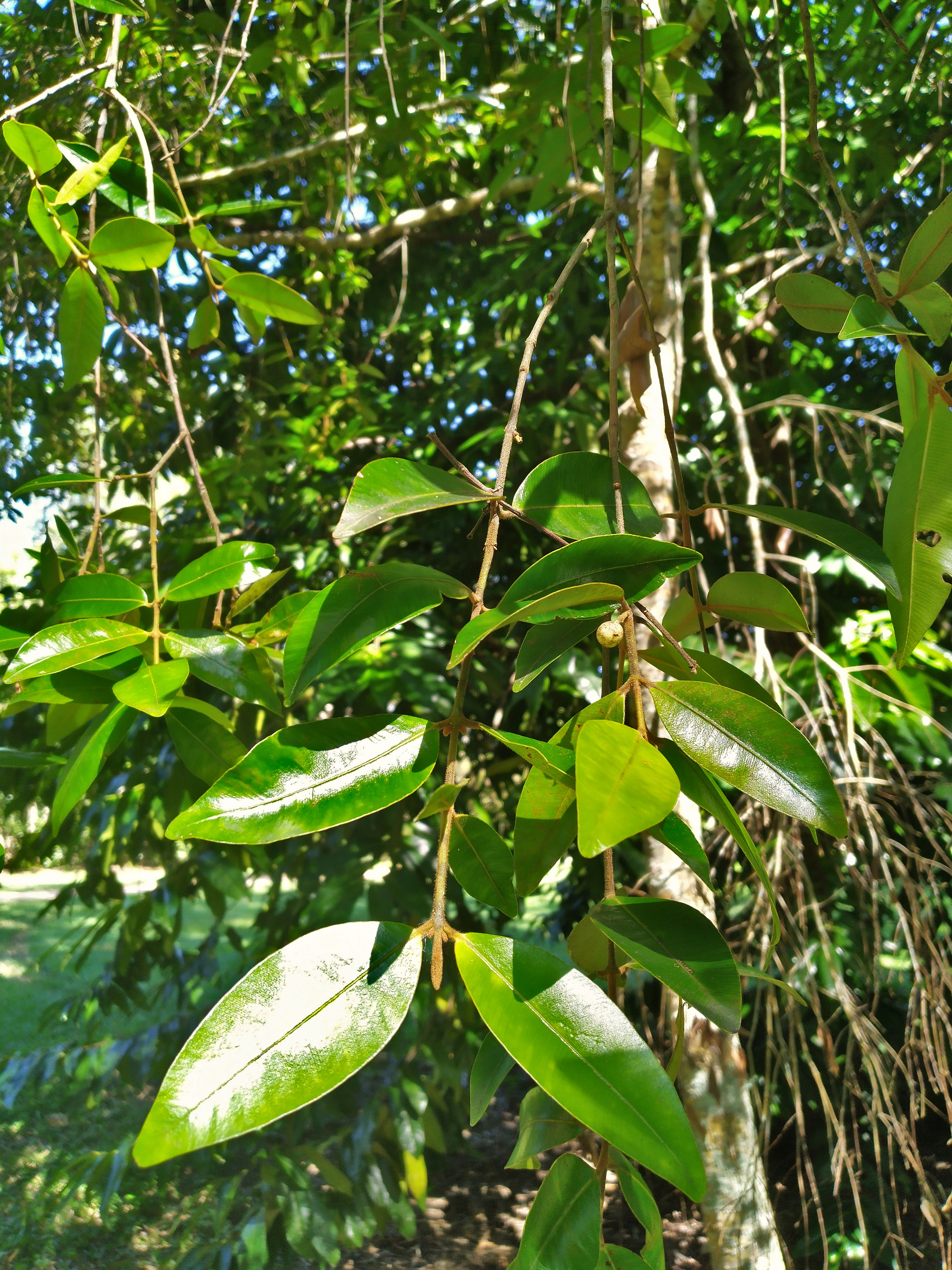
- In Cairns, Australia

Conservation status
- Near Threatened (IUCN 3.1)

Scientific classification
- Kingdom: Plantae
- Clade: Tracheophytes
- Clade: Angiosperms
- Clade: Eudicots
- Clade: Rosids
- Order: Malpighiales
- Family: Calophyllaceae
- Genus: Calophyllum
- Species: C. bicolor

Binomial name
- Calophyllum bicolor P.F.Stevens

= Calophyllum bicolor =

Species of tree

Calophyllum bicolor is a species of flowering plant in the family Calophyllaceae. It is a tree native to New Guinea and the Cape York Peninsula of Queensland in northeastern Australia.
