= Calophyllum nubicola =

Conservation status
- Vulnerable (IUCN 3.1)

Scientific classification
- Kingdom: Plantae
- Clade: Tracheophytes
- Clade: Angiosperms
- Clade: Eudicots
- Clade: Rosids
- Order: Malpighiales
- Family: Calophyllaceae
- Genus: Calophyllum
- Species: C. nubicola

Binomial name
- Calophyllum nubicola D'Arcy & R.C.Keating

Species of flowering plant

Calophyllum nubicola is a species of flowering plant in the Calophyllaceae family. It is a tree endemic to Panama, where it is found on Cerro Jefe and surrounding areas of the southern Chagres Highlands. It grows in submontane rain forest from 700 to 844 meters elevation. It is threatened by habitat loss.
