= Calophyllum elegans =

Conservation status
- Endangered (IUCN 3.1)

Scientific classification
- Kingdom: Plantae
- Clade: Tracheophytes
- Clade: Angiosperms
- Clade: Eudicots
- Clade: Rosids
- Order: Malpighiales
- Family: Calophyllaceae
- Genus: Calophyllum
- Species: C. elegans

Binomial name
- Calophyllum elegans Ridl. (1938)

Species of flowering plant

Calophyllum elegans is a species of tropical flowering plants in the family Calophyllaceae. It grows as a 9.1 m (30 feet) tall tree. It is an endangered species native to Borneo, where it is confined to western Sarawak.

It grows on sandy clay soil at the edge of swamp forest, kerangas forest, and mixed dipterocarp forests below 580 meters elevation.
