= Calophyllum tetrapterum =

Conservation status
- Least Concern (IUCN 3.1)

Scientific classification
- Kingdom: Plantae
- Clade: Tracheophytes
- Clade: Angiosperms
- Clade: Eudicots
- Clade: Rosids
- Order: Malpighiales
- Family: Calophyllaceae
- Genus: Calophyllum
- Species: C. tetrapterum

Binomial name
- Calophyllum tetrapterum Miq.

Varieties
- Calophyllum tetrapterum var. blumutense (M.R.Hend. & Wyatt-Sm.) P.F.Stevens; Calophyllum tetrapterum var. obovale (Miq.) P.F.Stevens; Calophyllum tetrapterum var. tetrapterum

Synonyms
- synonyms of var. blumutense: Calophyllum blumutense M.R.Hend. & Wyatt-Sm.; synonyms of var. obovale: Calophyllum obovale Miq.; Calophyllum globuliferum Ridl.; Calophyllum griffithii T.Anderson; synonyms of var. tetrapterum: Calophyllum bancanum Miq.; Calophyllum floribundum Hook.f.; Calophyllum foetidum Ridl.; Calophyllum gracile Miq.; Calophyllum lanceola Ridl.; Calophyllum prainianum King; Calophyllum pulcherrimum var. gracile (Miq.) Boerl.; Calophyllum rupicola var. elatum Whitmore; Calophyllum venustum King

Species of flowering plant

Calophyllum tetrapterum is a species of flowering plant in the Calophyllaceae family. It is a shrub or tree native to Indochina (the Andaman Islands, Cambodia, Laos, Myanmar, Thailand, and Vietnam) and western Malesia (Peninsular Malaysia, Singapore, Borneo, Java, and Sumatra, in Malaysia, Brunei, and part of Indonesia).

The species was described by Friedrich Anton Wilhelm Miquel in 1854. Three varieties are accepted.

- Calophyllum tetrapterum var. blumutense (M.R.Hend. & Wyatt-Sm.) P.F.Stevens – Johor in Peninsular Malaysia
- Calophyllum tetrapterum var. obovale (Miq.) P.F.Stevens – Borneo, Peninsular Malaysia, and Sumatra
- Calophyllum tetrapterum var. tetrapterum – Indochina, Peninsular Malaysia, Singapore, Borneo, Java, and Sumatra
