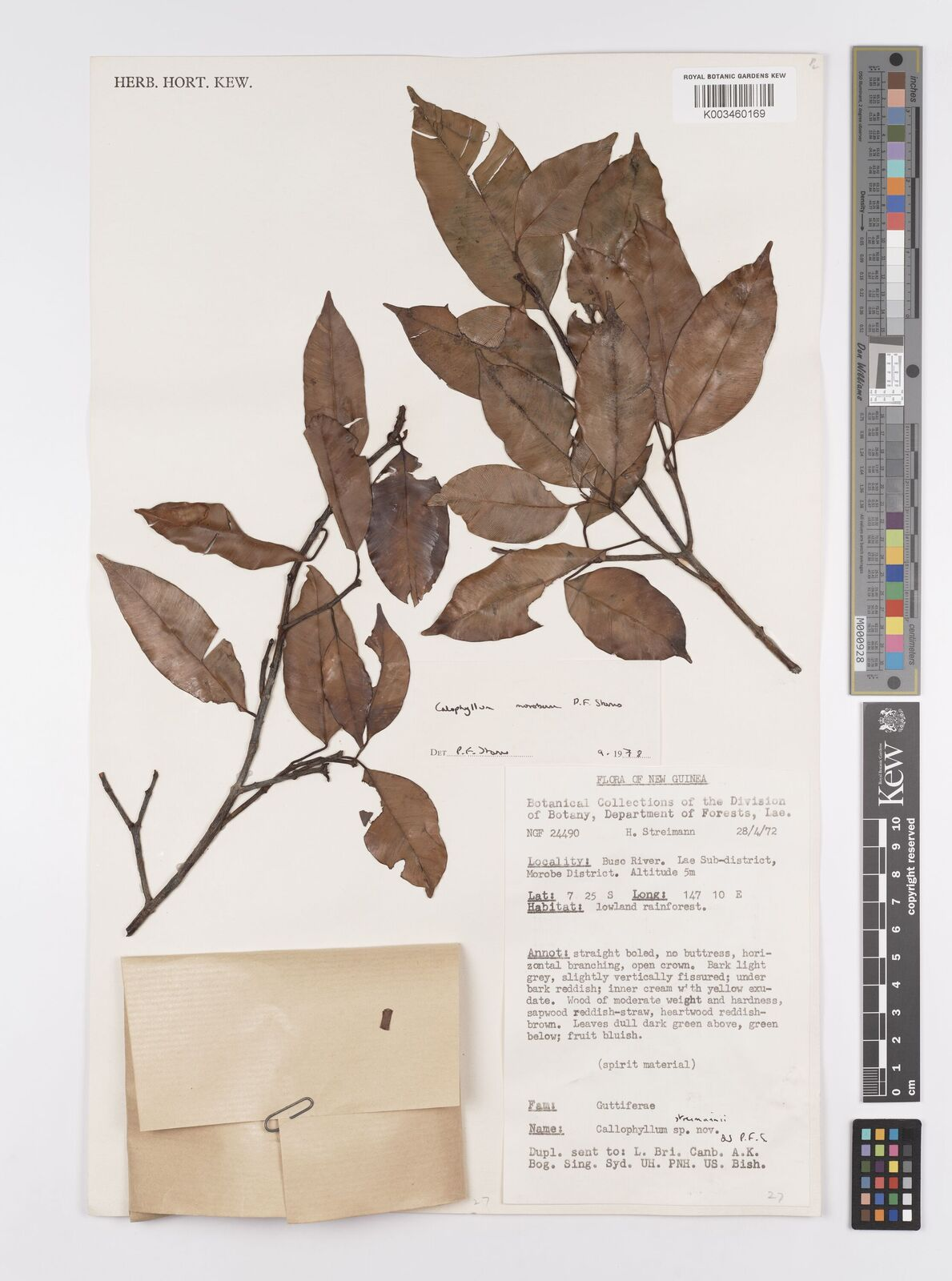

Conservation status
- Vulnerable (IUCN 3.1)

Scientific classification
- Kingdom: Plantae
- Clade: Tracheophytes
- Clade: Angiosperms
- Clade: Eudicots
- Clade: Rosids
- Order: Malpighiales
- Family: Calophyllaceae
- Genus: Calophyllum
- Species: C. morobensis

Binomial name
- Calophyllum morobensis P.F.Stevens

= Calophyllum morobensis =

Species of flowering plant

Calophyllum morobensis is a species of flowering plant in the Calophyllaceae family. It is a tree found only in Papua New Guinea. It is known only from Morobe Province in eastern New Guinea, where it grows in lowland rainforest on alluvium. It is threatened by habitat loss.
