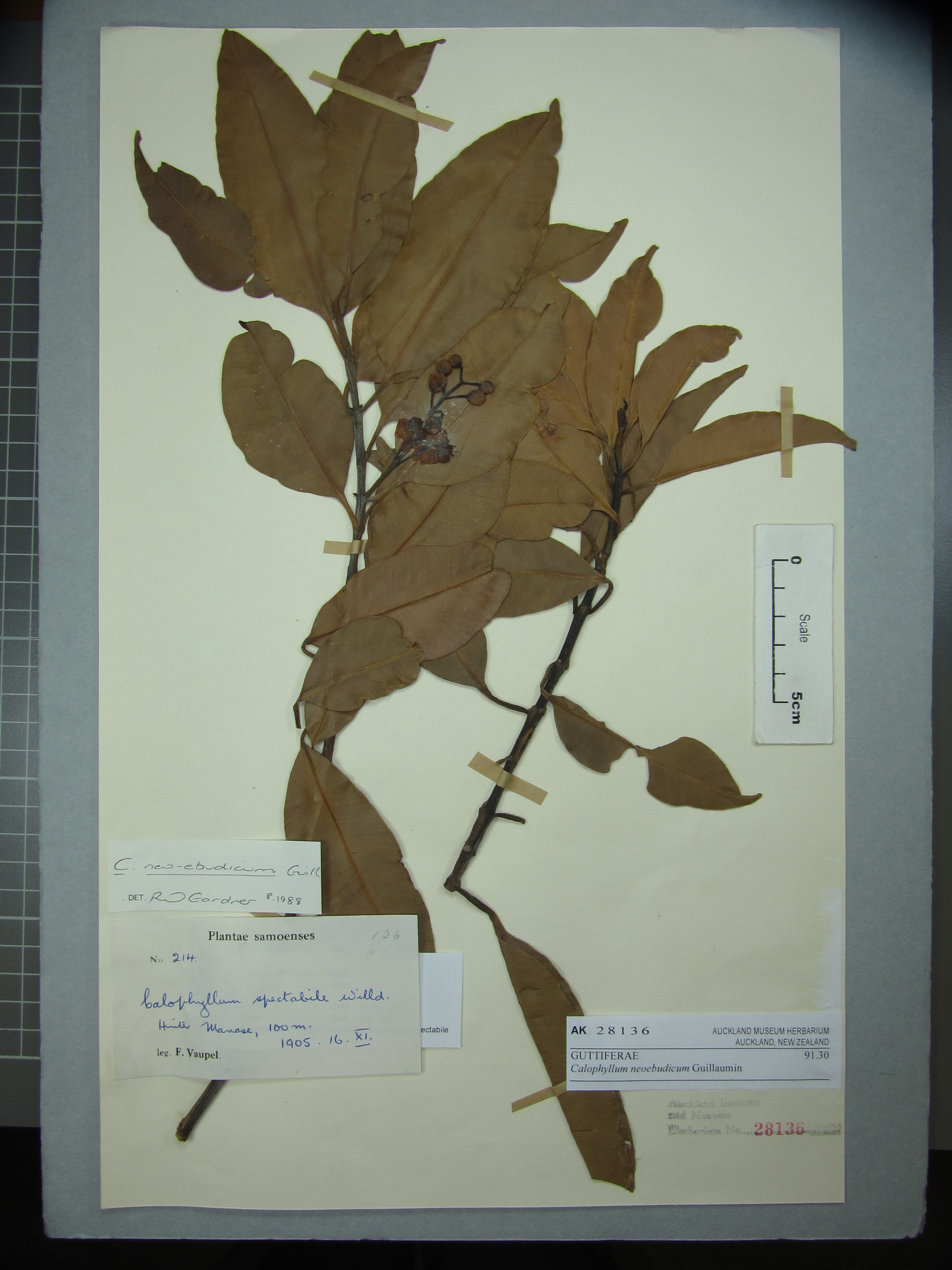
- 1905 specimen at Auckland War Memorial Museum

Conservation status
- Least Concern (IUCN 3.1)

Scientific classification
- Kingdom: Plantae
- Clade: Embryophytes
- Clade: Tracheophytes
- Clade: Angiosperms
- Clade: Eudicots
- Clade: Rosids
- Order: Malpighiales
- Family: Calophyllaceae
- Genus: Calophyllum
- Species: C. neoebudicum

Binomial name
- Calophyllum neoebudicum Guillaumin

Synonyms
- Calophyllum pseudovitiense P.F.Stevens; Calophyllum samoense Christoph.

= Calophyllum neoebudicum =

Species of tree

Calophyllum neoebudicum is a species of tree in the Calophyllaceae family. It is found in American Samoa, Fiji, Indonesia (Sulawesi), Niue, Papua New Guinea (the Bismarck Archipelago), Samoa, the Santa Cruz Islands, the Solomon Islands, Tonga, Vanuatu, and Wallis and Futuna.

The species was described by André Guillaumin in 1931.
