= Calophyllum piluliferum =

Conservation status
- Critically Endangered (IUCN 3.1)

Scientific classification
- Kingdom: Plantae
- Clade: Tracheophytes
- Clade: Angiosperms
- Clade: Eudicots
- Clade: Rosids
- Order: Malpighiales
- Family: Calophyllaceae
- Genus: Calophyllum
- Species: C. piluliferum

Binomial name
- Calophyllum piluliferum P.F.Stevens

Species of flowering plant

Calophyllum piluliferum is a species of flowering plant in the Calophyllaceae family. It a tree which grows up to 18 metres tall, and is native to Papua New Guinea's Western Province in south-central New Guinea. It grows in lowland rain forest and freshwater swamp forest edges below 40 metres elevation.

The species was described by Peter F. Stevens in 1974. It is from an area which has had little botanical collection, and its population size and trend are not known. Forests in the region are threatened by logging, mining, and expansion of settlements. The IUCN Red List assesses the species as Critically Endangered.
