= Calophyllum insularum =

Conservation status
- Endangered (IUCN 2.3)

Scientific classification
- Kingdom: Plantae
- Clade: Tracheophytes
- Clade: Angiosperms
- Clade: Eudicots
- Clade: Rosids
- Order: Malpighiales
- Family: Calophyllaceae
- Genus: Calophyllum
- Species: C. insularum

Binomial name
- Calophyllum insularum P.F.Stevens

Species of flowering plant

Calophyllum insularum is a species of flowering plant in the Calophyllaceae family. It is a tree found only on the Cenderawasih Bay (Geelvink Bay) islands of western New Guinea, in Indonesia's West Papua region. It grows in lowland rain forest at about 200 metres elevation. It is threatened by habitat loss.

The species was first described by Peter F. Stevens in 1980.
