= Calophyllum confusum =

Conservation status
- Vulnerable (IUCN 2.3)

Scientific classification
- Kingdom: Plantae
- Clade: Tracheophytes
- Clade: Angiosperms
- Clade: Eudicots
- Clade: Rosids
- Order: Malpighiales
- Family: Calophyllaceae
- Genus: Calophyllum
- Species: C. confusum

Binomial name
- Calophyllum confusum P.F.Stevens

Species of flowering plant

Calophyllum confusum is a species of flowering plant in the Calophyllaceae family. It is found only in the Solomon Islands.
