= Calophyllum vexans =

Conservation status
- Least Concern (IUCN 2.3)

Scientific classification
- Kingdom: Plantae
- Clade: Tracheophytes
- Clade: Angiosperms
- Clade: Eudicots
- Clade: Rosids
- Order: Malpighiales
- Family: Calophyllaceae
- Genus: Calophyllum
- Species: C. vexans

Binomial name
- Calophyllum vexans P.F.Stevens

Species of tree

Calophyllum vexans is a species of flowering plant in the Calophyllaceae family. It is found in Indonesia (Maluku Islands and Western New Guinea) and Papua New Guinea (eastern New Guinea).
