= Calophyllum parvifolium =

Conservation status
- Vulnerable (IUCN 2.3)

Scientific classification
- Kingdom: Plantae
- Clade: Tracheophytes
- Clade: Angiosperms
- Clade: Eudicots
- Clade: Rosids
- Order: Malpighiales
- Family: Calophyllaceae
- Genus: Calophyllum
- Species: C. parvifolium

Binomial name
- Calophyllum parvifolium Choisy

Synonyms
- Calophyllum microphyllum Scheff. Calophyllum schefferi Vesque

Species of tree

Calophyllum parvifolium is a species of flowering plant in the Calophyllaceae family. It is native to Gebeh Island in the Maluku Islands and to Waigeo Island west of New Guinea in eastern Indonesia.
