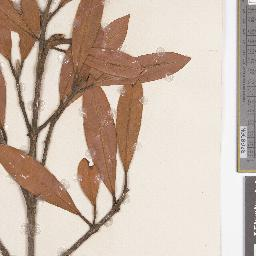
- Herbarium specimen from Kew Gardens

Conservation status
- Critically Endangered (IUCN 3.1)

Scientific classification
- Kingdom: Plantae
- Clade: Embryophytes
- Clade: Tracheophytes
- Clade: Spermatophytes
- Clade: Angiosperms
- Clade: Eudicots
- Clade: Rosids
- Order: Malpighiales
- Family: Calophyllaceae
- Genus: Calophyllum
- Species: C. acutiputamen

Binomial name
- Calophyllum acutiputamen P.F.Stevens

= Calophyllum acutiputamen =

Species of flowering plant

Calophyllum acutiputamen is a species of flowering plant in the Calophyllaceae family. It is found only on Rossel Island in the Louisiade Archipelago of Papua New Guinea. It is threatened by habitat loss.
