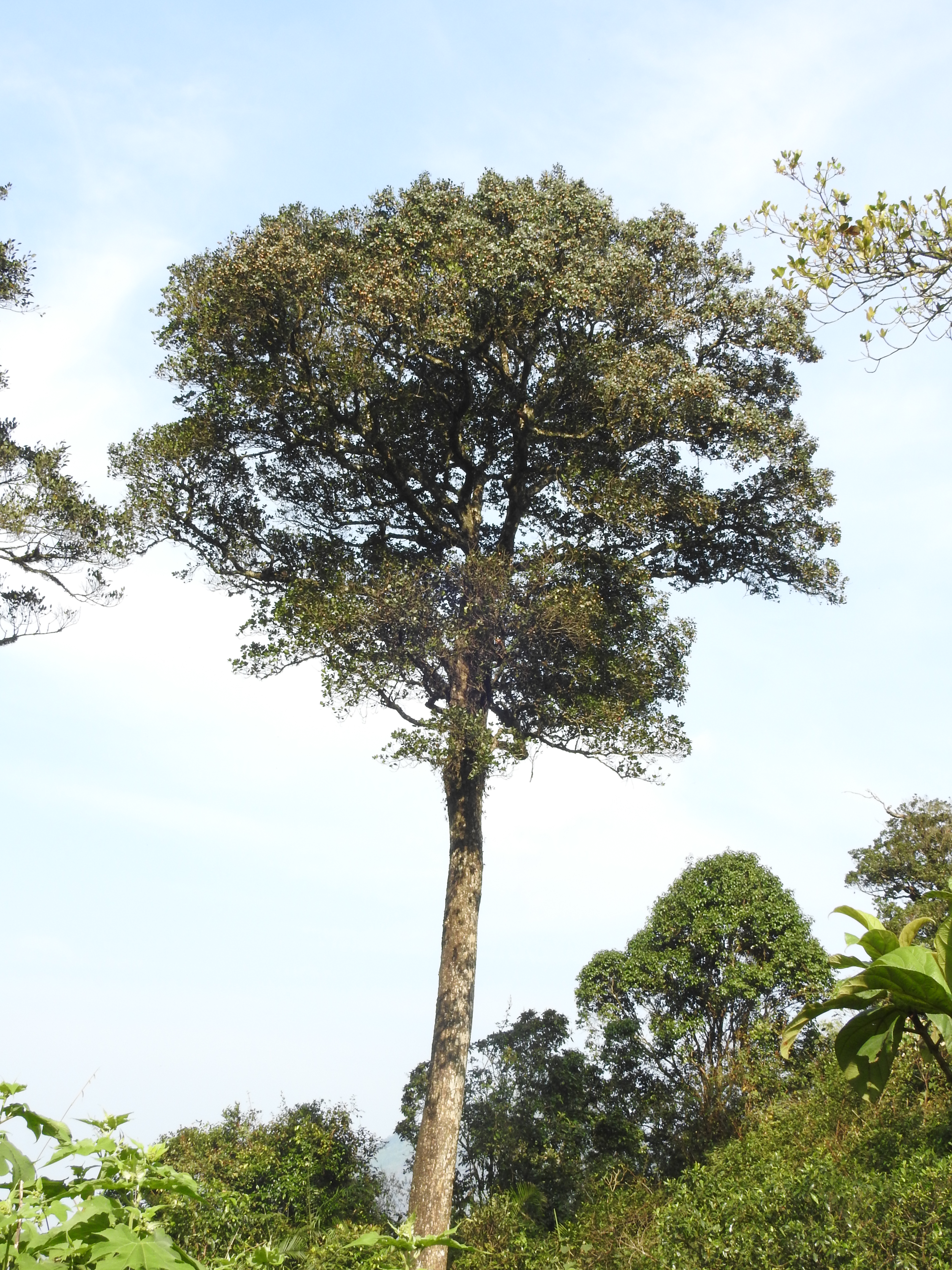
- Calophyllum austroindicum tree in the Anaimalai Hills

Conservation status
- Vulnerable (IUCN 3.1)

Scientific classification
- Kingdom: Plantae
- Clade: Embryophytes
- Clade: Tracheophytes
- Clade: Spermatophytes
- Clade: Angiosperms
- Clade: Eudicots
- Clade: Rosids
- Order: Malpighiales
- Family: Calophyllaceae
- Genus: Calophyllum
- Species: C. austroindicum

Binomial name
- Calophyllum austroindicum Kosterm. ex P.F.Stevens

= Calophyllum austroindicum =

Species of plant

Calophyllum austroindicum is a species of plant belonging to the genus Calophyllum of the family Calophyllaceae, commonly called the Cheru pinnai or kattupunna. This plant grows in the wet forests of the Western Ghats in India and is also found in the northern Andaman Islands.

== Gallery ==
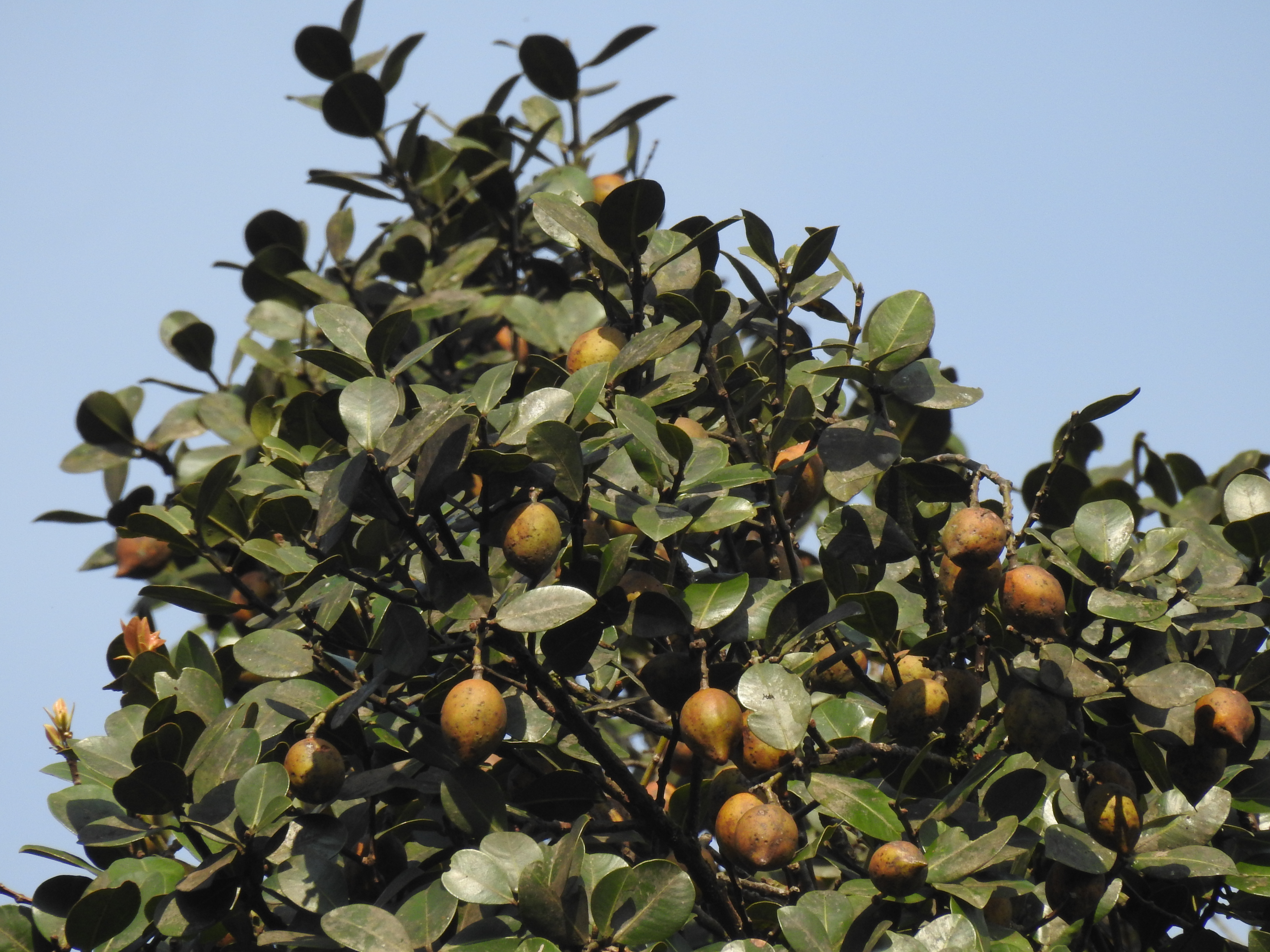
Fruiting branches

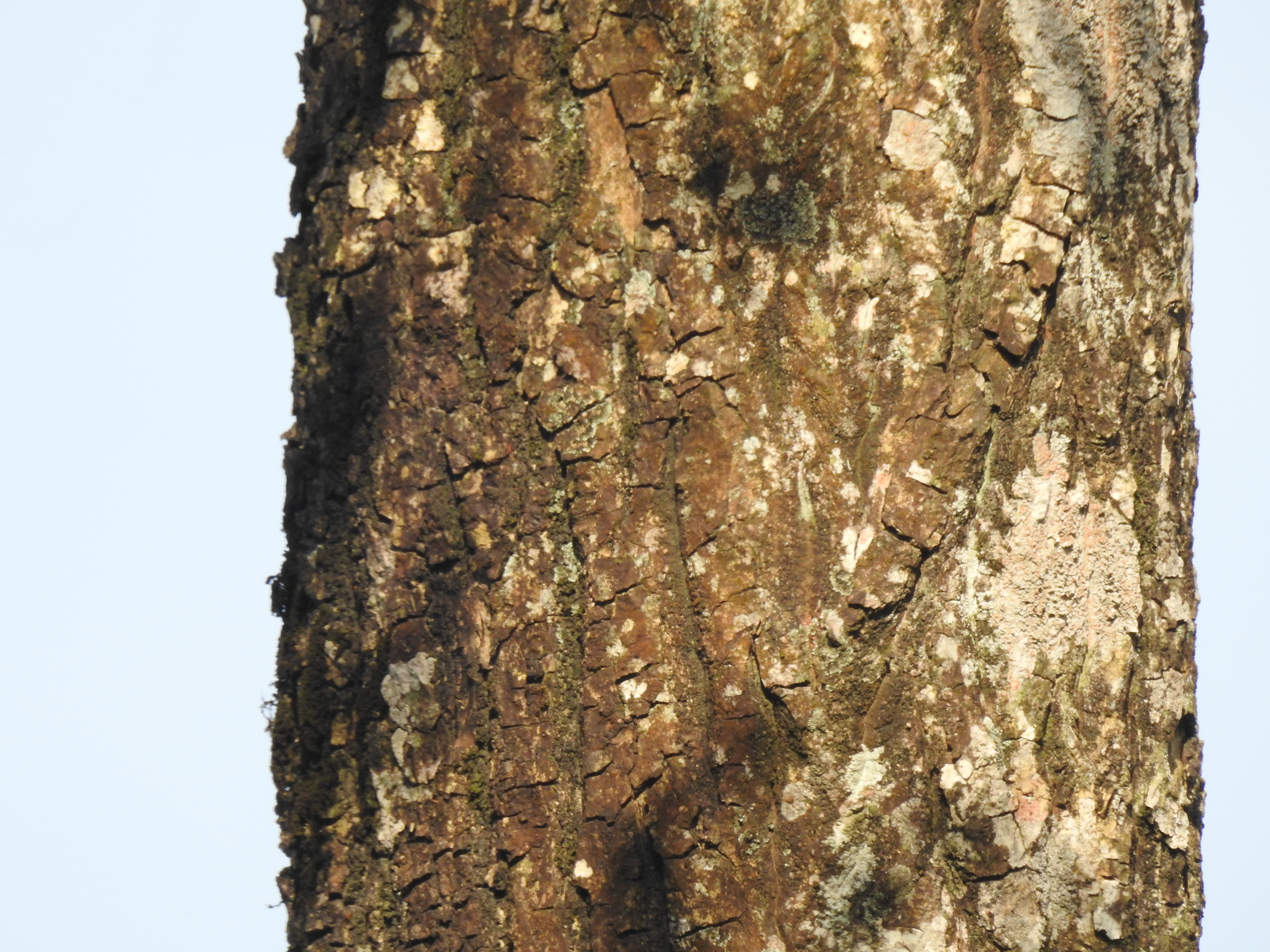
Tree bark

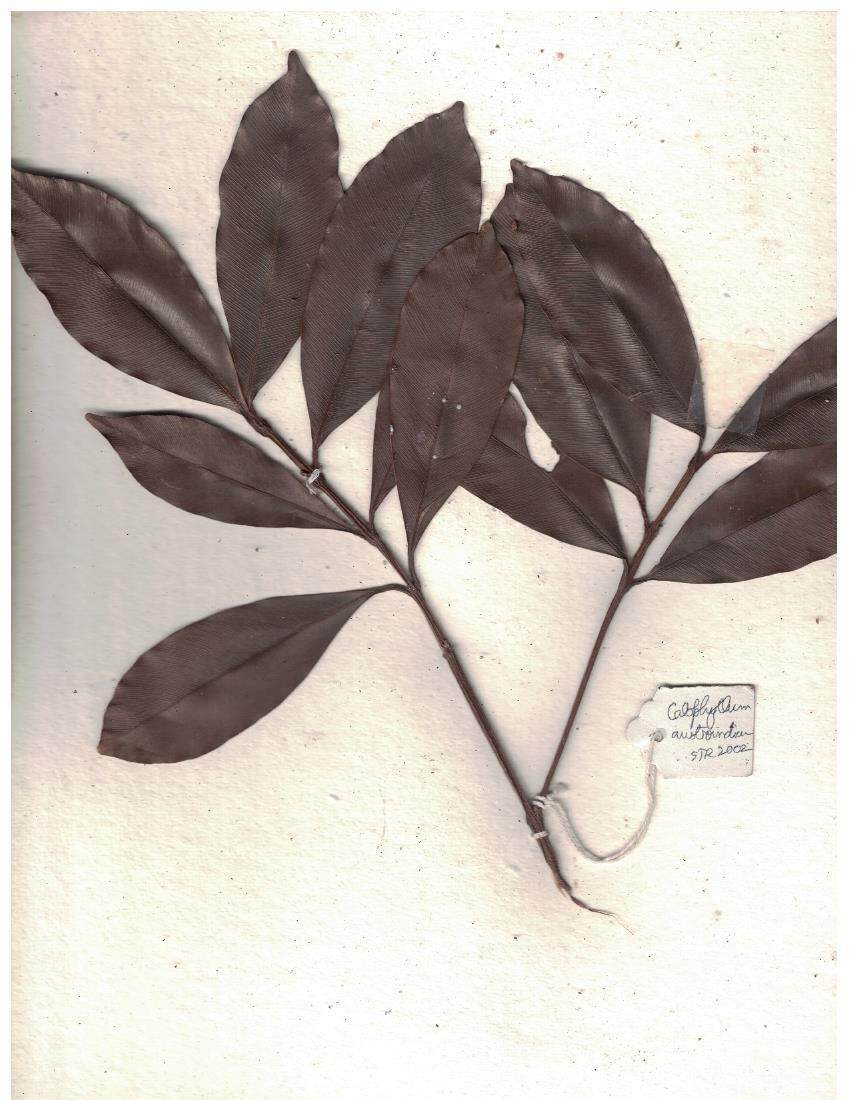
Herbarium

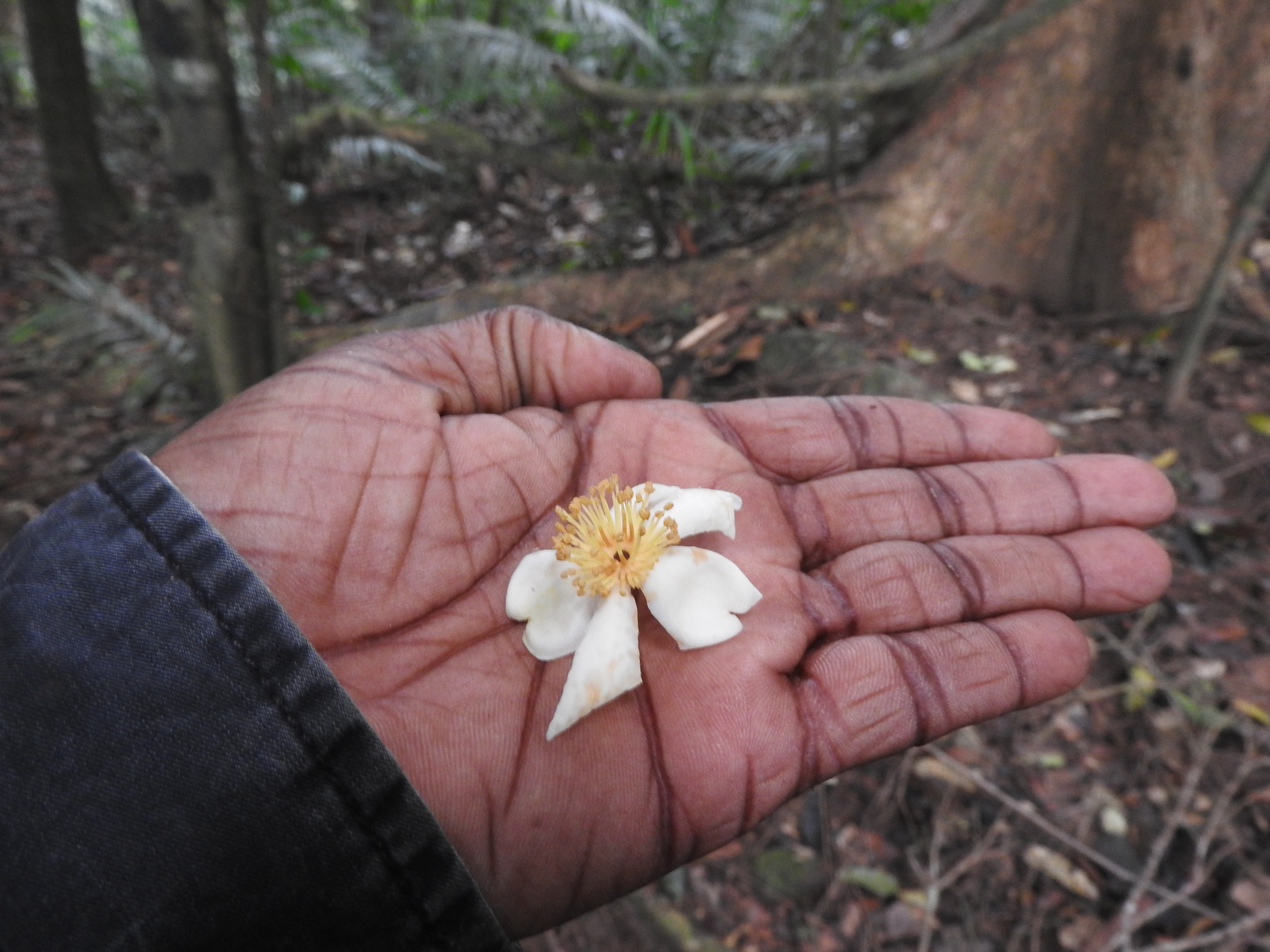
Flower
