= Calophyllum rufinerve =

Conservation status
- Vulnerable (IUCN 2.3)

Scientific classification
- Kingdom: Plantae
- Clade: Tracheophytes
- Clade: Angiosperms
- Clade: Eudicots
- Clade: Rosids
- Order: Malpighiales
- Family: Calophyllaceae
- Genus: Calophyllum
- Species: C. rufinerve

Binomial name
- Calophyllum rufinerve Kaneh. & Hatus.

Species of flowering plant

Calophyllum rufinerve is a species of flowering plant in the Calophyllaceae family. It a tree native to islands in Cenderawasih Bay in Western New Guinea region of Indonesia. It grows in Agathis rain forest at 400 metres elevation.
