= Calophyllum waliense =

Conservation status
- Endangered (IUCN 3.1)

Scientific classification
- Kingdom: Plantae
- Clade: Tracheophytes
- Clade: Angiosperms
- Clade: Eudicots
- Clade: Rosids
- Order: Malpighiales
- Family: Calophyllaceae
- Genus: Calophyllum
- Species: C. waliense

Binomial name
- Calophyllum waliense P.F.Stevens

Species of flowering plant

Calophyllum waliense is a species of flowering plant in the Calophyllaceae family. It is a tree endemic to Manus Island in the Admiralty Islands in Papua New Guinea. It grows in lowland rain forest up to 500 metres elevation. It is threatened by habitat loss.

The species was described by Peter F. Stevens in 1980.
