= Calophyllum robustum =

Conservation status
- Endangered (IUCN 3.1)

Scientific classification
- Kingdom: Plantae
- Clade: Tracheophytes
- Clade: Angiosperms
- Clade: Eudicots
- Clade: Rosids
- Order: Malpighiales
- Family: Calophyllaceae
- Genus: Calophyllum
- Species: C. robustum

Binomial name
- Calophyllum robustum P.F.Stevens

Species of flowering plant

Calophyllum robustum is a species of flowering plant in the Calophyllaceae family. It is a tree endemic to eastern New Guinea, where it is known from Morobe Province and near Ioma in Northern Province of Papua New Guinea. It is a large tree which grows 18 to 30 metres tall. It is native to lowland rain forest from 3 to 180 metres elevation. It is threatened by habitat loss.

The species was described by Peter F. Stevens in 1974.
