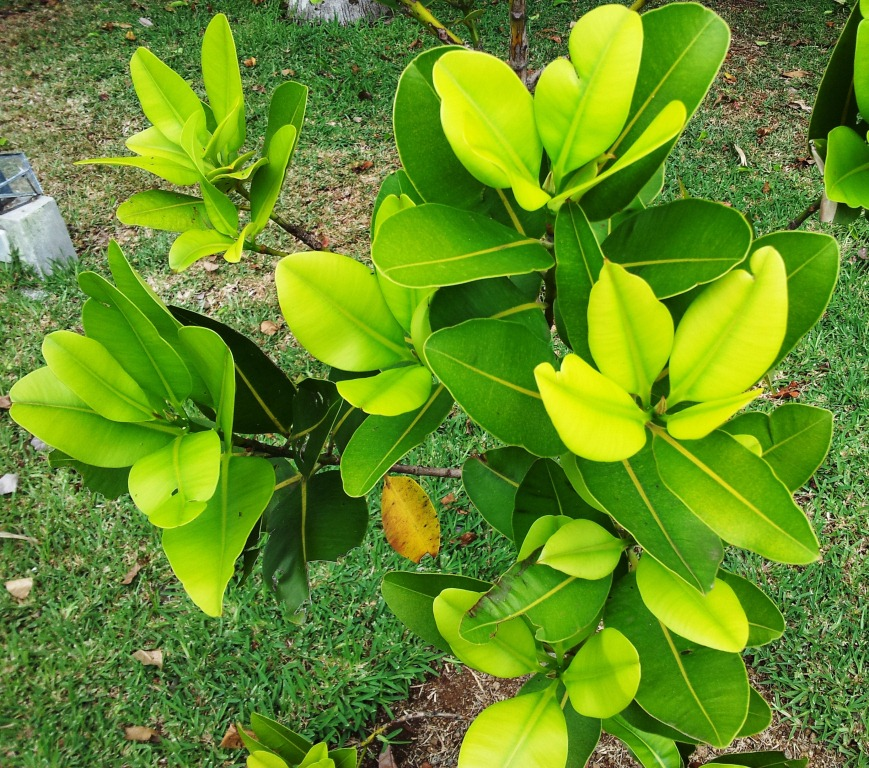

Scientific classification
- Kingdom: Plantae
- Clade: Embryophytes
- Clade: Tracheophytes
- Clade: Angiosperms
- Clade: Eudicots
- Clade: Rosids
- Order: Malpighiales
- Family: Calophyllaceae
- Genus: Calophyllum
- Species: C. tacamahaca

Binomial name
- Calophyllum tacamahaca Willd.

Synonyms
- Calophyllum lanceolarium Roxb.; Calophyllum lanceolatum Blume; Calophyllum spectabile Willd.

= Calophyllum tacamahaca =

Species of flowering plant

Calophyllum tacamahaca is a species of plant in the family Calophyllaceae. It is native to Mauritius and Réunion in the western Indian Ocean.
