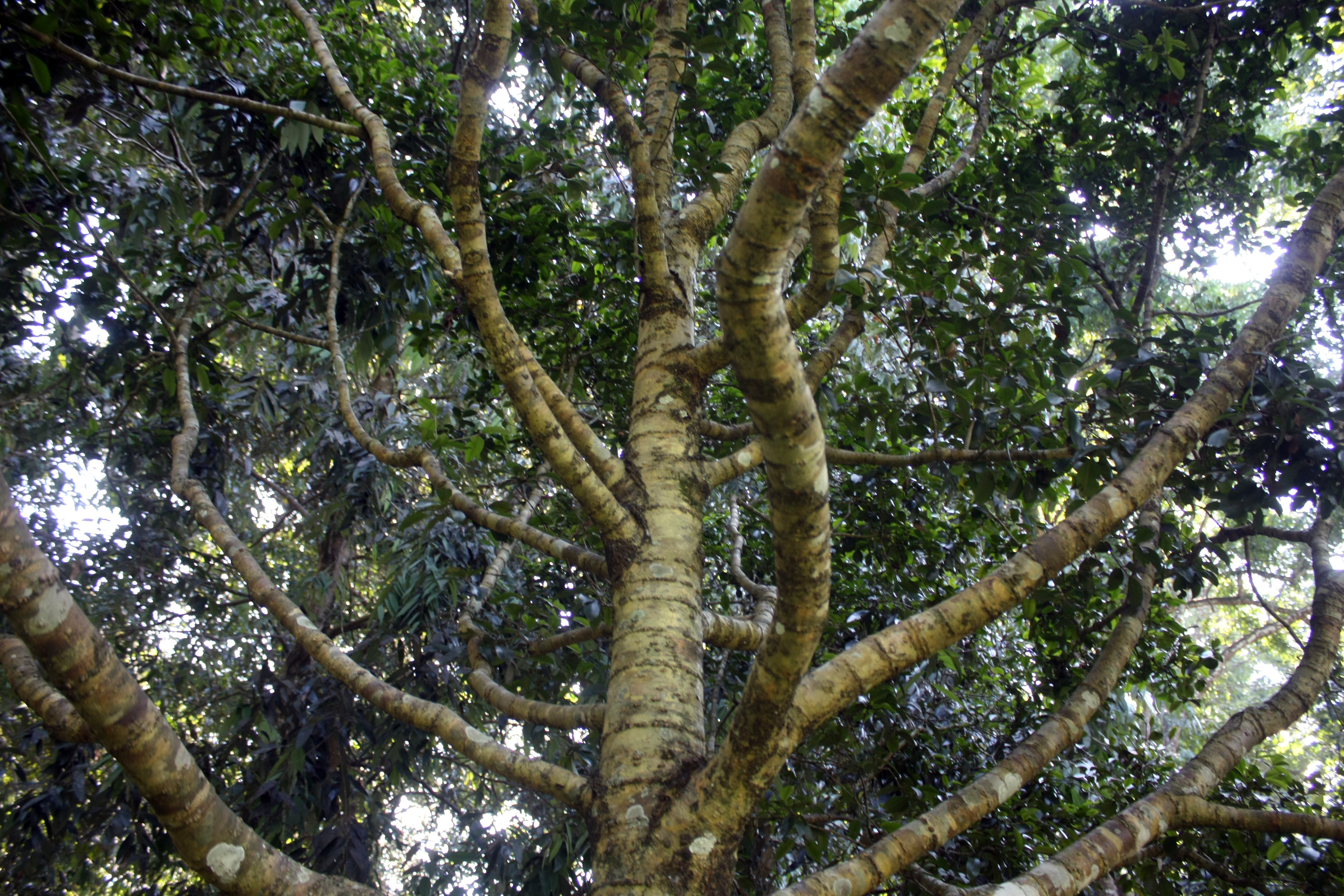

Scientific classification
- Kingdom: Plantae
- Clade: Tracheophytes
- Clade: Angiosperms
- Clade: Eudicots
- Clade: Rosids
- Order: Malpighiales
- Family: Calophyllaceae
- Genus: Calophyllum
- Species: C. calaba

Binomial name
- Calophyllum calaba L.

= Calophyllum calaba =

Species of plant

Calophyllum bracteatum is a species of flowering plant in the Calophyllaceae family. It is found in Sri Lanka where it is known as ගුරු කින (guru kina) by local people.

== Trunk ==
Bark - young smooth, mature rough, deeply fissured, lenticellate, bright yellow-orange; Immature Bark - beefy red; clear exudate.

== Uses ==
fruit - edible.
