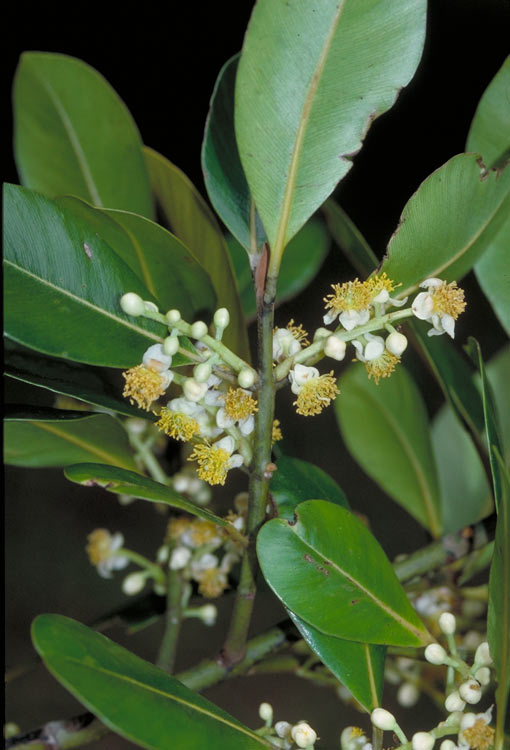
- Foliage with flowers

Conservation status
- Least Concern (IUCN 3.1)

Scientific classification
- Kingdom: Plantae
- Clade: Embryophytes
- Clade: Tracheophytes
- Clade: Spermatophytes
- Clade: Angiosperms
- Clade: Eudicots
- Clade: Rosids
- Order: Malpighiales
- Family: Calophyllaceae
- Genus: Calophyllum
- Species: C. sil

Binomial name
- Calophyllum sil Lauterb.

Synonyms
- Calophyllum procerum A.C.Sm.; Calophyllum ramiflorum O.Schwarz

= Calophyllum sil =

Species of tree

Calophyllum sil is a species of flowering plant in the Calophyllaceae family. It is a tree native to northern Australia (Queensland, the Northern Territory, and Western Australia), eastern Indonesia (the Maluku Islands), and Papua New Guinea (eastern New Guinea and the Bismarck Archipelago). It grows in lowland tropical rain forest and seasonally-dry tropical forest, tropical savanna woodland, riverine gallery forest, and secondary forest, generally below 200 metres elevation but occasionally up to 500 metres elevation.

The species was described by Carl Adolf Georg Lauterbach in 1922.
