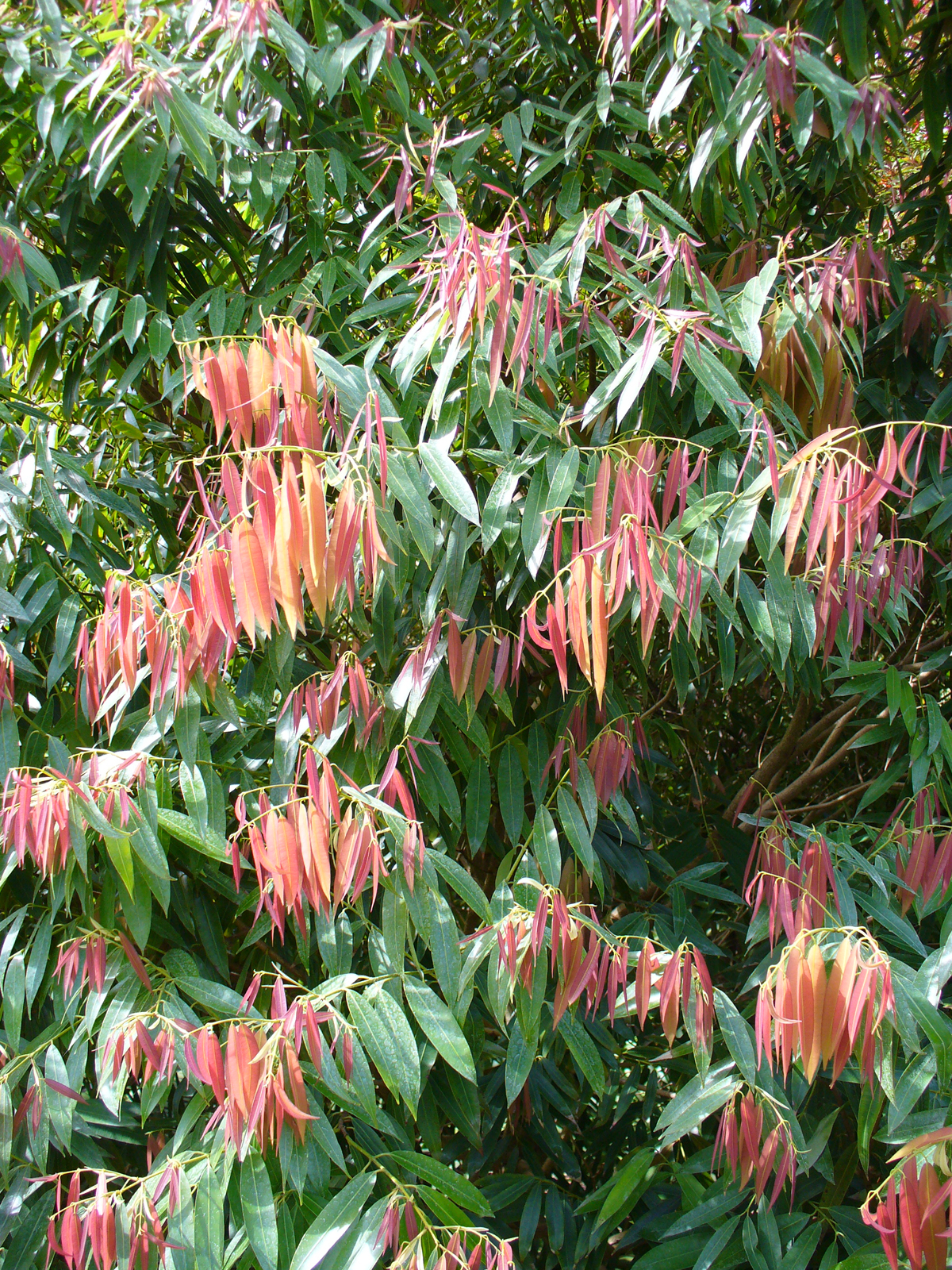
- Mesua ferrea foliage

Scientific classification
- Kingdom: Plantae
- Clade: Embryophytes
- Clade: Tracheophytes
- Clade: Angiosperms
- Clade: Eudicots
- Clade: Rosids
- Order: Malpighiales
- Family: Calophyllaceae
- Genus: Mesua; L.

Species
- See text

Synonyms
- Nagassari Adans.; Nagatampo Adans.; Plagiorrhiza Hallier f.; Plinia Blanco; Rhynea Scop.; Vidalia Fern.-Vill.

= Mesua =

Genus of flowering plants

Mesua is a genus of flowering plants in the family Calophyllaceae, native to tropical southern and southeast Asia. Common names include ironwood (shared with many other plants) and rose chestnut.

They are evergreen shrubs or small trees growing to 13 m (40 ft) tall, with leaves arranged in opposite pairs.

== Species ==
According to Plants of the World Online, 11 species are currently accepted:

- Mesua clemensiorum Kosterm. – Vietnam
- Mesua ferrea L. – India and Sri Lanka to Indochina, Peninsular Malaysia, Borneo, Java, and the Philippines
- Mesua kochummeniana Whitmore – Peninsular Malaysia
- Mesua nivenii Whitmore – Peninsular Malaysia
- Mesua nuda Kosterm. ex Whitmore – Peninsular Malaysia
- Mesua planigemma Kosterm. – Borneo
- Mesua pulchella Planch. & Triana – southwestern Sri Lanka
- Mesua purseglovei Whitmore – Peninsular Malaysia
- Mesua pustulata (Ridl.) P.S.Ashton – Borneo
- Mesua sclerophylla Thwaites – southern Sri Lanka
- Mesua thwaitesii Planch. & Triana – Sri Lanka and southwestern India

=== Formerly placed here ===
- Mesua daphnifolia (Ridl.) Kosterm., synonym of Kayea daphnifolia
- Mesua manii (King) Kosterm., synonym of Kayea manii
- Mesua nervosa (King) Kosterm., synonym of Kayea nervosa
- Mesua rosea (Ridl.) Kosterm., synonym of Kayea rosea
- Mesua stylosa (Thwaites) Kosterm., synonym of Kayea stylosa
- Mesua wrayi (King) Kosterm., synonym of Kayea wrayi
