= Mammee =

Mammee may refer to several New World tropical fruits or the trees which produce these fruits:

- Magnolia guatemalensis, in the family Magnoliaceae
- Mammea americana, in the family Calophyllaceae
- Pouteria sapota, in the family Sapotaceae

== See also ==
- African mammey apple, Mammea africana
