= Mammea immansueta =

Conservation status
- Least Concern (IUCN 3.1)

Scientific classification
- Kingdom: Plantae
- Clade: Tracheophytes
- Clade: Angiosperms
- Clade: Eudicots
- Clade: Rosids
- Order: Malpighiales
- Family: Calophyllaceae
- Genus: Mammea
- Species: M. immansueta

Binomial name
- Mammea immansueta D'Arcy

Species of flowering plant

Mammea immansueta is a species of flowering plant in the Calophyllaceae family. It is a tree found only in Panama. It is threatened by habitat loss.
