= Mammea veimauriensis =

Conservation status
- Endangered (IUCN 3.1)

Scientific classification
- Kingdom: Plantae
- Clade: Tracheophytes
- Clade: Angiosperms
- Clade: Eudicots
- Clade: Rosids
- Order: Malpighiales
- Family: Calophyllaceae
- Genus: Mammea
- Species: M. veimauriensis

Binomial name
- Mammea veimauriensis P.F.Stevens

Species of flowering plant

Mammea veimauriensis is a species of flowering plant in the Calophyllaceae family. It is a tree found only in the Papuan Peninsula of eastern New Guinea in Papua New Guinea.
