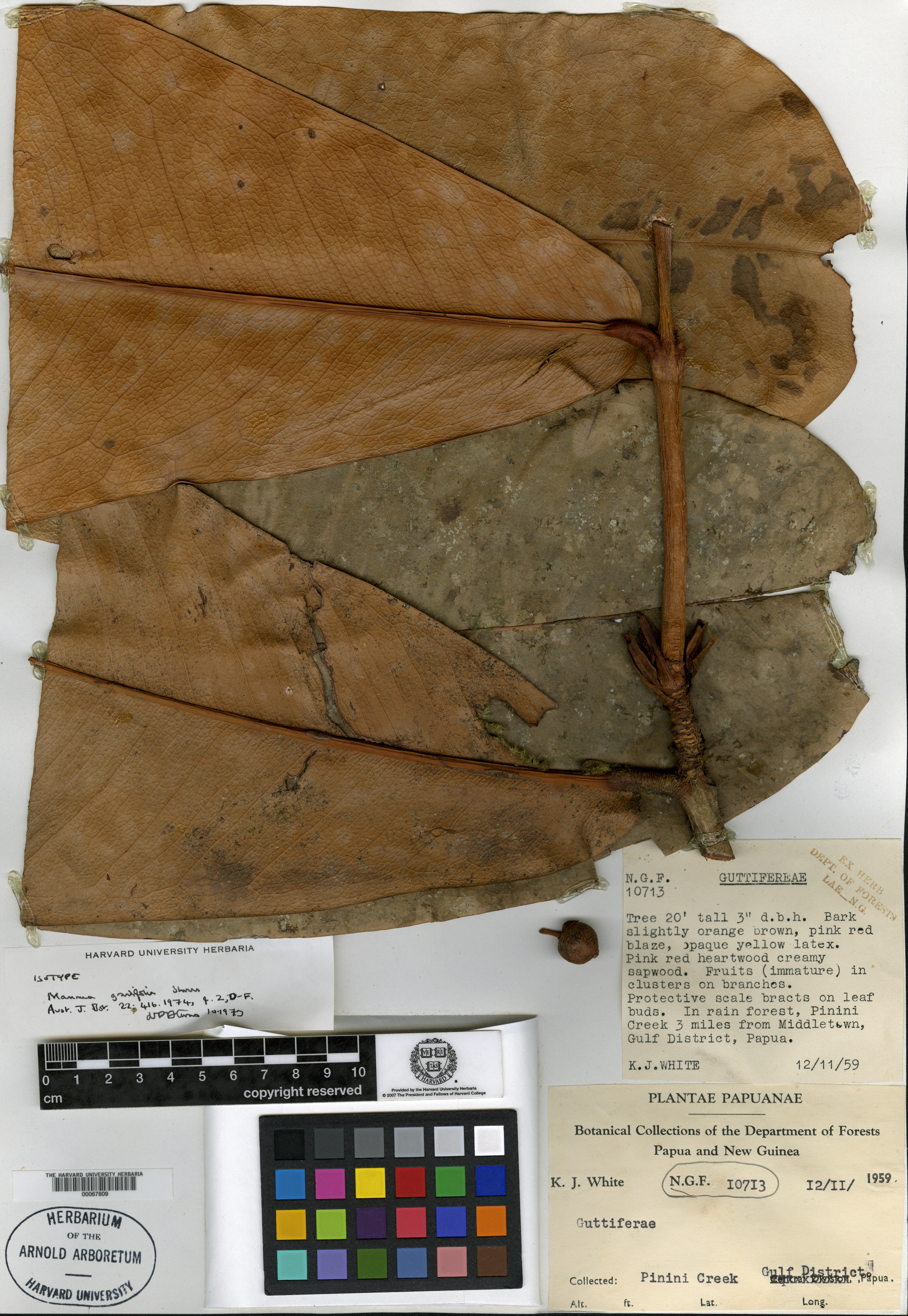
- Herbarium specimen

Conservation status
- Endangered (IUCN 3.1)

Scientific classification
- Kingdom: Plantae
- Clade: Tracheophytes
- Clade: Angiosperms
- Clade: Eudicots
- Clade: Rosids
- Order: Malpighiales
- Family: Calophyllaceae
- Genus: Mammea
- Species: M. grandifolia

Binomial name
- Mammea grandifolia P.F.Stevens

= Mammea grandifolia =

Species of flowering plant

Mammea grandifolia is a species of flowering plant in the Calophyllaceae family. It is a shrub or tree native to Gulf Province of Papua New Guinea in eastern New Guinea. It grows in lowland rain forest from 500 to 600 metres elevation.

The species was described by Peter F. Stevens in 1974.
