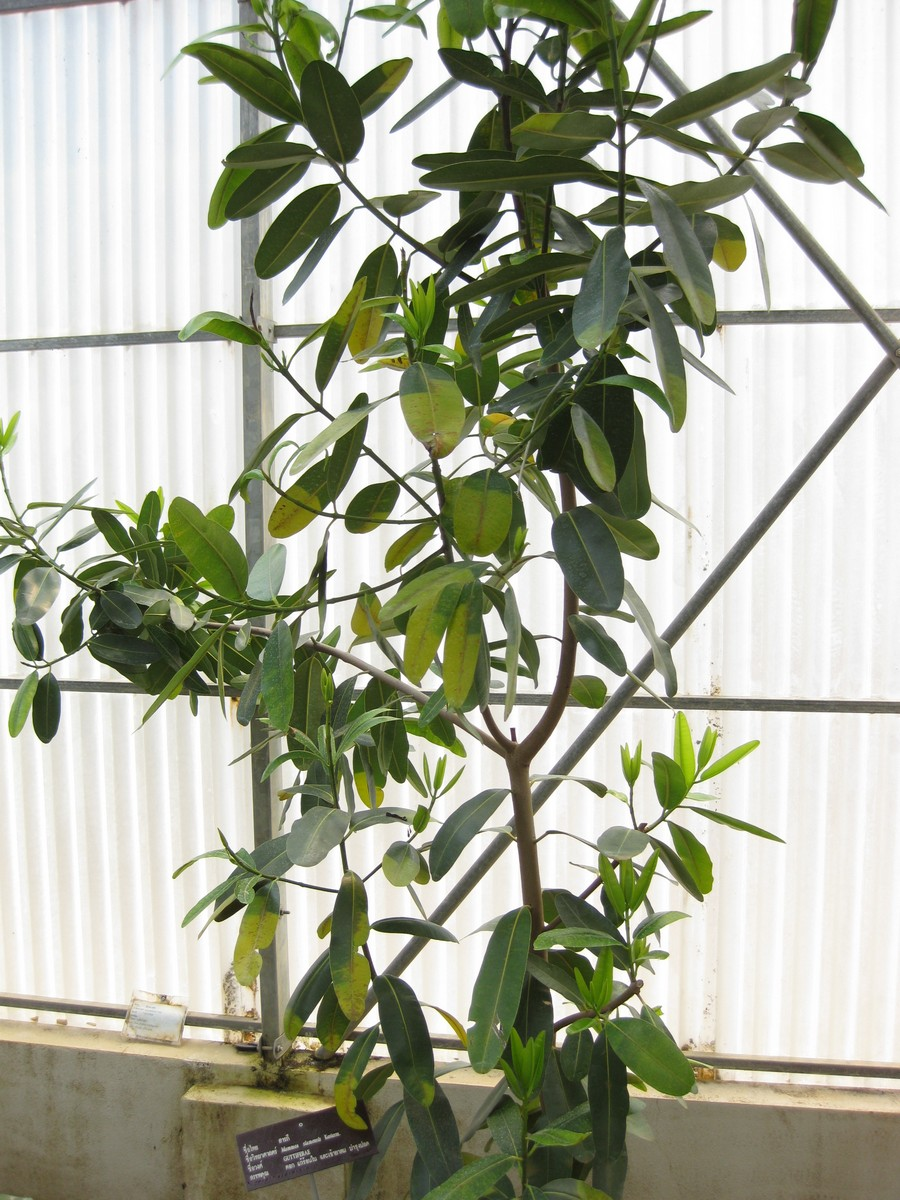

Conservation status
- Least Concern (IUCN 3.1)

Scientific classification
- Kingdom: Plantae
- Clade: Embryophytes
- Clade: Tracheophytes
- Clade: Angiosperms
- Clade: Eudicots
- Clade: Rosids
- Order: Malpighiales
- Family: Calophyllaceae
- Genus: Mammea
- Species: M. siamensis

Binomial name
- Mammea siamensis (Miq.) T.Anderson

Synonyms
- Calysaccion siamense Miq.; Mammea birmannica T.Anderson; Ochrocarpos siamensis (Miq.) T.Anderson; Ochrocarpos siamensis var. odoratissimus Pierre

= Mammea siamensis =

Species of tree

Mammea siamensis (Thai: สารภี, saraphi, สร้อยภี soiphi in Southern Thai) is a species of flowering plant in the Calophyllaceae family. Its name in Vietnamese is Trau tráu, and it is called "salapee" in Thailand and Laos. It is a tree native to Indochina (Cambodia, Laos, Myanmar, Thailand, and Vietnam) and Peninsular Malaysia (Penang). It is a small evergreen tree which grows 5 to 15 metres tall. It has fragrant yellow or white flowers and a small oval fruit. It grows in lowland and montane tropical moist forests from 10 to 1,300 metres elevation.

The species was first described as Calysaccion siamense by Friedrich Anton Wilhelm Miquel in 1863. In 1867 Thomas Anderson placed the species in genus Mammea as M. siamensis.
