= Mammea usambarensis =

Conservation status
- Endangered (IUCN 3.1)

Scientific classification
- Kingdom: Plantae
- Clade: Tracheophytes
- Clade: Angiosperms
- Clade: Eudicots
- Clade: Rosids
- Order: Malpighiales
- Family: Calophyllaceae
- Genus: Mammea
- Species: M. usambarensis

Binomial name
- Mammea usambarensis Verdc.

Species of flowering plant

Mammea usambarensis is a species of flowering plant in the Calophyllaceae family. It is found only in Tanzania.
