= Mesua kochummeniana =

Conservation status
- Vulnerable (IUCN 2.3)

Scientific classification
- Kingdom: Plantae
- Clade: Tracheophytes
- Clade: Angiosperms
- Clade: Eudicots
- Clade: Rosids
- Order: Malpighiales
- Family: Calophyllaceae
- Genus: Mesua
- Species: M. kochummeniana

Binomial name
- Mesua kochummeniana Whitmore

Species of flowering plant

Mesua kochummeniana is a species of flowering plant in the family Calophyllaceae. It is endemic to Peninsular Malaysia. It is threatened by habitat loss.
