= Mesua thwaitesii =

Scientific classification
- Kingdom: Plantae
- Clade: Tracheophytes
- Clade: Angiosperms
- Clade: Eudicots
- Clade: Rosids
- Order: Malpighiales
- Family: Calophyllaceae
- Genus: Mesua
- Species: M. thwaitesii

Binomial name
- Mesua thwaitesii Planch. & Triana

Species of flowering plant

Mesua thwaitesii, is a plant species in the family Calophyllaceae. It is native to Sri Lanka and southwestern India. The Sinhalese people of Sri Lanka call it "Diya Nā - දිය නා". The plant is highly valuable as a medicinal plant within the country.

== Chemistry ==
Timber, seeds and bark of Mesua thwaitesii is known to have Xanthones and 4-phenylcoumarins.

== Taxonomical controversy ==
Mesua ferrea is a complex species and has recently been split into several species and varieties. A.J.G.H. Kostermans and Gunatilleke et al. call the tree described in the Wikipedia article Mesua nagassarium. Kostermans lists several subspecies of Mesua nagassarium.

These authors list Mesua ferrea as a separate species that is endemic to Sri Lanka and is a small, 15 meters high tree that grows near streams and in marshes in the Southwest of Sri Lanka, where it is called "Diya Na" in Sinhala, meaning "Water Na Tree". This "Diya Na" is not cultivated. Gunatilleke et al. (p. 139), however, remark in a footnote: "In the most recent revision diya na is named as Mesua thwaitesii and na as Mesua ferrea".
