= Mammea novoguineensis =

Conservation status
- Near Threatened (IUCN 3.1)

Scientific classification
- Kingdom: Plantae
- Clade: Embryophytes
- Clade: Tracheophytes
- Clade: Spermatophytes
- Clade: Angiosperms
- Clade: Eudicots
- Clade: Rosids
- Order: Malpighiales
- Family: Calophyllaceae
- Genus: Mammea
- Species: M. novoguineensis

Binomial name
- Mammea novoguineensis (Kaneh. & Hatus.) Kosterm.

Synonyms
- Ochrocarpos novoguineensis Kaneh. & Hatus.

Species of flowering plant

Mammea novoguineensis is a species of flowering plant in the Calophyllaceae family. It is a tree endemic to New Guinea, including in West Papua (Indonesia) and Papua New Guinea. It grows in lowland rain forest.
