= Mammea malayana =

Conservation status
- Vulnerable (IUCN 2.3)

Scientific classification
- Kingdom: Plantae
- Clade: Tracheophytes
- Clade: Angiosperms
- Clade: Eudicots
- Clade: Rosids
- Order: Malpighiales
- Family: Calophyllaceae
- Genus: Mammea
- Species: M. malayana

Binomial name
- Mammea malayana Kosterm.

Species of tree

Mammea malayana is a species of flowering plant in the family Calophyllaceae. It is a tree endemic to Peninsular Malaysia. It is threatened by habitat loss.
