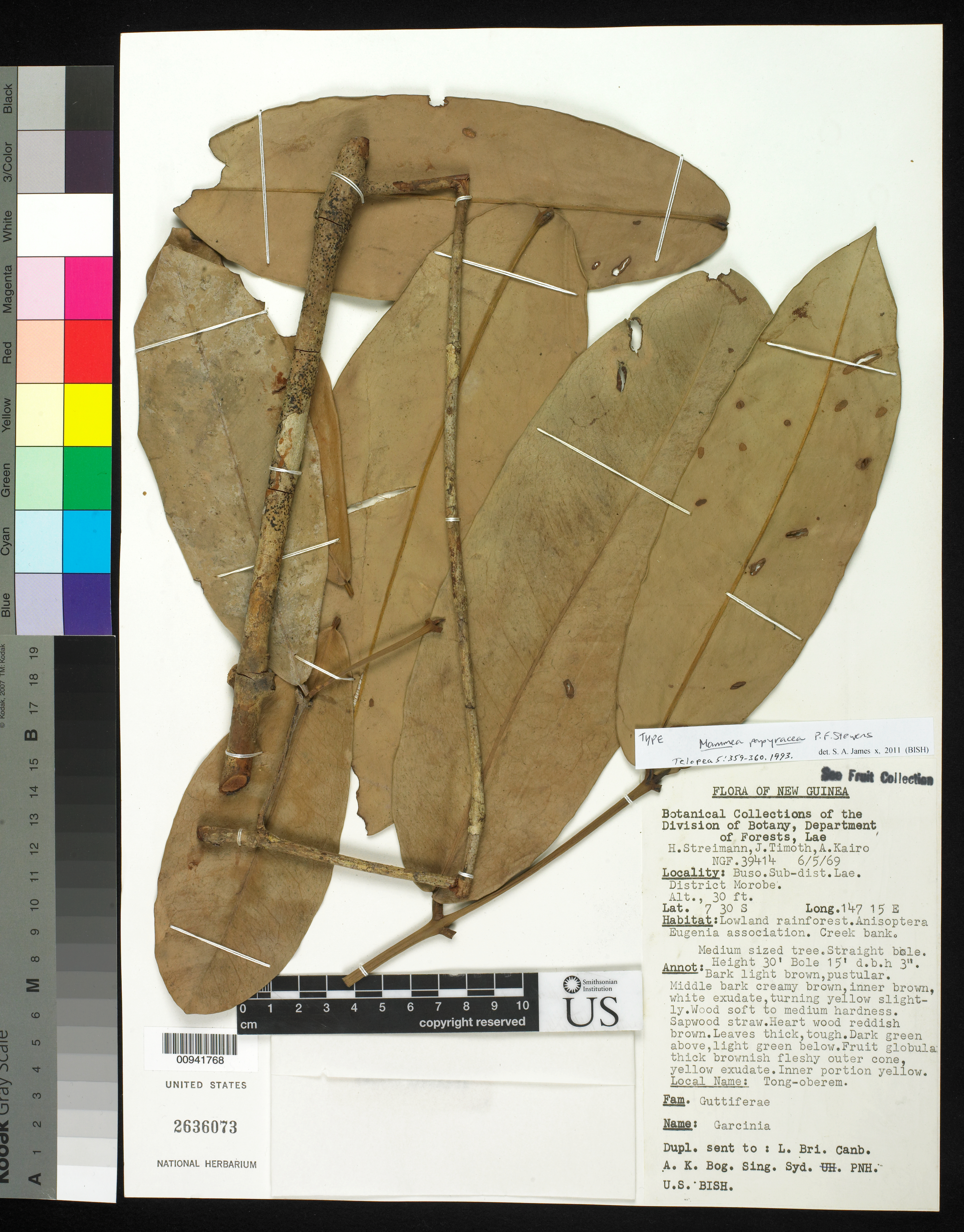

Conservation status
- Endangered (IUCN 3.1)

Scientific classification
- Kingdom: Plantae
- Clade: Tracheophytes
- Clade: Angiosperms
- Clade: Eudicots
- Clade: Rosids
- Order: Malpighiales
- Family: Calophyllaceae
- Genus: Mammea
- Species: M. papyracea

Binomial name
- Mammea papyracea P.F.Stevens

= Mammea papyracea =

Species of flowering plant

Mammea papyracea is a species of flowering plant in the Calophyllaceae family. It is known only from Kui in Morobe Province of Papua New Guinea in eastern New Guinea. It is a small tree which grows up to 9 metres tall. It grows in lowland rain forest from 200 to 400 metres elevation.

The species was described by Peter F. Stevens in 1993.
