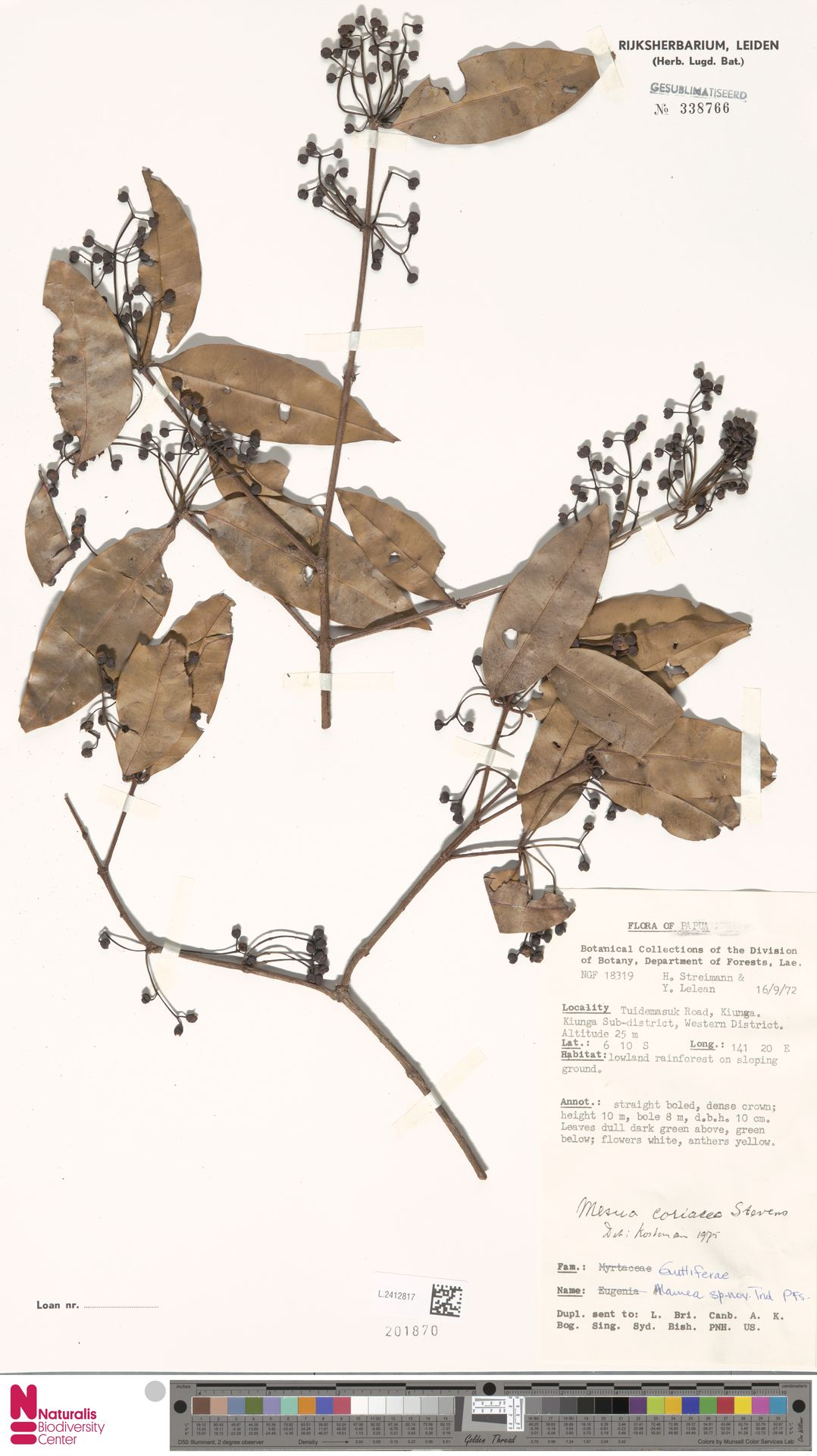

Conservation status
- Data Deficient (IUCN 3.1)

Scientific classification
- Kingdom: Plantae
- Clade: Embryophytes
- Clade: Tracheophytes
- Clade: Spermatophytes
- Clade: Angiosperms
- Clade: Eudicots
- Clade: Rosids
- Order: Malpighiales
- Family: Calophyllaceae
- Genus: Kayea
- Species: K. coriacea

Binomial name
- Kayea coriacea (P.F.Stevens) P.F.Stevens

Synonyms
- Mesua coriacea P.F.Stevens

= Kayea coriacea =

Species of flowering plant

Kayea coriacea is a species of flowering plant in the Calophyllaceae family. It is a tree endemic to Western Province of Papua New Guinea in central New Guinea. It grows in seasonally-flooded forests and on ridges in lowland rain forests.

The species was first described as Mesua coriacea by Peter F. Stevens in 1974. In 1993 Stevens placed the species in genus Kayea as K. coriacea.
