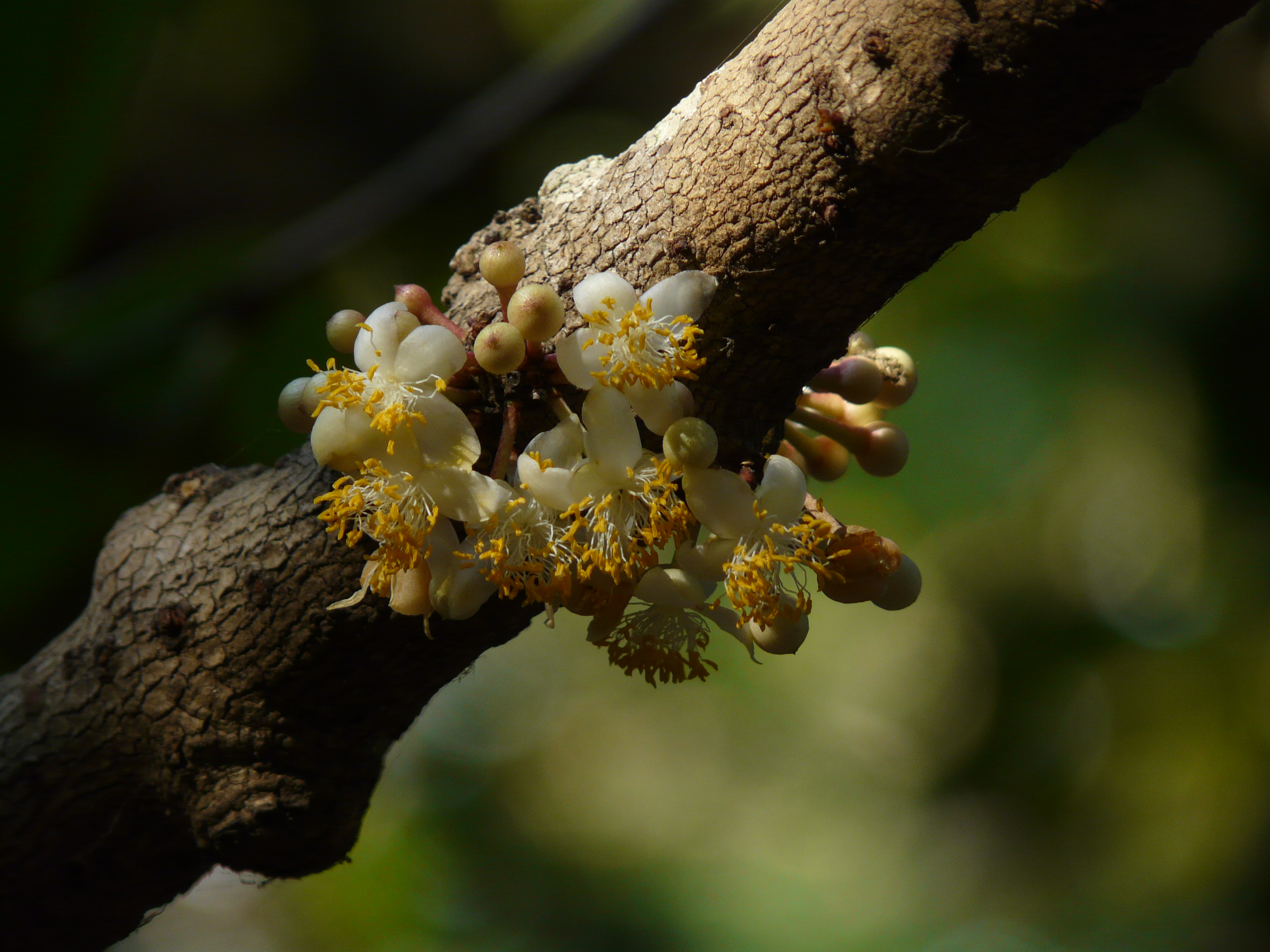

Conservation status
- Least Concern (IUCN 3.1)

Scientific classification
- Kingdom: Plantae
- Clade: Tracheophytes
- Clade: Angiosperms
- Clade: Eudicots
- Clade: Rosids
- Order: Malpighiales
- Family: Calophyllaceae
- Genus: Mammea
- Species: M. suriga

Binomial name
- Mammea suriga (Buch.-Ham. ex Roxb.) Kosterm.

Synonyms
- Calophyllum chinense T.Anderson; Calophyllum suriga Buch.-Ham. ex Roxb.; Calysaccion chinense Walp.; Calysaccion longifolium Wight; Mammea longifolia Planch. & Triana; Ochrocarpos longifolius Benth. & Hook.f. ex T.Anderson

= Mammea suriga =

Species of flowering plant

Mammea suriga is a species of flowering plant in the family Calophyllaceae. It is a medium-sized plant bearing fragrant white flowers. It is cultivated in Western Ghats for its flowers. Its leaves are simple and opposite. It is called Surige Mara in Kannada, Surnga in Kokani, Goa.

It is a coastal tree native to south India. A medium tall evergreen tree, the suriga bears small fleshy fruits. The outside of the fruit is green turns yellowish at ripening, surface smooth textured and inedible, covering sweet flesh juicy substance. Flowering starts from mid-February continues until mid-March. The nature of pollination is honey bee. After pollination, it takes 15 days to fruit set. After pollination, it takes 40-45 days for fruits to ripen..

The small yellow flowers emit a sweet smell and are turned into gajra, hair flower garlands, in Goa and regions of sindhudurg. The trees grow in the wild. Traditionally people collect the flowers from the forest trees to turn them into beautiful garlands. The flower garlands sold in local markets Its a high retunrn and high demand flower used for fregrance in perfumes.
