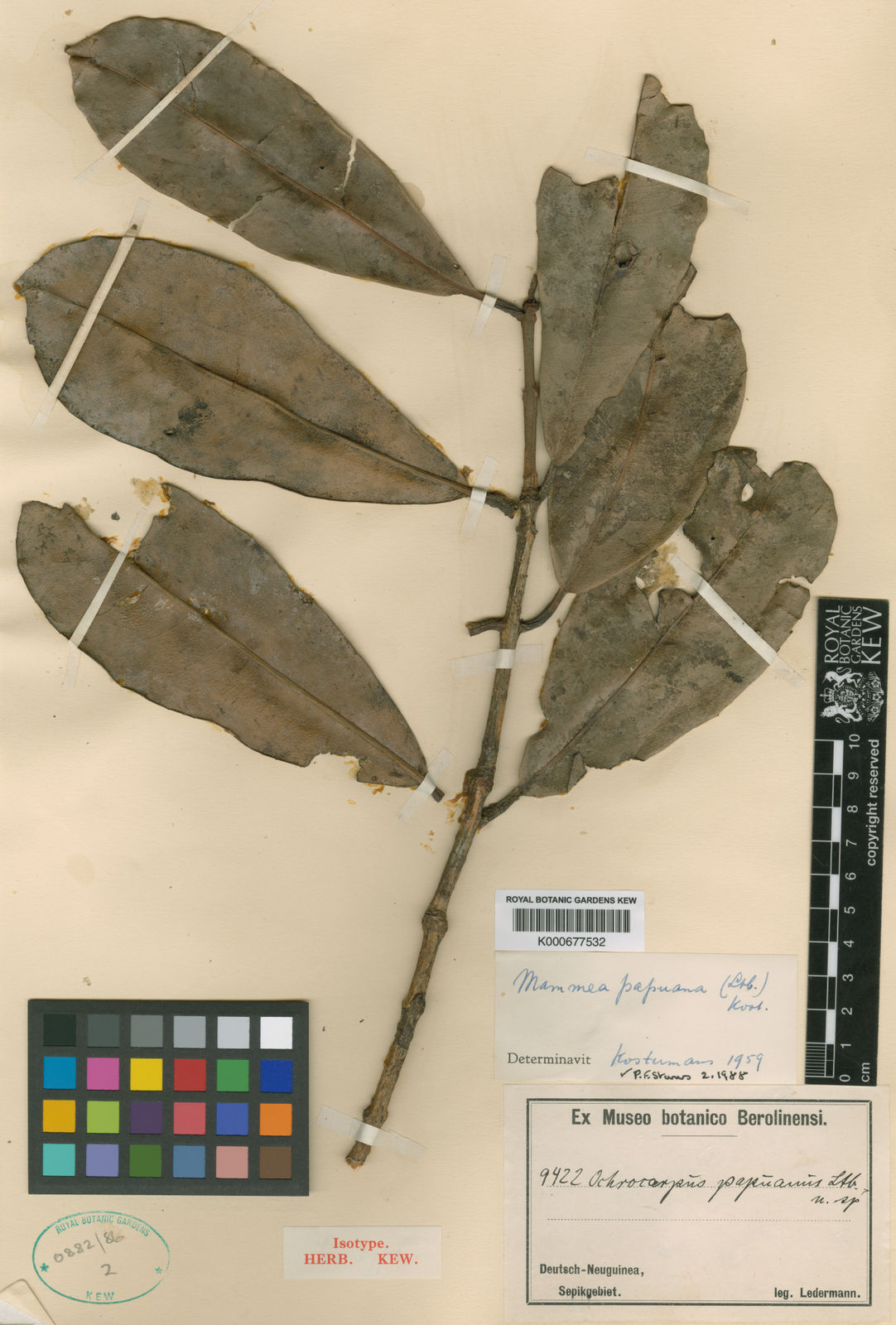

Conservation status
- Data Deficient (IUCN 3.1)

Scientific classification
- Kingdom: Plantae
- Clade: Embryophytes
- Clade: Tracheophytes
- Clade: Spermatophytes
- Clade: Angiosperms
- Clade: Eudicots
- Clade: Rosids
- Order: Malpighiales
- Family: Calophyllaceae
- Genus: Mammea
- Species: M. papuana

Binomial name
- Mammea papuana (Lauterb.) Kosterm.

Synonyms
- Ochrocarpos papuanus Lauterb.

= Mammea papuana =

Species of flowering plant

Mammea papuana is a species of flowering plant in the Calophyllaceae family. It is a shrub or tree native to East Sepik Province of Papua New Guinea in eastern New Guinea and to the Solomon Islands. It grows in lowland rain forest.

The species was first described as Ochrocarpos papuanus by Carl Adolf Georg Lauterbach in 1922. In 1956 André Joseph Guillaume Henri Kostermans placed the species in genus Mammea as M. papuana.
