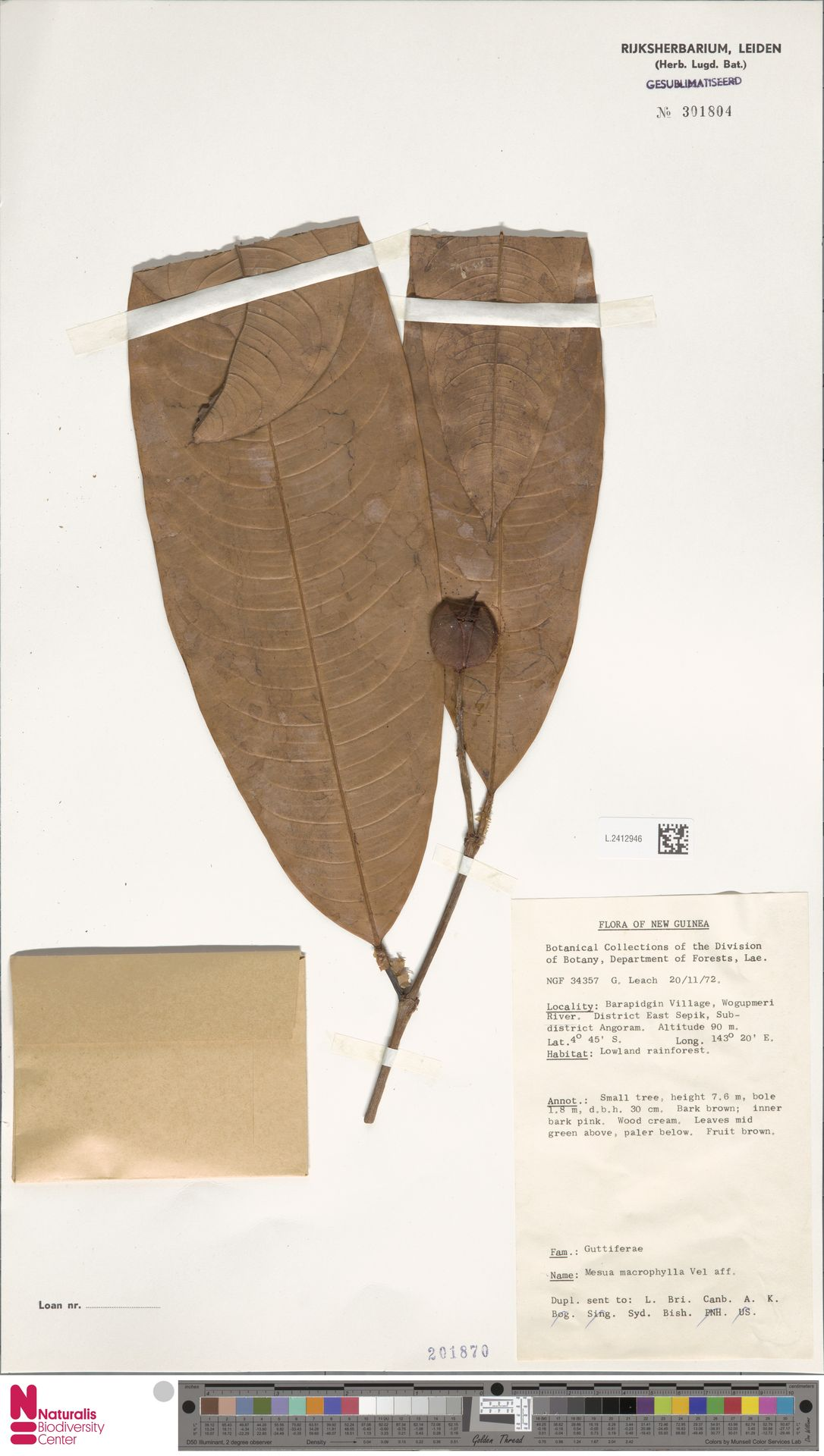

Conservation status
- Data Deficient (IUCN 3.1)

Scientific classification
- Kingdom: Plantae
- Clade: Tracheophytes
- Clade: Angiosperms
- Clade: Eudicots
- Clade: Rosids
- Order: Malpighiales
- Family: Calophyllaceae
- Genus: Kayea
- Species: K. macrophylla

Binomial name
- Kayea macrophylla Kaneh. & Hatus. (1942)

Synonyms
- Mesua macrophylla (Kaneh. & Hatus.) Kosterm. (1969)

= Kayea macrophylla =

Species of flowering plant

Kayea macrophylla is a species of flowering plant in the family Calophyllaceae. It is found in West Papua (Indonesia) and Papua New Guinea.
