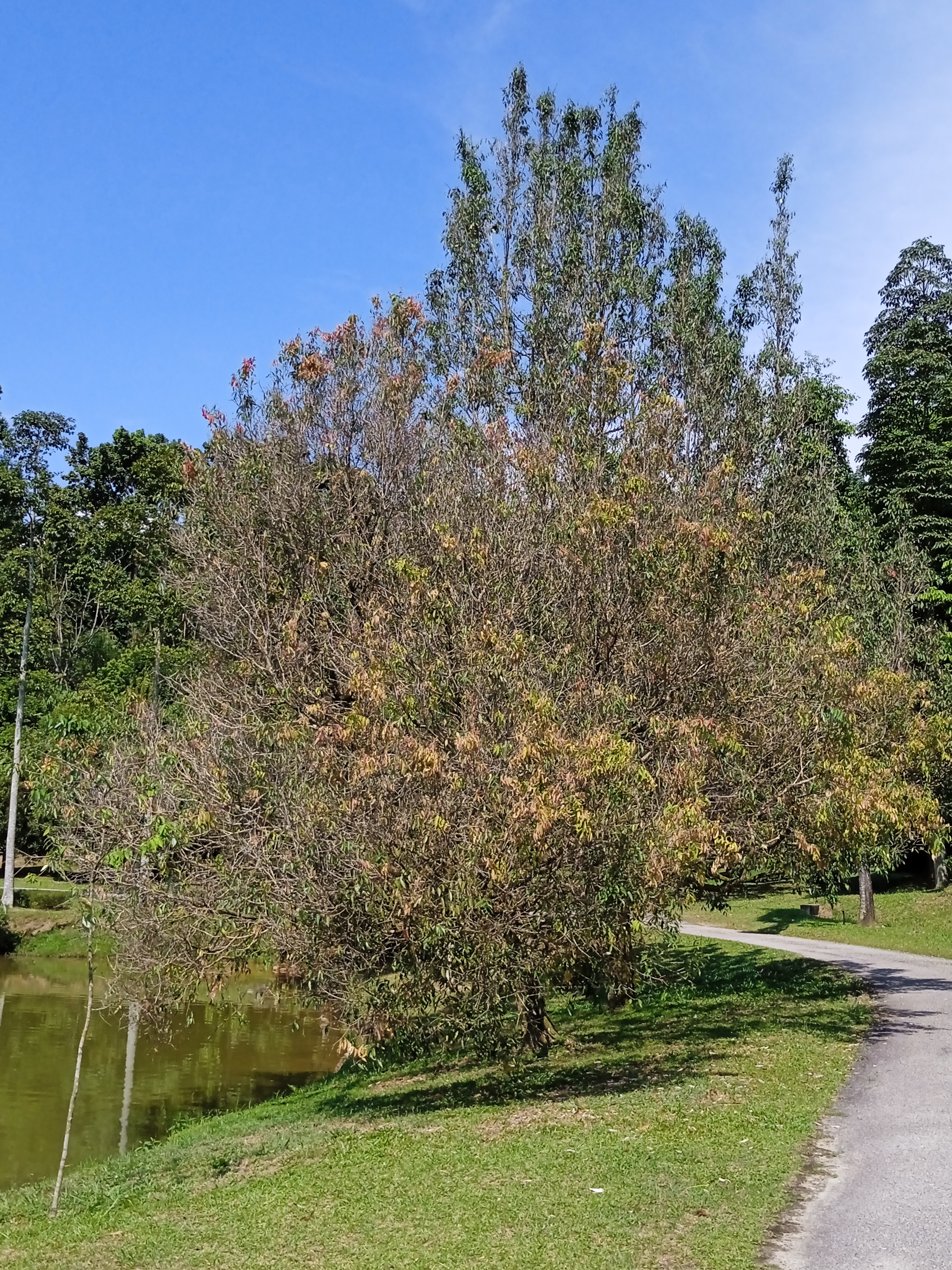
- Ceylon ironwood in Selangor, Malaysia.

Conservation status
- Vulnerable (IUCN 3.1)

Scientific classification
- Kingdom: Plantae
- Clade: Tracheophytes
- Clade: Angiosperms
- Clade: Eudicots
- Clade: Rosids
- Order: Malpighiales
- Family: Calophyllaceae
- Genus: Mesua
- Species: M. ferrea

Binomial name
- Mesua ferrea L.

Varieties
- Mesua ferrea var. coromandeliana (Wight) N.P.Singh; Mesua ferrea var. ferrea

Synonyms
- synonyms of var. coromandeliana: Mesua coromandeliana Wight; Mesua nagassarium var. coromandeliana (Wight) K.K.N.Nair; synonyms of var. ferrea: Calophyllum nagassarium Burm.f.; Mesua ferrea var. angustifolia Thwaites; Mesua ferrea var. thwaitesii Vesque; Mesua ferrea subsp. vera Vesque; Mesua nagana Gardner; Mesua nagassarium (Burm.f.) Kosterm.; Mesua nagassarium var. salicina (Planch. & Triana) Vesque; Mesua pedunculata Wight; Mesua roxburghii Wight; Mesua salicina Planch. & Triana; Mesua speciosa Choisy; Mesua walkeriana Planch. & Triana

= Mesua ferrea =

Ceylon ironwood

Species of tree

Mesua ferrea, the Ceylon ironwood, or cobra saffron, is a species in the family Calophyllaceae native to the Indomalayan realm. This slow-growing tree is named after the heaviness and hardness of its timber. It is widely cultivated as an ornamental for its graceful shape, grayish-green foliage with a striking pink to red flush of drooping young leaves, and its large, fragrant white flowers. It is the national tree of Sri Lanka, as well as the state tree of Mizoram and state flower of Tripura in India.

== Vernacular names ==
In the Indian subcontinent, Mesua ferrea is known by various vernacular names. In Hindi and Sanskrit, it is called Nagkesar (नागकेसर). In Tamil, it is known as Vagai (வாகை); in Telugu, Nagakesaramu (నాగకేశరము); in Kannada, Nagakesara (ನಾಗಕೇಸರ); in Malayalam, Naagappoo (നാഗപ്പൂ); in Bengali, Nagkeshar (নাগকেশর); in Assamese Nahor (নাহৰ).

== Taxonomy ==
The species was first published in Carl Linnaeus's book Species Plantarum on page 515 in 1753.

Mesua ferrea is a complex species and had been split into several species and varieties. A.J.G.H. Kostermans and Gunatilleke et al. call the tree described in this article Mesua nagassarium. Kostermans lists several subspecies of Mesua nagassarium.

These authors list Mesua ferrea as a separate species, that is endemic to Sri Lanka and is a small, 15 meters high tree that grows near streams and in marshes in the southwest of Sri Lanka, where it is called "Diya Na" in Sinhala, meaning "Water Na Tree". This "Diya Na" is not cultivated. Gunatilleke et al. (p. 139), however, remark in a footnote: "In the most recent revision diya na is named as Mesua thwaitesii and na as Mesua ferrea".

Kostermans and Gunatilleke et al. classify Mesua ferrea in the family Clusiaceae, while in the AgroForestryTree Database it is allocated to the Guttiferae. In Plants of the World Online and World Flora Online it is in the Calophyllaceae family.

=== Varieties ===
Two varieties are accepted.

- Mesua ferrea var. coromandeliana (Wight) N.P.Singh – southern India
- Mesua ferrea var. ferrea – Indian Subcontinent, Indochina, Peninsular Malaysia, Borneo, Java, and the Philippines.

== Description ==
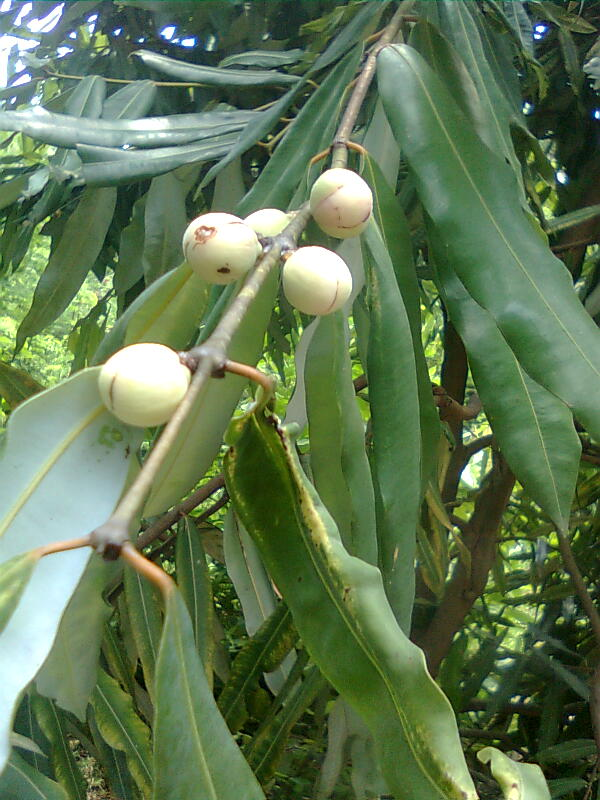

The tree can grow over 30 m (98 ft) tall, often buttressed at the base with a trunk up to 2 m (6 ft 7 in) in diameter. The bark of younger trees has an ash grey color with flaky peelings, while of old trees the bark is dark ash-grey with a red-brown blaze. It has simple, opposite, narrow, oblong to lanceolate, blue-grey to dark green leaves that are 7–15 cm (2.8–5.9 in) long and 1.5–3.5 cm (0.59–1.38 in) wide, with a whitish underside.The emerging young leaves are red to yellowish-pink and characteristically drooping. In contrast, mature leaves exhibit a dark-green adaxial surface, while the abaxial surface appears whitish due to a waxy coating. This wax layer contains nanoscale structures that render the surface water-repellent and hydrophobic, thereby helping to deter insect adhesion. The branches are slender, terete and glabrous. The bisexual flowers are 4–7.5 cm (1.6–3.0 in) in diameter, with four white petals and a center of numerous orange yellow stamens. The fruit is an ovoid to globose capsule with one to two seeds.

== Distribution and habitat ==
It is native to wet, tropical parts of Sri Lanka, India, southern Nepal, Burma, Thailand, Indochina, the Philippines, Malaysia and Sumatra, where it grows in evergreen forests, especially in river valleys. In the eastern Himalayas and Western Ghats in India it grows up to elevations of 1,500 m (4,900 ft), while in Sri Lanka up to 1,000 m (3,300 ft).

== In culture and heritage ==
=== History of the tree in Sri Lanka ===
In the dry zone of Sri Lanka, where ironwood trees normally do not grow wild, large, old ironwood trees can be seen around the remains of ancient Buddhist monasteries on rocky hills around Dambulla such as Na Uyana Aranya, Namal Uyana, Na-golla Aranya, Pidurangala near Sigiriya, Kaludiya Pokuna near Kandalama, and Ritigala. They are probably the descendants of trees planted as ornamentals in the monasteries in ancient times during the Anuradhapura period. Older trees form suckers or shoots from the base of the trunk, which become new trees when the old trunk falls down; therefore the bases and roots of some ironwood trees in these sites might be very old.

=== Buddhism ===
In Theravada Buddhism, this tree is said to have been the Bodhi tree, a tree under which a Buddha achieves enlightenment, of four past Buddhas: Mangala (මංගල), Sumana (සුමන), Revata (රේවත), and Sobhitha (සෝභිත).

Buddhists believe that the next Buddha Maitreya will also awaken under this tree. In Buddhist texts, it is often called nāgapuṣpa in Sanskrit and (龍華樹 lónghuā shù) in Chinese.

== Uses ==
As the English name indicates, the wood of this tree is very heavy, hard and strong. The density is 940 to 1,195 kg/m^{3} (59 to 75 lb/ft^{3}) at 15% moisture content. The colour is deep dark red. It is hard to saw and is mainly used for railroad ties and heavy structural timber.

In Sri Lanka the pillars of the 14th century Embekke Shrine near Kandy are made of iron tree wood.

The flowers, leaves, seeds and roots are used as herbal medicines in India, Malaysia, etc. and in nag champa incense sticks.

In the northeastern state of Assam, India, its seed oil was used daily for lighting in the evenings (while mustard oil was used for religious, health and culinary purposes) before the introduction of kerosene by the British.

== Gallery ==
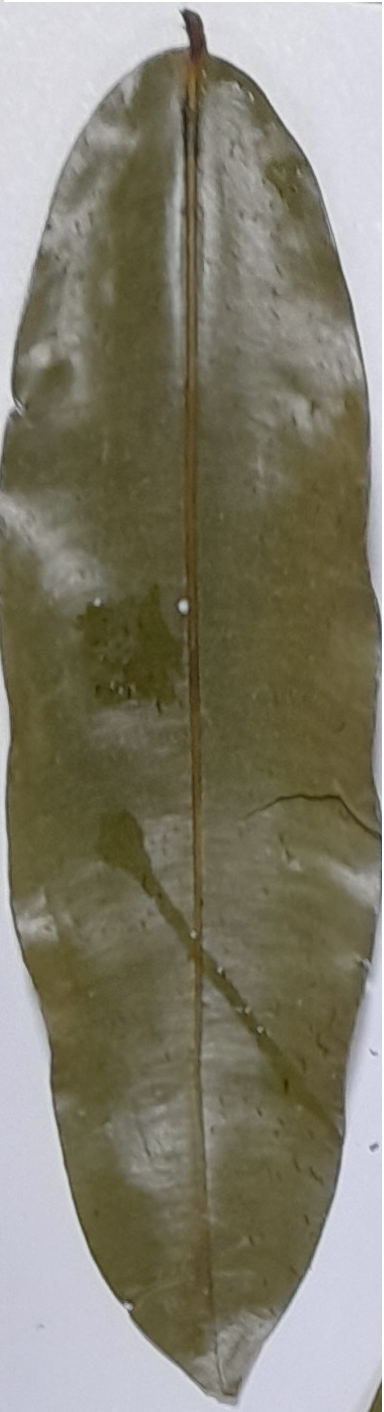

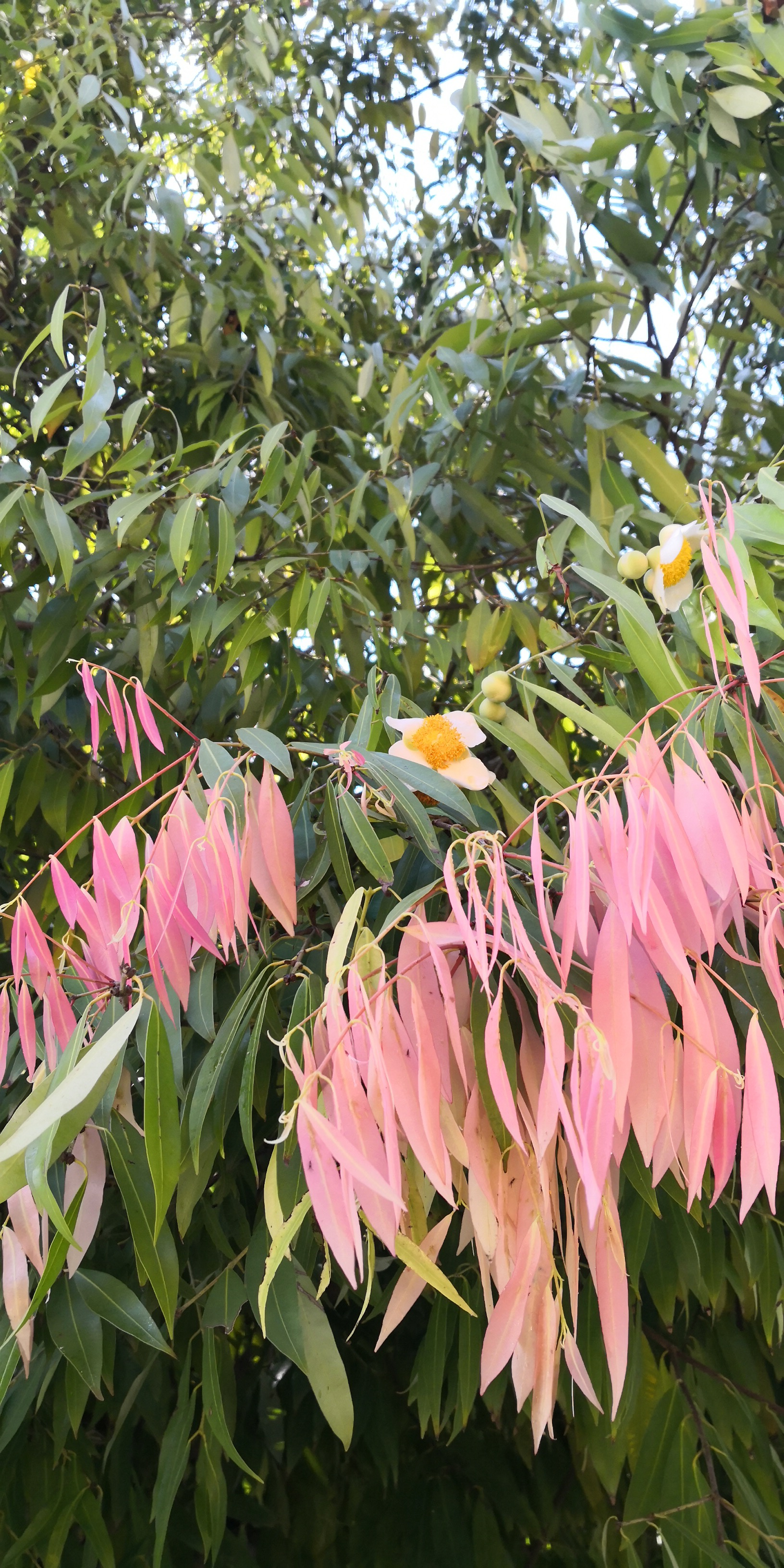
Young leaves and flowers

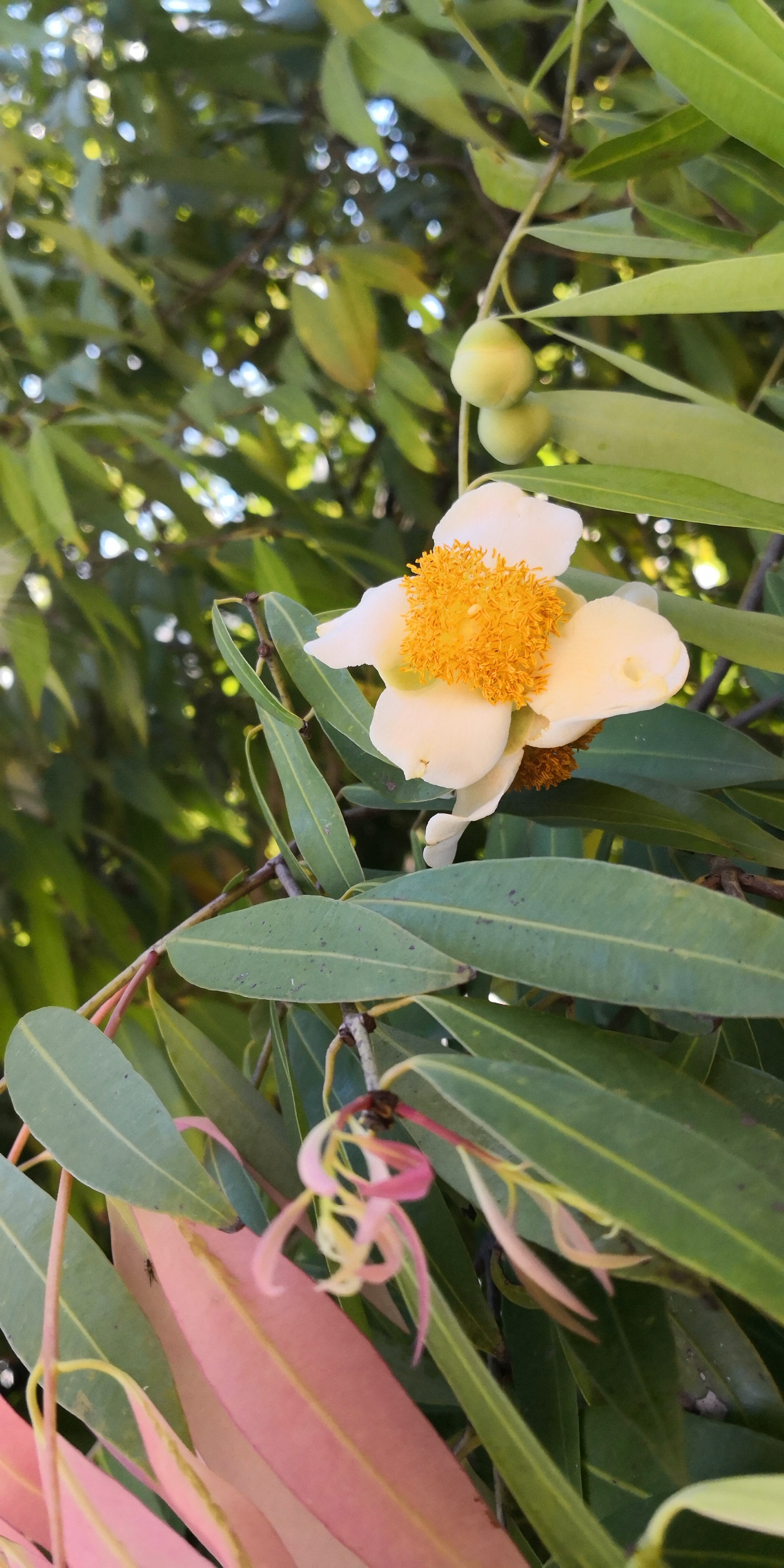
Young leaves and flowers

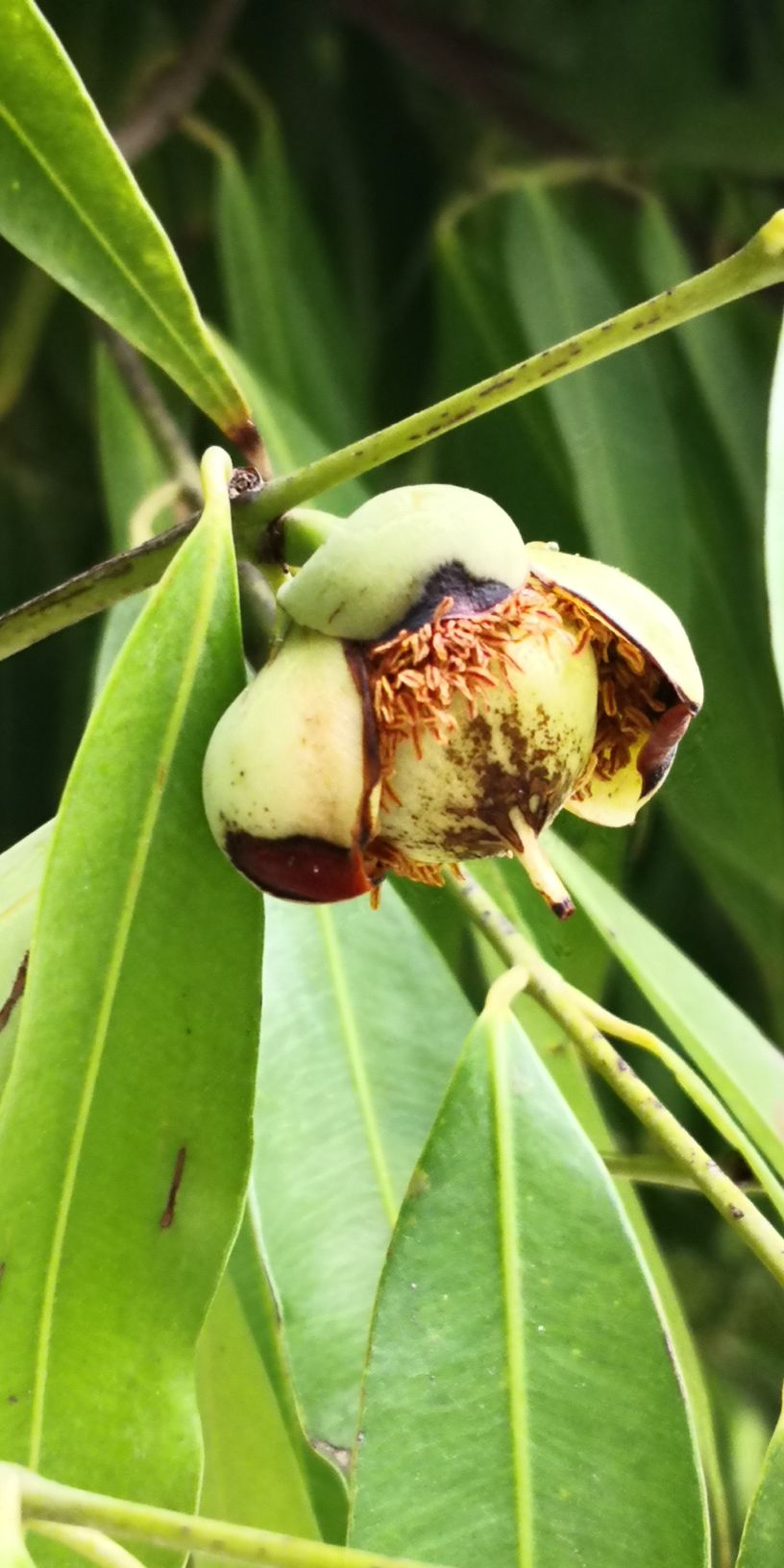
Young fruit

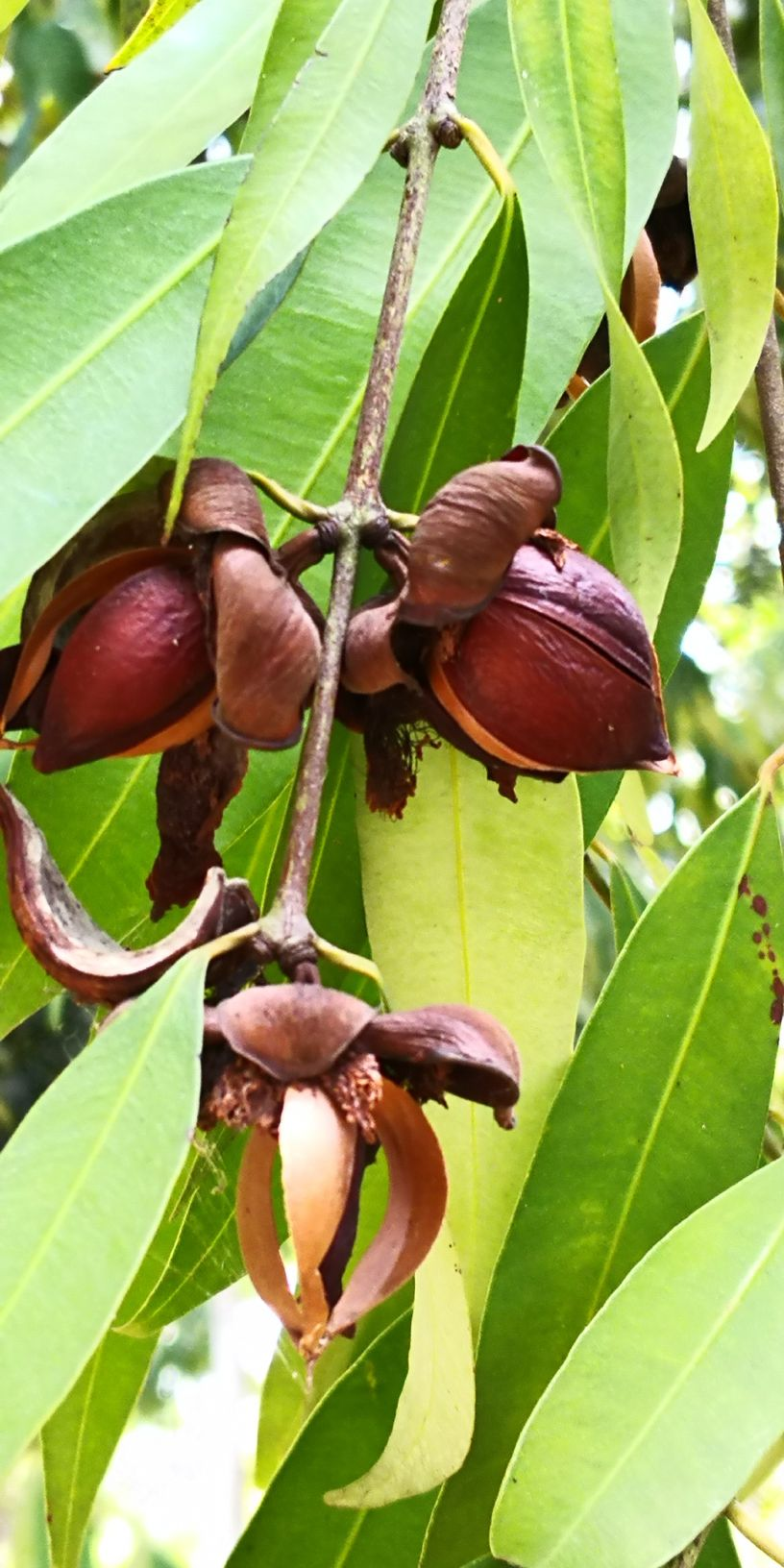
Ripe fruits

== See also ==
- List of Indian timber trees
- Nagkesar seed oil
