= Mesua purseglovei =

Conservation status
- Vulnerable (IUCN 2.3)

Scientific classification
- Kingdom: Plantae
- Clade: Tracheophytes
- Clade: Angiosperms
- Clade: Eudicots
- Clade: Rosids
- Order: Malpighiales
- Family: Calophyllaceae
- Genus: Mesua
- Species: M. purseglovei

Binomial name
- Mesua purseglovei Whitmore

Species of tree

Mesua purseglovei is a species of flowering plant in the family Calophyllaceae. It is a tree endemic to Peninsular Malaysia. It is threatened by habitat loss.
