= Mammea timorensis =

Conservation status
- Vulnerable (IUCN 2.3)

Scientific classification
- Kingdom: Plantae
- Clade: Tracheophytes
- Clade: Angiosperms
- Clade: Eudicots
- Clade: Rosids
- Order: Malpighiales
- Family: Calophyllaceae
- Genus: Mammea
- Species: M. timorensis

Binomial name
- Mammea timorensis Kosterm. (1962)

Species of flowering plant

Mammea timorensis is a species of flowering plant in the Calophyllaceae family. It is found only on the island of Timor, which is divided between the countries of East Timor and Indonesia.
