= Clusiella elegans =

Scientific classification
- Kingdom: Plantae
- Clade: Tracheophytes
- Clade: Angiosperms
- Clade: Eudicots
- Clade: Rosids
- Order: Malpighiales
- Family: Calophyllaceae
- Genus: Clusiella
- Species: C. elegans

Binomial name
- Clusiella elegans Planch. & Triana, 1860

Species of flowering plant

Clusiella elegans is a plant species in the genus Clusiella. When Planchon and Triana first published the genus in 1860, based on C. elegans, the genus was considered monotypic and remained as such for about 100 years. Isotype by Planchon and Triana is kept at University of Montpellier and is from Nueva Granada in northern Colombia (forests 2000 metres).
