= Mammea touriga =

Scientific classification
- Kingdom: Plantae
- Clade: Embryophytes
- Clade: Tracheophytes
- Clade: Spermatophytes
- Clade: Angiosperms
- Clade: Eudicots
- Clade: Rosids
- Order: Malpighiales
- Family: Calophyllaceae
- Genus: Mammea
- Species: M. touriga

Binomial name
- Mammea touriga (C.T.White & W.D.Francis) L.S.Sm.

Synonyms
- Calophyllum touriga C.T.White & W.D.Francis; Ochrocarpos touriga (C.T.White & W.D.Francis) L.S.Sm.

Species of plant

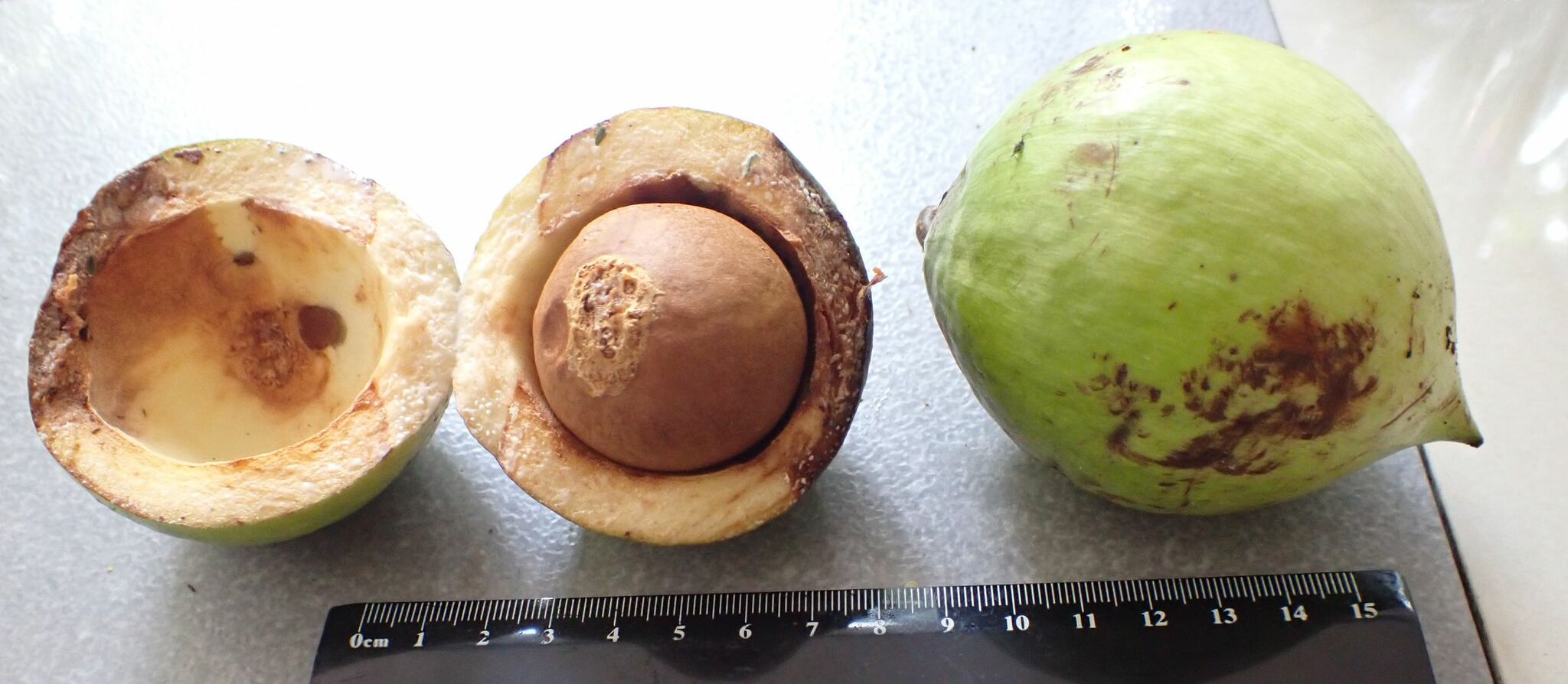
Mammea touriga

Mammea touriga, also known as brown touriga or alligatorbark, is a species of tree that belongs to the Calophyllaceae. It is native to north-eastern Australia.

== Description ==
The species grows as a tree with sticky, honey-coloured sap. The leaves are 13–20 cm long by 4–7 cm wide. The flowers are 20–25 mm in diameter. The fruits are spindle-shaped and 7–10 cm long by 5–7 cm wide, with fallen fruits eaten by musky rat-kangaroos.

== Distribution and habitat ==
The species is endemic to north-eastern Queensland where it has a restricted distribution in the Boonjee area of the Atherton Tableland. It occurs in mature rainforest, often on basalt soils, at elevations of 600–800 m.
