= Nagkesar seed oil =

Oil from the Nagkesar tree (Mesua ferrea)

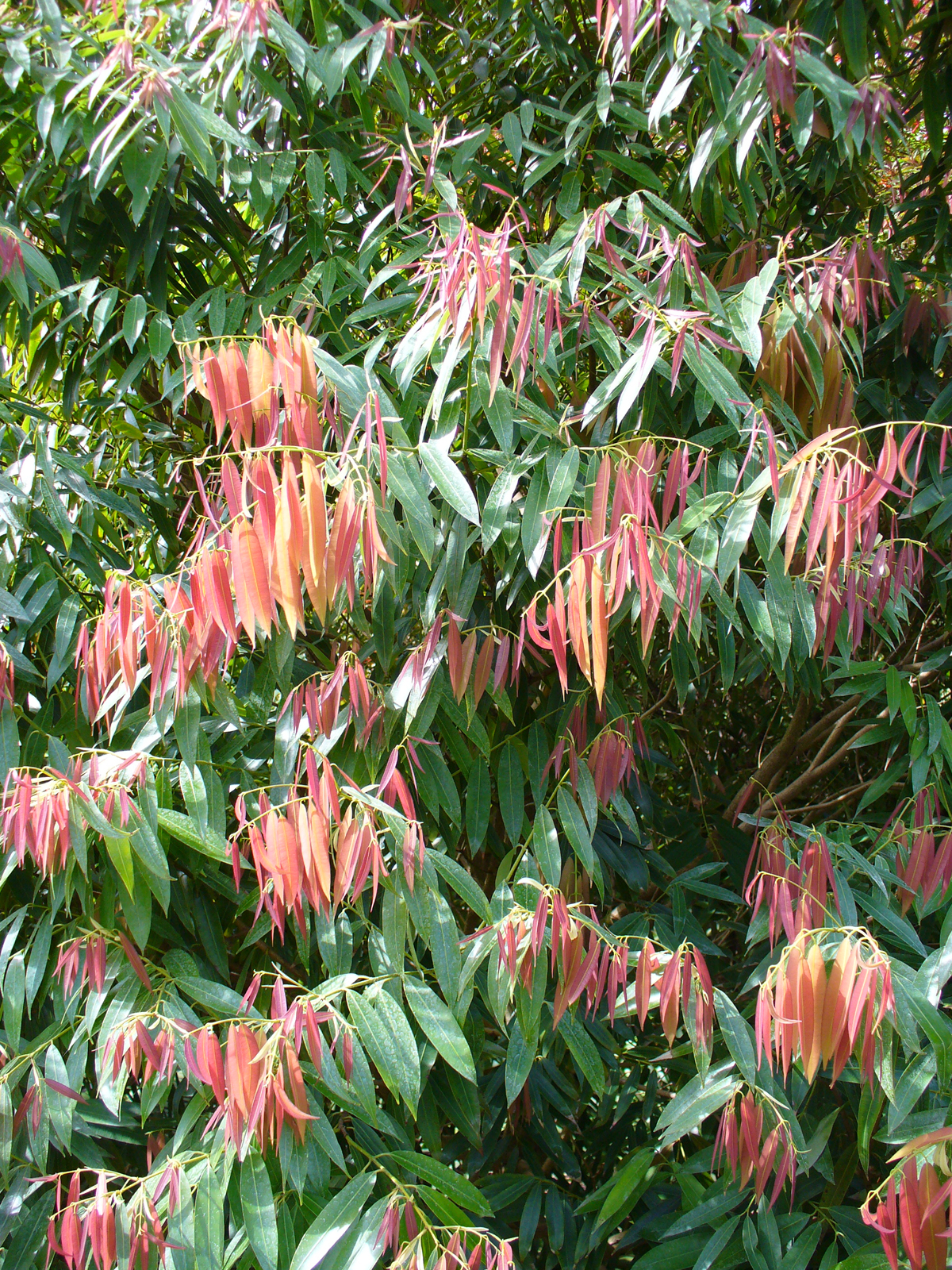
Tree

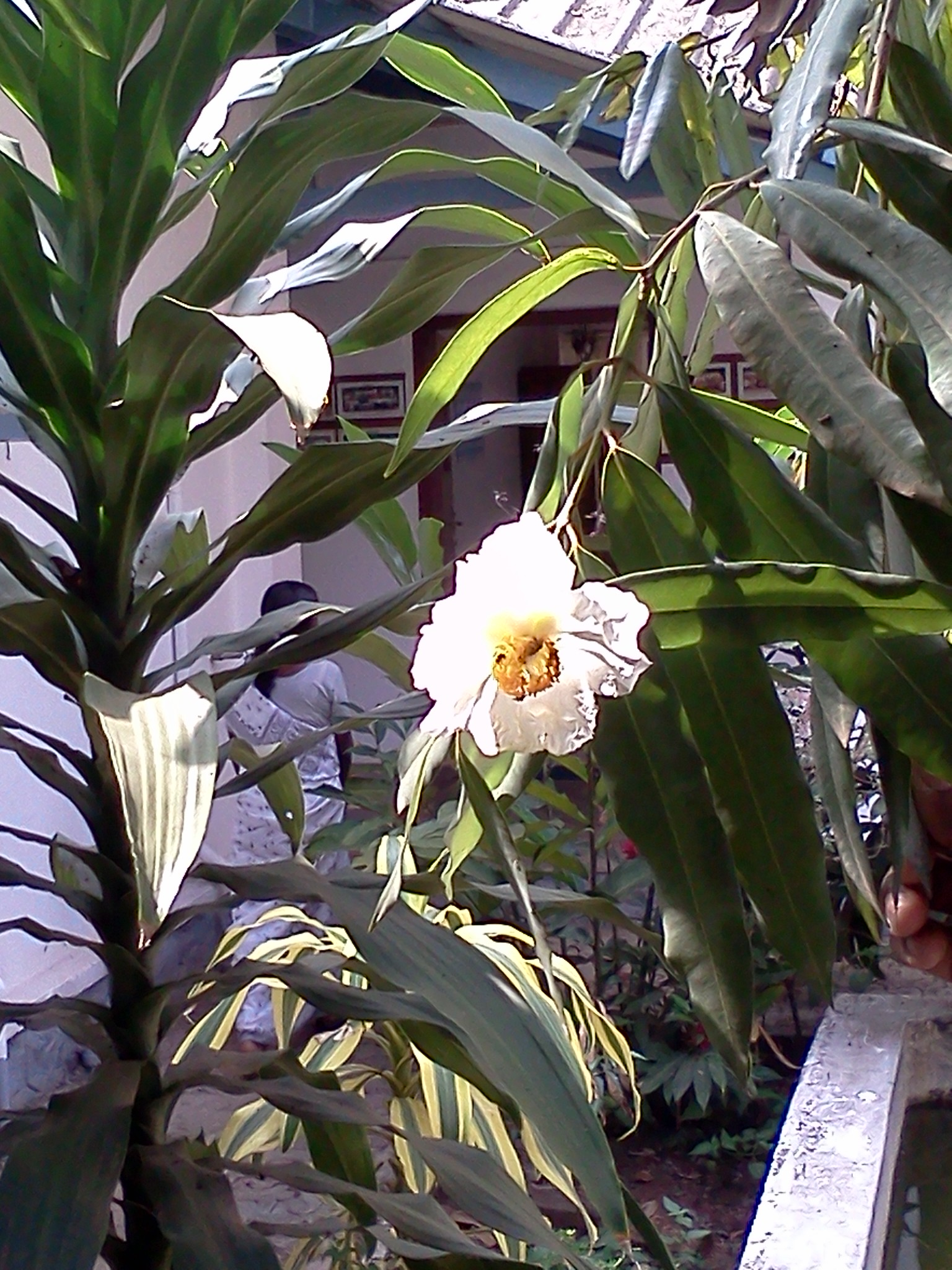
Flower

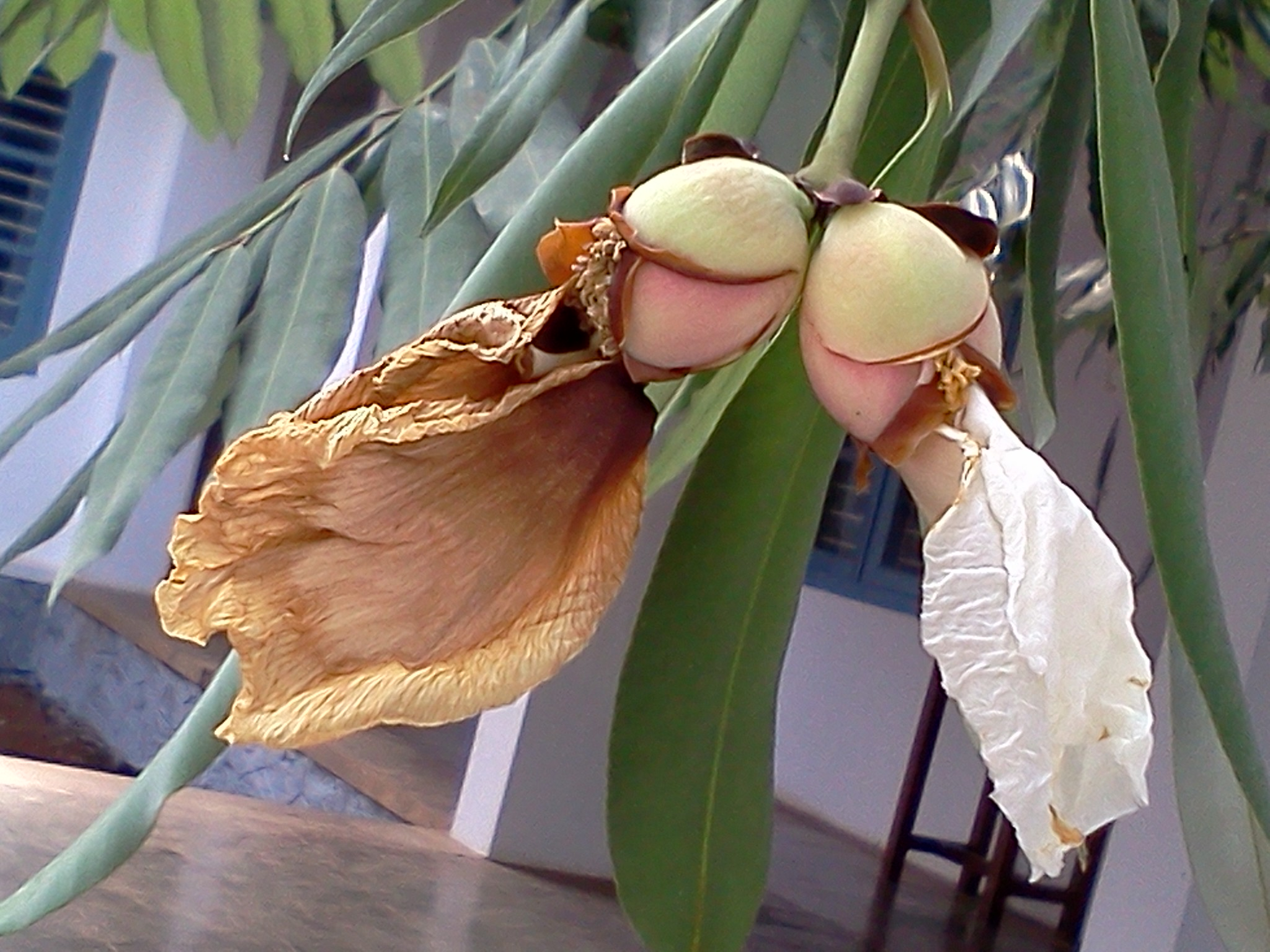
Fertilized flower

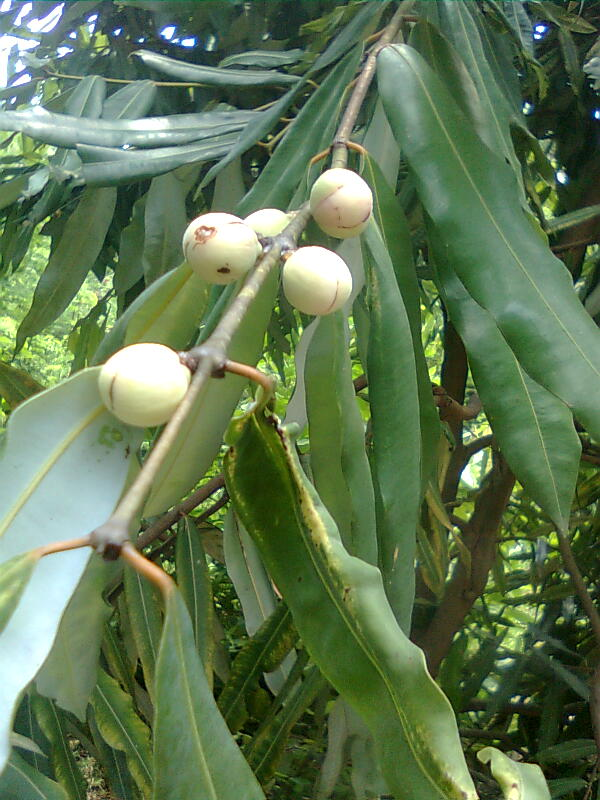
Raw fruit

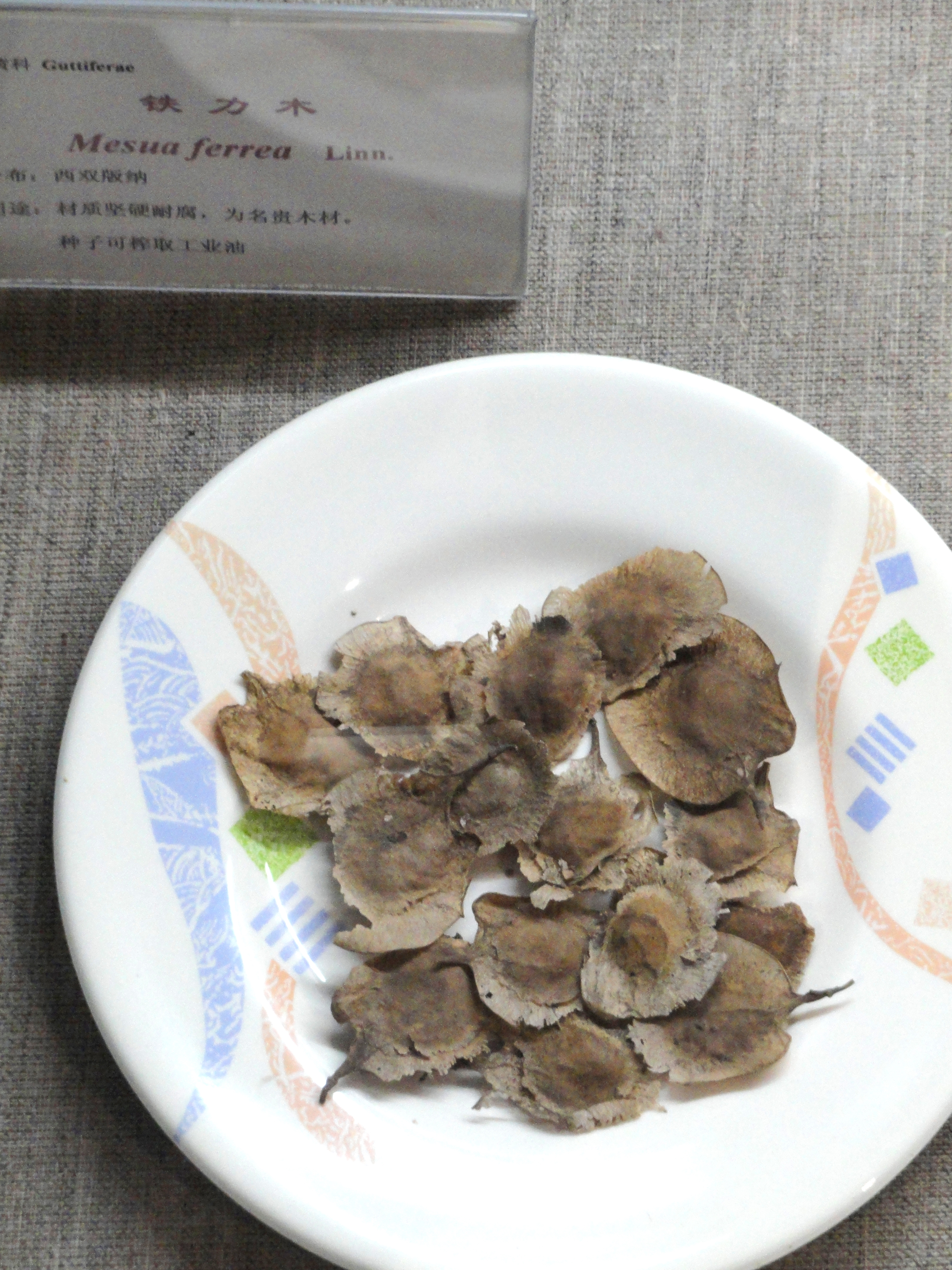
Seeds

Nagkesar oil is extracted from seeds of the nagkesar tree (Mesua ferrea, Hindi: नागकेसर). It belongs to the Calophyllaceae family. It is an East Indian evergreen tree and is often planted as an ornamental for its fragrant white flowers that yield a perfume. It is the source of hardwood used for railroad ties. It is Sri Lanka's national tree.

== Etymology ==
The generic name is after J. Mesue (777–857) and the specific epithet is from Latin, meaning 'belonging to iron', in reference to its famed and very hard, durable timber.

== Common names ==
It is commonly known as Ceylon ironwood, cobra's saffron, Indian rose chestnut, ironwood tree, mesua, poached egg tree

=== Common names in India ===
- Hindi− नाग चम्पा (Nag champa, नागकेसर( Nagkesar )
- Urdu− नर्मिश्क, Narmishka
- Tamil− Tadinangu, நாகப்பூ( nagappu), நாகேசுரம் (nakecuram)
- Marathi− Thorlachampa, नागचंपा (nagchampa), नागकेशर (nagakeshara)
- Malayalam− (Vainavu, ചുരുളി (churuli
- Assam− নোক্তে (Nokte ), নাহৰ (Nahor), নাগেশ্বৰ (Nageshwar)
- Meitei− নাগেসৰ (Nageshor )
- Telugu−నాగకేసరము (nagakesaramu)
- Sanskrit नागकेशर (nagakesarah), नागपुष्प( nagapuspah)
- Kannada− ನಾಗ ಕೇಸರಿ( nagakesari), ನಾಗ ಸಮ್ಪಿಗೆ (nagasampige)
- Bengali− নাগকেশর (nagkesar, পুন্নাগ (punnaga)
- Gujarati− નાગચંપા( nagachampa)
- Kashmiri− नागकेसर (nagkesarah)

=== Common name in other countries ===
- English− Ceylon ironwood, Cobra's saffron, Indian rose-chestnut, Iron-wood tree, Sembawang tree (Singapore)
- Italian− Croco di cobra
- German− Nagassamen
- Arabic− Narae-kaisar
- Russian− Indiiskoe zheleznoe derevo, Mezua zheleznaia, Mezuia zheleznaia, Nagakeshara (from Hindi), Zheleznoe derevo.
- Burmese− Gungen, Kenga
- Chinese- : Tie li mu, (Taiwan)
- Japanese− Tagayasan
- Thai- : Bhra na kaw, Bunnak (Boon naak), Ka ko (Karen), Gaa gaaw, Gam gaaw, Kam ko (Shan), Saan phee daawy, Saraphi doi (Chiang Mai)

== Habitat ==
M. ferrea reaches up to 100 feet (30 m) height. The tree is native to Sri Lanka, India, southern Nepal, Burma, Thailand, Indochina, the Philippines, Malaysia and Sumatra, where it grows in evergreen forests, especially in river valleys. In the Himalayas and India the tree can grow at altitudes up to 1,500 m (4,900 ft) and in Sri Lanka up to 1,000 m (3,300 ft). It is the only ironwood forest in the dry zone with wet zone vegetation.

== Morphology ==
=== Tree ===
M. ferrea is a small to medium-size evergreen It grows up to 13 m (43 ft) tall, often buttressed at the base with a trunk up to 90 cm (35 in) in diameter. It has simple, narrow, oblong, dark green leaves 7–15 cm (2.8–5.9 in) long, with a whitish underside. The emerging young leaves are red to yellowish pink and droop. The wood is hard, heavy and strong at about 72 pounds per cubic foot (1.15 g/cm^{3}). Its density is 1.12 ton/m^{3}.

=== Flowers ===
Its flowers are terminal or axillary, bisexual, solitary or in an up to nine-flowered open panicle, pedicel with small paired bracts. It has four decussate sepals sub-orbicular, persistent and variously enlarged and thickened in fruit. Stamens are numerous, free or connate only at the base, ovary superior (1-2 celled) each cell with one to two axillary ovules. They are slender with a peltate to four-lobed stigma. The flowers are 4–7.5 cm (1.6–3.0 in) diameter, with four white petals. The flowers are used to make an incense and to stuff pillows.

=== Fruits ===
The fruit is a capsule, usually globule, often beaked, thinly woody, usually dehiscing with two to four valves before falling, often exuding resinous droplets. One fruit contains one to four seeds. Fruits are reddish, conical hard and ovoid. The fruit diameter is 3.0" and nearly woody. Fruits are ovoid, 2.5–5 cm (1.0–2.0 in) long with persistent calyx. The seeds are dark brown fleshy oily cotyledons. Fruits weigh from 50–60 g (1.8–2.1 oz) each.

=== Seeds ===
The fruit contains one round or three conical brown, shiny, seeds consisting of the kernel (cotyledons, 36.6%) within a fibrous outer cover (50% seed) and brittle shell (13.4%). M. ferrea seeds contained lipids (66.91-70.23 g %), moisture (4.02-5.05 g %), ash (1.46-1.50 g %), total protein (6.99-7.19 g %), water-soluble protein (2.98-3.11 g %), starch (5.51-5.85 g %), crude fiber (1.22-1.98 g %), carbohydrate (15.88-18.68 g %). The energy value is 700.55-724.15 kcal/100 g.

== Physical properties and composition ==
The major fatty acids in nagkesar oil are oleic acid, linoleic acid, stearic acid, and palmitic acid. Polyphenols and volatiles can contribute an unpleasant odour. These include the 4-phenyl coumarins mesuol, mammeisin, mesuagin and mammeigin.

Fatty acid composition
Fatty acid	percentage
Myristic acid (C14:0)	0.0-2.8
Palmitic acid (C16:0)	8.0-16.5
Stearic acid (C18:0)	10.0-15.8
Oleic acid (C18:1)	55-66
Linoleic acid (C20:0)	0-1.0

Physical properties
Character	Range/limit
Refractive Indexat, 40^{0}C	1.465-1.475
Iodine value	65-95
Saponification value	195-205
Moisture	1.0-1.5
Color 1/4" cell(Y+5R)	25-35
Unsaponifiable matter %	2.0-2.5

=== See also ===
- Mesua ferrea
- Nagkesar
- Trees of India
