= Mesua nuda =

Conservation status
- Least Concern (IUCN 2.3)

Scientific classification
- Kingdom: Plantae
- Clade: Tracheophytes
- Clade: Angiosperms
- Clade: Eudicots
- Clade: Rosids
- Order: Malpighiales
- Family: Calophyllaceae
- Genus: Mesua
- Species: M. nuda

Binomial name
- Mesua nuda Kosterm. ex Whitm.

Species of tree

Mesua nuda is a species of flowering plant in the family Calophyllaceae. It is a tree endemic to Peninsular Malaysia.
