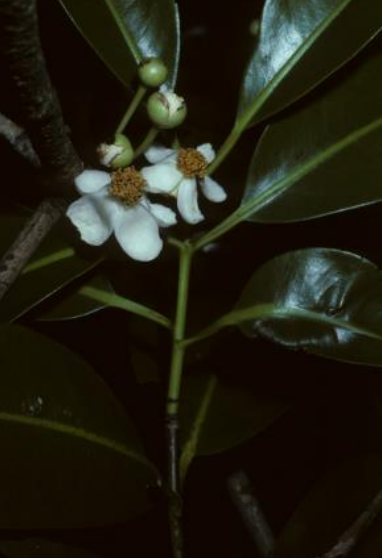

Scientific classification
- Kingdom: Plantae
- Clade: Embryophytes
- Clade: Tracheophytes
- Clade: Angiosperms
- Clade: Eudicots
- Clade: Rosids
- Order: Malpighiales
- Family: Calophyllaceae
- Genus: Mammea
- Species: M. glauca

Binomial name
- Mammea glauca (Merr.) Kosterm.

Synonyms
- Ochrocarpos glaucus Merr.

= Mammea glauca =

Species of flowering plant

Mammea glauca is a species of plant in the family Calophyllaceae. It is endemic to Samoa.

== See also ==
- Flora of Samoa
