= Neotatea =

Scientific classification
- Kingdom: Plantae
- Clade: Tracheophytes
- Clade: Angiosperms
- Clade: Eudicots
- Clade: Rosids
- Order: Malpighiales
- Family: Calophyllaceae
- Genus: Neotatea; Maguire

Species
- Neotatea colombiana Maguire; Neotatea duidae (Kobuski & Steyerm.) P.F.Stevens & A.L.Weitzman; Neotatea longifolia (Gleason) Maguire; Neotatea neblinae Maguire

Genus of flowering plants

Neotatea is a plant genus in the family Calophyllaceae. It is found in northwestern South America, primarily southern Colombia and Venezuela. Four species are currently recognized in the genus:

- Neotatea colombiana Maguire
- Neotatea duidae (Kobuski & Steyerm.) P.F.Stevens & A.L.Weitzman
- Neotatea longifolia (Gleason) Maguire
- Neotatea neblinae Maguire
