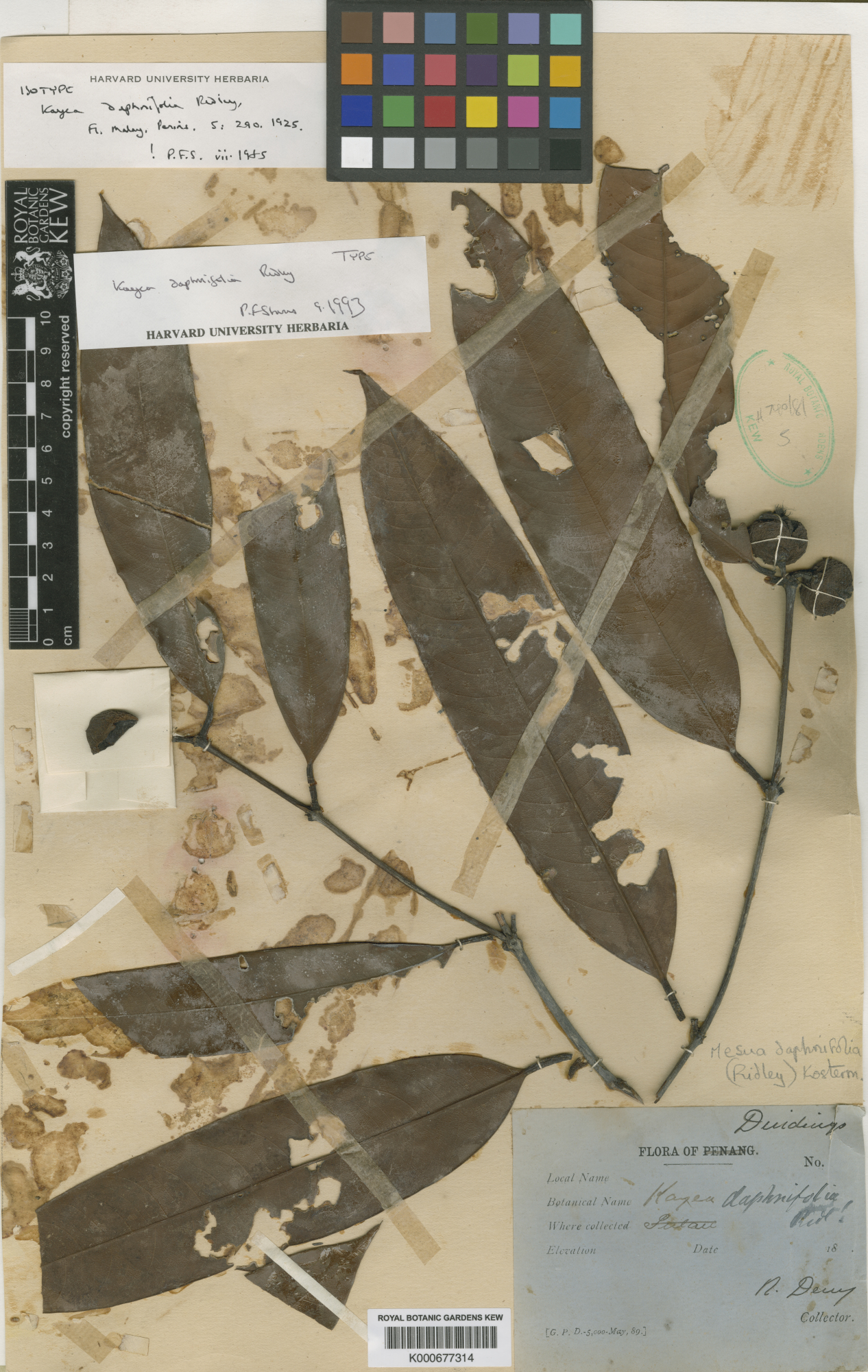

Conservation status
- Least Concern (IUCN 2.3)

Scientific classification
- Kingdom: Plantae
- Clade: Tracheophytes
- Clade: Angiosperms
- Clade: Eudicots
- Clade: Rosids
- Order: Malpighiales
- Family: Calophyllaceae
- Genus: Kayea
- Species: K. daphnifolia

Binomial name
- Kayea daphnifolia Ridl. (1925)

Synonyms
- Mesua daphnifolia (Ridl.) Kosterm. (1969)

= Kayea daphnifolia =

Species of tree

Kayea daphnifolia is a species of flowering plant in the family Calophyllaceae. It is a tree endemic to Peninsular Malaysia.
