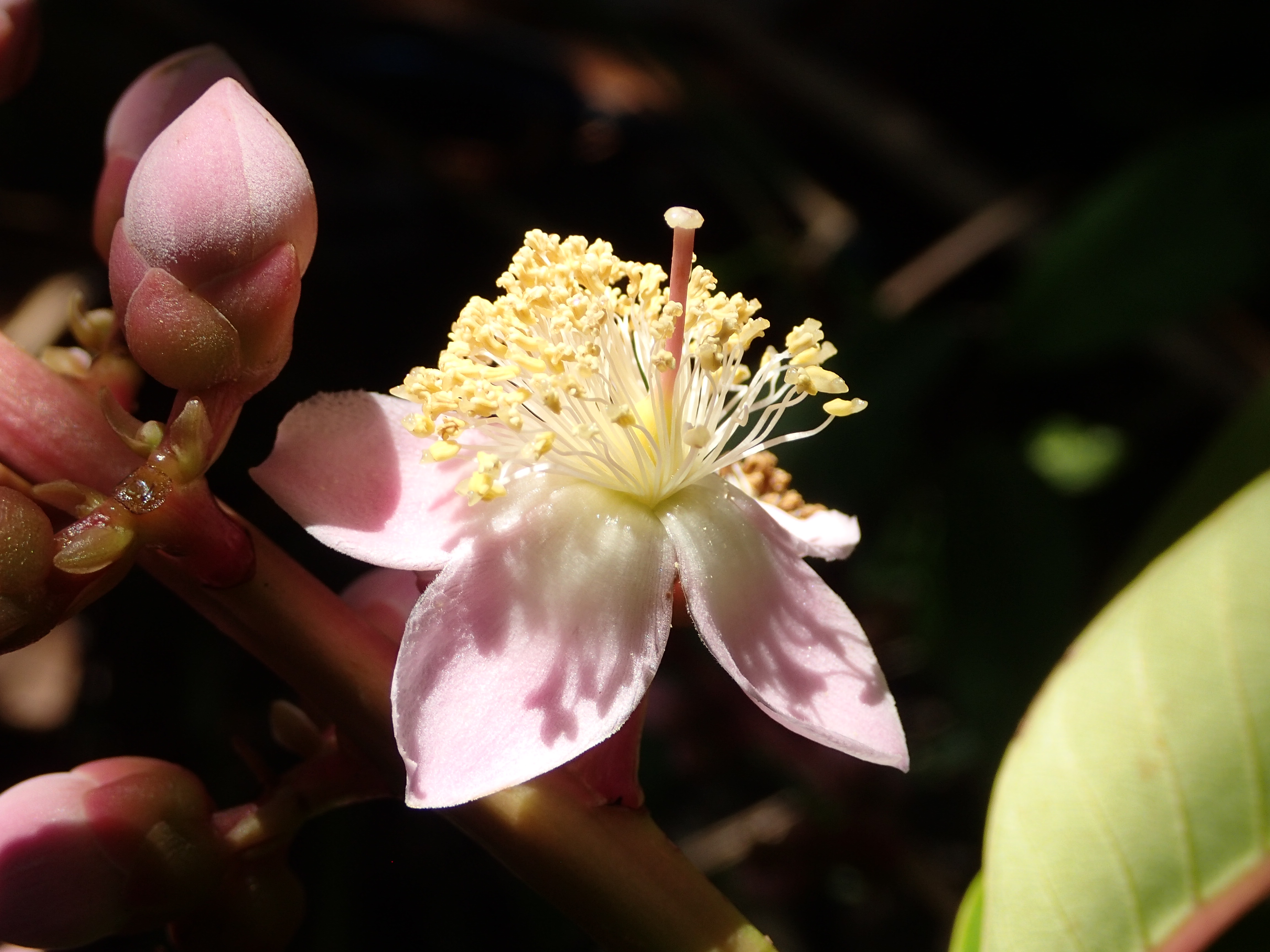
- Mahurea palustris

Scientific classification
- Kingdom: Plantae
- Clade: Embryophytes
- Clade: Tracheophytes
- Clade: Spermatophytes
- Clade: Angiosperms
- Clade: Eudicots
- Clade: Rosids
- Order: Malpighiales
- Family: Calophyllaceae
- Genus: Mahurea; Aubl.

Species
- Mahurea exstipulata Benth.; Mahurea palustris Aubl.

= Mahurea =

Genus of flowering plants

Mahurea is a genus of flowering plants in the family Calophyllaceae. The genus comprises two species, native to Colombia, Venezuela, Guyana, French Guiana, Peru, and northern Brazil.

The species are shrubs or medium-sized evergreen trees with reddish wood. They bear terminal panicles of pinkish or purplish flowers.
