= Kayea manii =

Conservation status
- Critically Endangered (IUCN 2.3)

Scientific classification
- Kingdom: Plantae
- Clade: Tracheophytes
- Clade: Angiosperms
- Clade: Eudicots
- Clade: Rosids
- Order: Malpighiales
- Family: Calophyllaceae
- Genus: Kayea
- Species: K. manii

Binomial name
- Kayea manii King

Synonyms
- Mesua manii (King) Kosterm. (1969)

Species of flowering plant

Kayea manii is a species of flowering plant in the Calophyllaceae family. It is found only on South Andaman Island in India. It is threatened by habitat loss.
