= Nag champa =

Fragrance from India

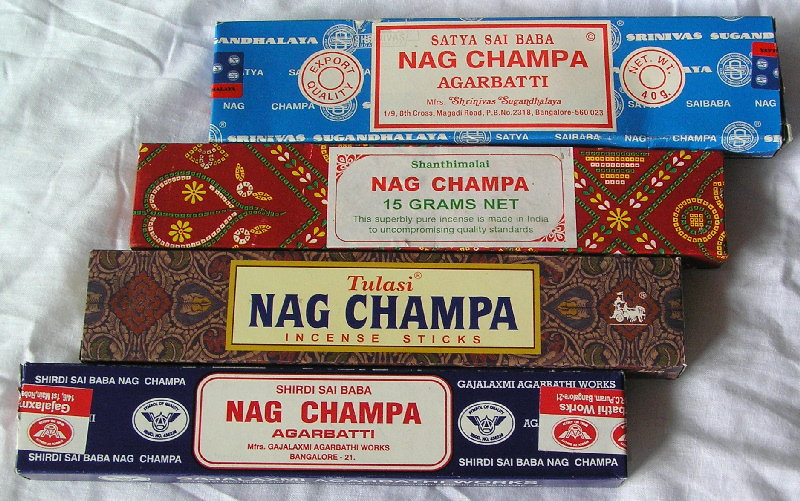
Various examples of nag champa incense

Nag champa is a commercial fragrance of Indian origin. It is made from a combination of sandalwood and either champak or frangipani. When frangipani is used, the fragrance is usually referred to simply as champa.

Nag champa is commonly used in incense, soap, perfume oil, candles, wax melts, and personal toiletries. It is a popular and recognizable incense fragrance.

== Composition ==
A number of flower species in India are known as champa or champak:

- Magnolia champaca, formerly classified as Michelia champaca (swarna champa or yellow champa)
- Plumeria rubra (frangipani)
- Mesua ferrea (nagkeshar or nagchampa)

Of these, Magnolia champaca is mostly used to prepare the nag champa scent, while Plumeria or Mesua ferrea may be used for scents termed champa and sometimes nag champa.

Nag champa perfume ingredients vary with the manufacturer, though generally they include sandalwood and magnolia, which, as the plant is related to star anise, gives the scent a little spice. Other ingredients will depend on the finished product. Perfume-dipped incenses and soaps would use essential and/or fragrance oils or scents, while masala incenses might use finely ground fragrant ingredients and/or oils.
