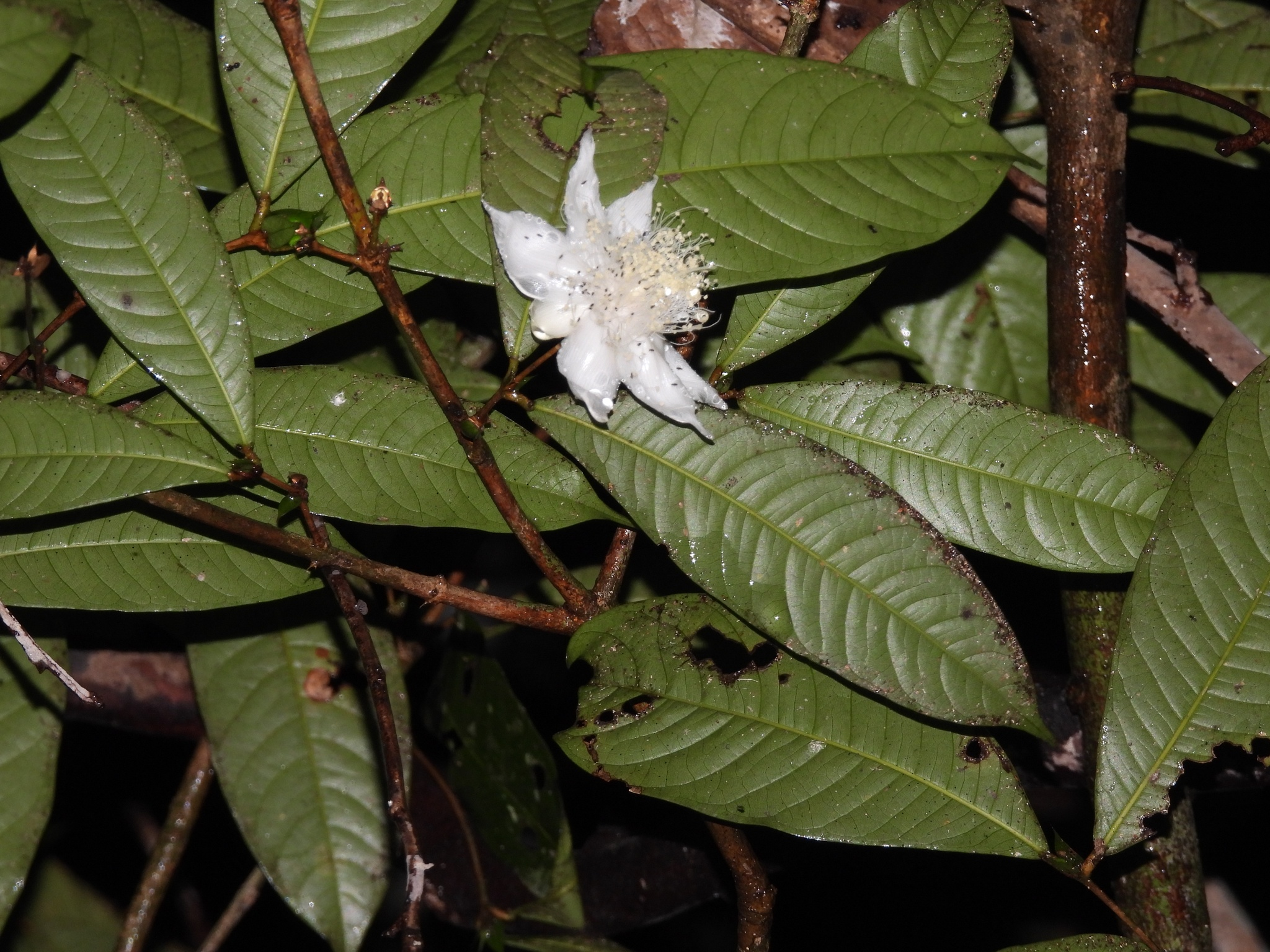
- Kayea kunstleri in Malaysia

Scientific classification
- Kingdom: Plantae
- Clade: Embryophytes
- Clade: Tracheophytes
- Clade: Angiosperms
- Clade: Eudicots
- Clade: Rosids
- Order: Malpighiales
- Family: Calophyllaceae
- Genus: Kayea; Wall.

Species
- See text

= Kayea =

Genus of flowering plants

Kayea is a plant genus in the family Calophyllaceae. Its species range from Bangladesh and the eastern Himalayas to Sri Lanka, Indochina, Peninsular Malaysia, Borneo, Sumatra, the Philippines, New Guinea, and Queensland.

== Species ==
41 species are currently accepted:

- Kayea assamica Prain – Assam, Myanmar, and Peninsular Malaysia
- Kayea beccariana Baill. – Sumatra and Borneo
- Kayea borneensis P.F.Stevens – Borneo (Sabah)
- Kayea calophylloides Ridl. – Borneo
- Kayea catharinae Merr. – northern Sumatra
- Kayea concinna W.E.Cooper & Zich – Queensland
- Kayea coriacea (P.F.Stevens) P.F.Stevens – New Guinea
- Kayea daphnifolia Ridl. – Peninsular Malaysia
- Kayea elegans King – Peninsular Thailand and Peninsular Malaysia
- Kayea elmeri Merr. – Borneo
- Kayea eugeniifolia Pierre – Cambodia
- Kayea ferruginea Pierre – southern Indochina (Vietnam, Cambodia, and Thailand), Peninsular Malaysia, and Borneo
- Kayea floribunda Wall. – Eastern Himalayas, Bangladesh, Assam, and Vietnam
- Kayea garciae (Fern.-Vill.) Vesque – Philippines
- Kayea grandis King – Peninsular Malaysia and Borneo
- Kayea korthalsiana Pierre – Borneo
- Kayea kunstleri King – Peninsular Thailand and Peninsular Malaysia
- Kayea laevis Kosterm. – Borneo
- Kayea lanceolata Merr. – Philippines (Luzon)
- Kayea larnachiana F.Muell. – northeastern Queensland
- Kayea lepidota (T.Anderson) Pierre – Peninsular Malaysia and Sumatra
- Kayea macrantha Baill. – Borneo
- Kayea macrophylla Kaneh. & Hatus. – New Guinea
- Kayea manii King – Andaman Islands
- Kayea megalocarpa Merr. – Philippines (Luzon)
- Kayea meridionalis W.E.Cooper & Zich – Queensland
- Kayea myrtifolia Baill. – Borneo
- Kayea navesii (Fern.-Vill.) Vesque – Philippines (Luzon)
- Kayea nervosa (Planch. & Triana) T.Anderson – southern Indochina (Cambodia, Thailand, and Myanmar) and Peninsular Malaysia (Perak)
- Kayea oblongifolia Ridl. – Borneo
- Kayea pacifica Hosok. – Palau
- Kayea paludosa Kosterm. – Sumatra
- Kayea paniculata (Blanco) Merr. – Philippines
- Kayea parviflora Ridl. – Peninsular Malaysia
- Kayea philippinensis Planch. – Philippines
- Kayea racemosa Planch. & Triana – Peninsular Malaysia
- Kayea rosea Ridl. – Peninsular Malaysia (Johor)
- Kayea scalarinervosa P.F.Stevens – Borneo (Brunei)
- Kayea stylosa Thwaites – southwestern Sri Lanka
- Kayea sukoeana Bor – Myanmar
- Kayea wrayi King – Peninsular Malaysia
