= Kayea rosea =

Conservation status
- Conservation Dependent (IUCN 2.3)

Scientific classification
- Kingdom: Plantae
- Clade: Tracheophytes
- Clade: Angiosperms
- Clade: Eudicots
- Clade: Rosids
- Order: Malpighiales
- Family: Calophyllaceae
- Genus: Kayea
- Species: K. rosea

Binomial name
- Kayea rosea Ridl. (1910)

Synonyms
- Mesua rosea (Ridl.) Kosterm. (1969)

Species of tree

Kayea rosea is a species of flowering plant in the family Calophyllaceae. It is a tree endemic to Peninsular Malaysia. It is threatened by habitat loss.
