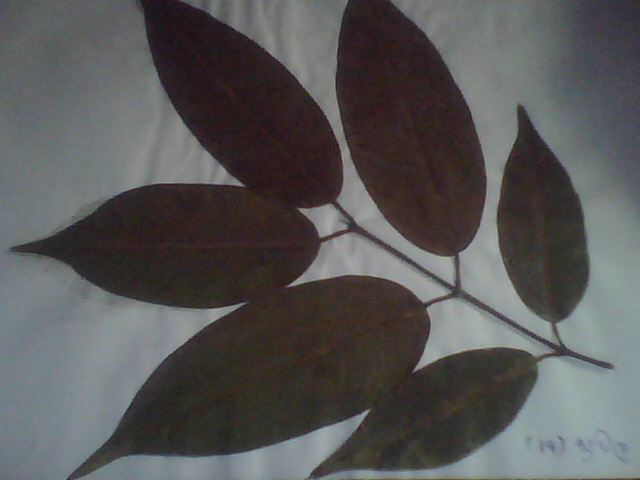

Conservation status
- Critically Endangered (IUCN 2.3)

Scientific classification
- Kingdom: Plantae
- Clade: Embryophytes
- Clade: Tracheophytes
- Clade: Angiosperms
- Clade: Eudicots
- Clade: Rosids
- Order: Malpighiales
- Family: Calophyllaceae
- Genus: Kayea
- Species: K. stylosa

Binomial name
- Kayea stylosa Thwaites (1858)

Synonyms
- Kayea cuspidata Planch. & Triana (1861); Mesua stylosa (Thwaites) Kosterm. (1969)

= Kayea stylosa =

Species of flowering plant

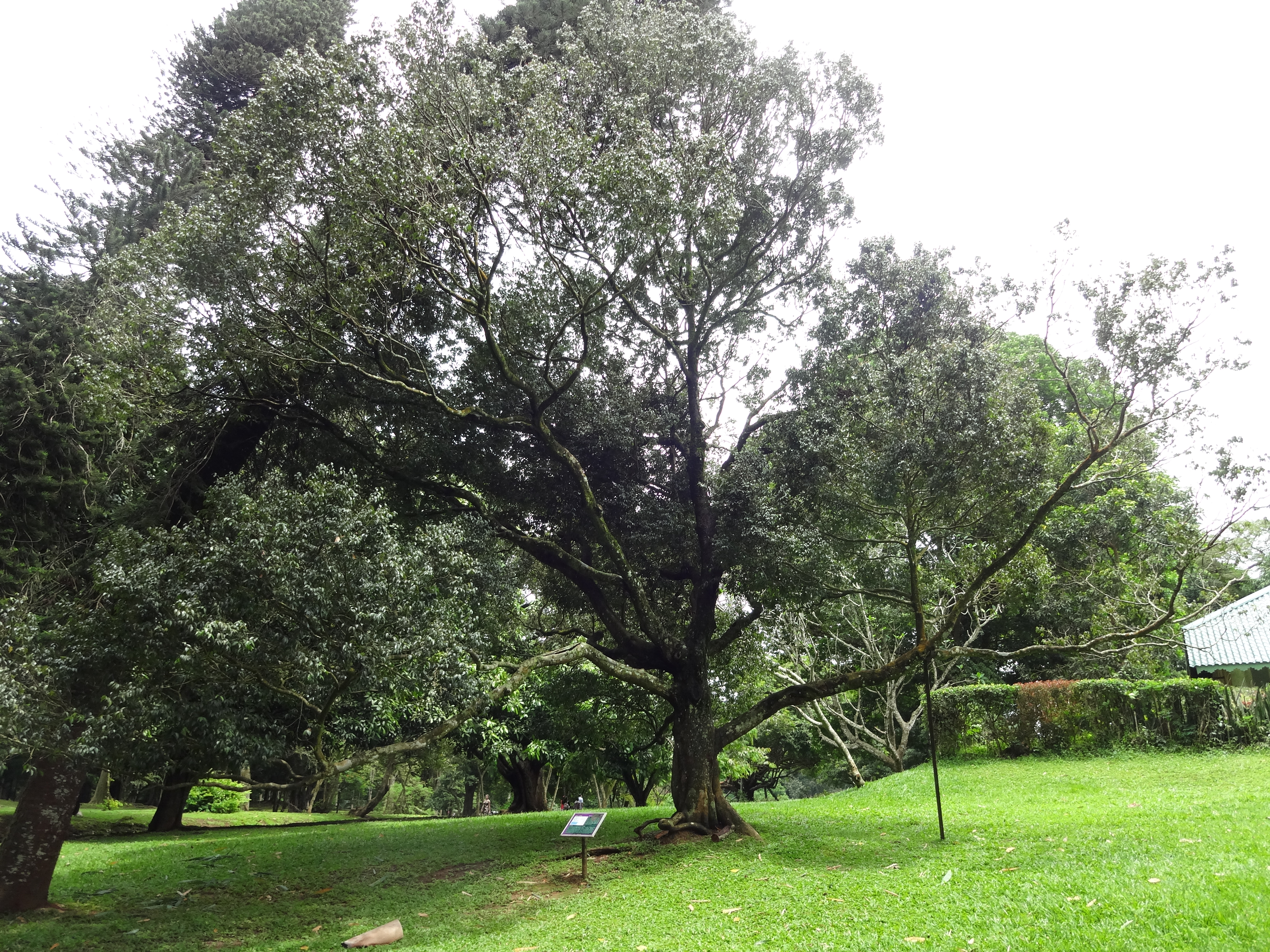
Kayea stylosa in the Royal Botanical Gardens, Peradeniya.

Kayea stylosa is a species of flowering plant in the Calophyllaceae family. It is a tree endemic to southwestern Sri Lanka.
