= Mammea africana =

Conservation status
- Least Concern (IUCN 3.1)

Scientific classification
- Kingdom: Plantae
- Clade: Tracheophytes
- Clade: Angiosperms
- Clade: Eudicots
- Clade: Rosids
- Order: Malpighiales
- Family: Calophyllaceae
- Genus: Mammea
- Species: M. africana

Binomial name
- Mammea africana Sabine

Synonyms
- Garcinia golaensis Hutch. & Dalziel; Mammea ebboro Pierre; Mammea gilletii De Wild.; Mammea giorgiana De Wild.; Ochrocarpos africana (Sabine) Oliv.

Species of flowering plant

Mammea africana is a medium to large sized tree within the family Calophyllaceae. It is also known as the African mammee apple, and its timber is traded under the trade name "Oboto". Mammea africana is found in evergreen and semi deciduous forests in West and Central Tropical Africa.

The species was described by Joseph Sabine in 1827.

== Description ==
A medium to large sized tree that can grow up to 40 meters tall with a dark green crown of short spreading branches, it has a cylindrical and straight trunk, that can be up to 27 meters tall without branches. Leaves are simple, coriaceous and thick, the upper surface is glossy dark green while beneath is less shiny and glabrous, the petiole is 0.4–1.5 cm long; leaf-blade is elliptical to oblong in outline, 12–26 cm long and 4–10 cm wide. Flower is axillary on leafy shoots and cauliflorous, with buds that are globular; pedicel is up to 4 cm long, petals are 4, white and caducous, up to 3 cm long. Fruit is a thick drupe, warty, up to 10 cm long, pale yellow in color, it has a coriaceous exocarp, while the mesocarp is juicy and fibrous, yellowish in color, the seed in the endocarp can be up to 65.7mm (2.6 inches) long and 48.7mm (1.9 inches) in thickness. but its most remarkable characteristic is that these seeds have no cotyledons (seed leaves)

== Distribution ==
Mammea africana is native to west and central tropical Africa, ranging from Senegal to Angola and southwestern Uganda.

== Chemistry ==
Test on stem bark extracts of Mammea africana identified the presence of coumarin derivatives many identified in Mammea americana, such as mammea A/AA, mammea B/BB and mammea A/AB, the compounds showed inhibitory effects on microbial activity but also indicated moderate cytotoxicity of a human cell line.

== Uses ==
Extracts of the species are used to treat fever, stomach pains and skin infections such as scabies. Wood is used for local carpentry work, piling and joinery. The fruit is edible though fibrous, it is eaten by locals.
