= Kayea wrayi =

Conservation status
- Data Deficient (IUCN 3.1)

Scientific classification
- Kingdom: Plantae
- Clade: Tracheophytes
- Clade: Angiosperms
- Clade: Eudicots
- Clade: Rosids
- Order: Malpighiales
- Family: Calophyllaceae
- Genus: Kayea
- Species: K. wrayi

Binomial name
- Kayea wrayi King (1890)

Synonyms
- Mesua wrayi (King) Kosterm. (1969)

Species of flowering plant

Kayea wrayi is a species of flowering plant in the family Calophyllaceae. It is endemic to Peninsular Malaysia.
