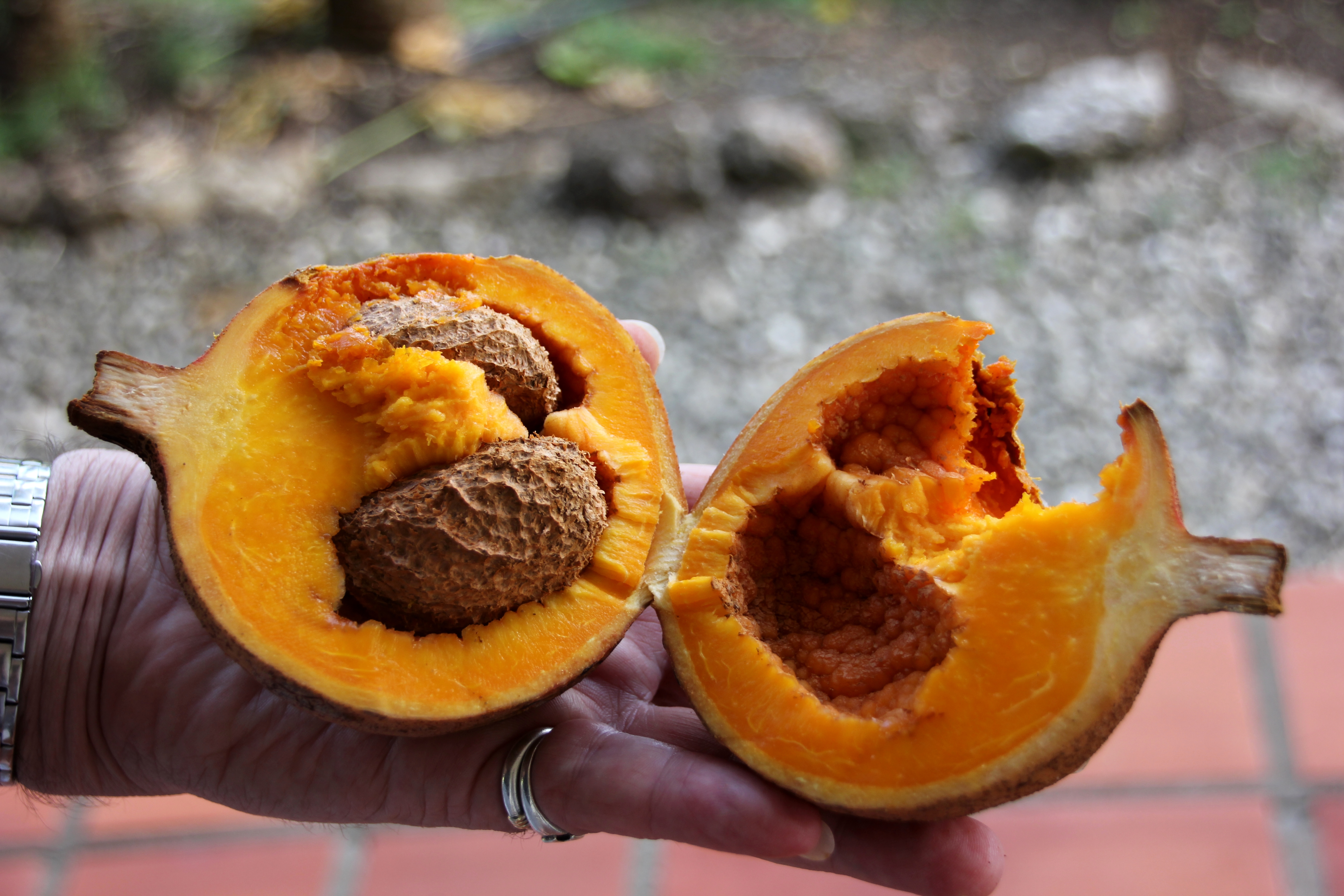
- Mammea americana fruit cross-section

Scientific classification
- Kingdom: Plantae
- Clade: Tracheophytes
- Clade: Angiosperms
- Clade: Eudicots
- Clade: Rosids
- Order: Malpighiales
- Family: Calophyllaceae
- Genus: Mammea; L.

Species
- see text

Synonyms
- Calysaccion Wight; Lolanara Raf.; Mamei Mill.; Paramammea J.-F.Leroy; Potamocharis Rottb.

= Mammea =

Mammea Temporal range: Miocene - recent

Genus of trees

Mammea is a flowering plant genus with about 70 species in the family Calophyllaceae. Its members are evergreen trees having edible fruits. The plants are dioecious, i.e. each individual plant produces either male or female flowers only. The calyx is fully fused initially, splitting into two or three valvate sepals. There are four to eight petals. Berries are formed, containing one to four seeds. The leaves are rigid, coriaceous and often have pellucid dots.

== Species ==
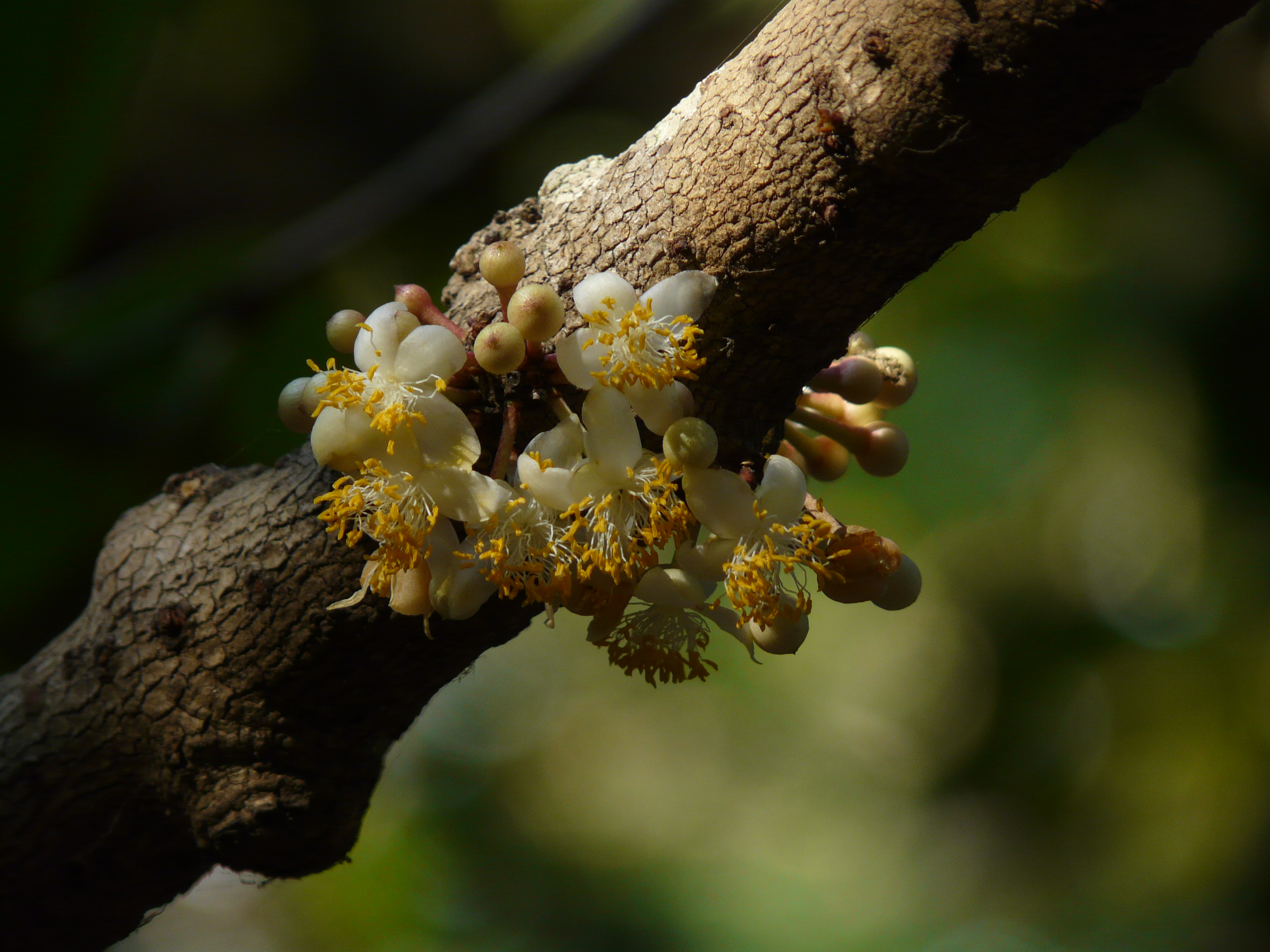
Mammea suriga flower

A least two species are found in tropical America and the West Indies (Mammea americana and M. immansueta), about 20 species, including M. africana and M. usambarensis in mainland Africa and many in Madagascar, with the remainder in Indomalaya and the Pacific region. As of June 2025, Plants of the World Online accepts the following 45 species:

- Mammea acuminata (Kosterm.) Kosterm.
- Mammea africana Sabine – African mammee apple
- Mammea americana L.
- Mammea anastomosans (Miq.) Kosterm.
- Mammea angustifolia Planch. & Triana
- Mammea aruana Kosterm.
- Mammea bongo (R.Vig. & Humbert) Kosterm.
- Mammea brevipetiolata Kosterm.
- Mammea calciphila Kosterm.
- Mammea calophylloides Kosterm.
- Mammea cauliflora (Baker) P.F.Stevens
- Mammea congregata (Boerl.) Kosterm.
- Mammea cordata P.F.Stevens
- Mammea eugenioides Planch. & Triana
- Mammea glauca (Merr.) Kosterm.
- Mammea glaucifolia (H.Perrier) Kosterm.
- Mammea grandifolia P.F.Stevens
- Mammea harmandii (Pierre) Kosterm.
- Mammea immansueta D'Arcy
- Mammea lancilimba Kosterm.
- Mammea malayana Kosterm.
- Mammea megaphylla (J.-F.Leroy) P.F.Stevens
- Mammea micrantha (Pierre) Kosterm.
- Mammea nervosa (Kurz) Kosterm.
- Mammea neurophylla (Schltr.) Kosterm.
- Mammea novoguineensis (Kaneh. & Hatus.) Kosterm.
- Mammea odorata (Raf.) Kosterm.
- Mammea papuana (Lauterb.) Kosterm.
- Mammea papyracea P.F.Stevens
- Mammea pseudoprotorhus (H.Perrier) P.F.Stevens
- Mammea punctata (H.Perrier) P.F.Stevens
- Mammea ramiflora (Merr.) Kosterm.
- Mammea reticulata Kosterm.
- Mammea sanguinea (Jum. & H.Perrier) Kosterm.
- Mammea sessiliflora Planch. & Triana
- Mammea siamensis (Miq.) T.Anderson
- Mammea sinclairii Kosterm.
- Mammea suriga (Buch.-Ham. ex Roxb.) Kosterm.
- Mammea timorensis Kosterm.
- Mammea touriga (C.T.White & W.D.Francis) L.S.Sm.
- Mammea usambarensis Verdc.
- Mammea veimauriensis P.F.Stevens
- Mammea woodii Kosterm.
- Mammea yunnanensis (H.L.Li) Kosterm.
- Mammea zeereae P.F.Stevens
