= Haploclathra =

Scientific classification
- Kingdom: Plantae
- Clade: Embryophytes
- Clade: Tracheophytes
- Clade: Spermatophytes
- Clade: Angiosperms
- Clade: Eudicots
- Clade: Rosids
- Order: Malpighiales
- Family: Calophyllaceae
- Genus: Haploclathra; Benth.

Genus of flowering plants

Haploclathra is a plant genus in the family Calophyllaceae. It includes species native to the Amazon basin of Brazil, Colombia, Guyana, and Peru.

== Species ==
Four species are accepted.

- Haploclathra cordata R.Vásquez
- Haploclathra grandiflora Aspl.
- Haploclathra leiantha Benth.
- Haploclathra paniculata Benth.
