= Maṅgala Buddha =

Sixth of 28 Buddhas before Siddhartha Gautama

Maṃgala Buddha
- Sanskrit: Maṃgala
- Pāli: Maṅgala
- Burmese: မင်္ဂလဘုရား
- Chinese: 吉祥佛 (Pinyin: Jíxiáng Fó)
- Korean: 길상불 (RR: Gilsang Bul)
- Thai: พระมังคลพุทธเจ้า; Phra Mangkhala Phutthachao
- Vietnamese: Phật Cát Tường

Information

Maṅgala Buddha is the sixth of twenty-seven Buddhas who preceded Gotama Buddha according to the Buddhavamsa, a text from the Theravada Pali canon, and its commentary. He was also the first Buddha of the Sāramaṇḍa kalpa.

In the Buddhavamsa, he is described as:

Maṅgala Buddha enlightens the dark world with the Dhamma torch. His rays are the most unusual among all Buddhas; they could even cover the light of the sun and the moon

Maṅgala Buddha was said to be 88 cubits, or 132 feet tall and his stupa was 30 yojana, or 229.2 miles high.

== Biography ==
=== Before birth ===
According to the Buddhavamsa, Maṅgala Buddha had practised pāramitā for 16 asaṃkhyeya and 100,000 (16×10^140 + 10^5) aeons to become a Buddha. During the gestation period, his mother, Queen Uttarā, is said to have glowed very brightly around a radius of 80 cubits, or 120 feet. Because of the light, she could travel at night without the use of other light sources.

=== From birth to enlightenment ===
According to the Buddhavamsa, Maṅgala Buddha was born in Uttara which was reigned by king Uttara. He was married to Queen Yasavadi and reigned the country for 9,000 years. His son was Sivala.

As soon as his son was born, he decided to leave the palace to practise asceticism. Three million servants followed him to become fellow ascetics. He practised for eight months. After practising for eight months, he left his servant ascetics and went to the Mesua ferrea tree. He began to practise peacefully under the tree and gained enlightenment the next morning.

== The rays of Maṅgala Buddha ==
The Buddhavamsa describes Maṅgala Buddha as having brighter rays than other Buddhas. His rays were said to be so bright that people could not determine whether it was day or night. Because of the rays, there were no sunlight or moonlight. Every object shined like gold during the presence of Maṅgala Buddha. There are two stories of Maṅgala Buddha's rays.

1. The incarnation of Maṅgala Buddha was asked to donate his children by a Biru named Kharadāṭhika who was disguised as a Brahmin. The incarnation happily donated his children to him. As soon as Kharadāṭhika ate them, he vomited the blood of the children. Without any anxiety, the incarnation said "Like this Biru vomiting such blood of bright color, my body shall shine very brightly".
2. Another incarnation of Maṅgala Buddha had a chance to see the stupa of a Buddha. After seeing the stupa, he said to himself "I must sacrifice my life for this Buddha". Then, he covered himself with butter and paid homage by performing the fire dancing for a whole night. He was not burnt, nor did he feel warm while paying homage.

== Disciples ==
The right-hand and left-hand disciples of Maṅgala Buddha were Arahant Sudeva and Arahant Dhammasena. His primary attendant was Palita. The female disciples were female Arahants Sīvalā and Asokā. The human disciples were the wealthy men, Nanda and Visakha and the women, Anulā and Sutanā.
