= Endodesmia =

Conservation status
- Least Concern (IUCN 3.1)

Scientific classification
- Kingdom: Plantae
- Clade: Tracheophytes
- Clade: Angiosperms
- Clade: Eudicots
- Clade: Rosids
- Order: Malpighiales
- Family: Calophyllaceae
- Genus: Endodesmia; Benth.
- Species: E. calophylloides

Binomial name
- Endodesmia calophylloides Benth.

Genus of flowering plants

Endodesmia calophylloides is a flowering plant species of the family Calophyllaceae and the sole species comprised in the genus Endodesmia. It is a shrub or tree native to southern Nigeria and west-central tropical Africa, including Cameroon, Gabon, Central African Republic, Republic of the Congo, and Democratic Republic of the Congo.
