= Clusiella =

Scientific classification
- Kingdom: Plantae
- Clade: Embryophytes
- Clade: Tracheophytes
- Clade: Spermatophytes
- Clade: Angiosperms
- Clade: Eudicots
- Clade: Rosids
- Order: Malpighiales
- Family: Calophyllaceae
- Genus: Clusiella; Planch. & Triana

Type species
- Clusiella elegans Planch. & Triana

Species
- eight; see text

Genus of flowering plants

Clusiella is a plant genus of the family Calophyllaceae. When Planchon and Triana first published it in 1860, based on Clusiella elegans, the genus was considered monotypic and remained as such for about 100 years.

This genus is confined to the Neotropics, occurring in Nicaragua, Costa Rica, Panama, Colombia, Venezuela, Ecuador, northern Peru, northern Brazil and Guyana.

== Species ==
Eight species are accepted:

- Clusiella albiflora Cuatrec.
- Clusiella amplexicaulis Cuatrec.
- Clusiella axillaris (Engl.) Cuatrec.
- Clusiella elegans Planch. & Triana
- Clusiella impressinervis Hammel
- Clusiella isthmensis Hammel
- Clusiella macropetala Cuatrec.
- Clusiella pendula Cuatrec.
