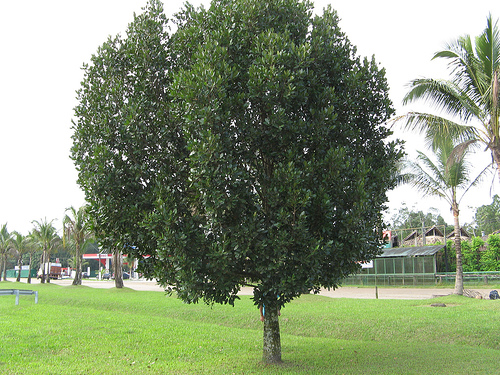
- Calophyllum brasiliense

Scientific classification
- Kingdom: Plantae
- Clade: Tracheophytes
- Clade: Angiosperms
- Clade: Eudicots
- Clade: Rosids
- Order: Malpighiales
- Family: Calophyllaceae; J.Agardh

Genera
- Calophyllum L.; Caraipa Aubl.; Clusiella Planch. & Triana; Endodesmia Benth.; Haploclathra Benth.; Kayea Wall.; Kielmeyera Mart.; Mahurea Aubl.; Mammea L.; Marila Sw.; Mesua L.; Neotatea Maguire; Poeciloneuron Bedd.

= Calophyllaceae =

Calophyllaceae Temporal range: Paleocene - recent

Family of flowering plants

Calophyllaceae is a family of flowering plants in the order Malpighiales and is recognized by the APG III system of classification. Most of the 14 genera and 475 species included in this family were previously recognized in the tribe Calophylleae of the family Clusiaceae. The Angiosperm Phylogeny Group determined that splitting this clade of genera off into their own family was necessary.
