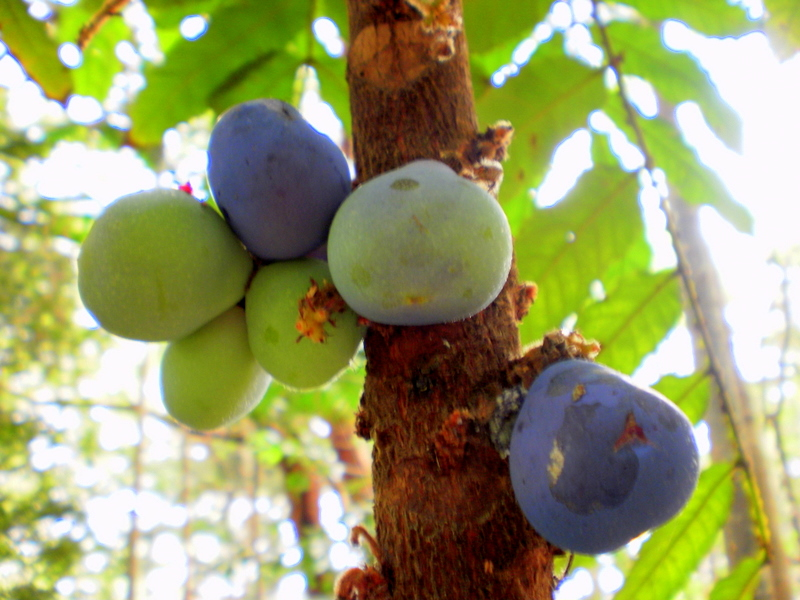

Scientific classification
- Kingdom: Plantae
- Clade: Tracheophytes
- Clade: Angiosperms
- Clade: Eudicots
- Clade: Rosids
- Order: Oxalidales
- Family: Cunoniaceae
- Genus: Davidsonia
- Species: D. jerseyana

Binomial name
- Davidsonia jerseyana (F.Muell. ex F.M.Bailey) G.J.Harden & J.B.Williams

= Davidsonia jerseyana =

Species of rainforest tree

Davidsonia jerseyana, also known as Davidson's plum or Mullumbimby plum, is a small, slender subtropical rainforest tree up to 10 metres (33 ft) high. The hairy leaves are compound and 35–60 cm (14–24 in) long, with 11–17 leaflets. It is endemic to a restricted area of northern New South Wales on the east coast of Australia. The tree's fruit emerge from the trunk, and superficially resemble the European plum.

It is considered an endangered species. There are two other species of Davidson's plum.

== Uses ==
It is cultivated for its pleasantly sour fruit which is used commercially in jam, wine, ice-cream and sauces.

The tree is propagated from seed and typically starts producing a crop by year four. It produces large crops of fruit from the trunk, and bagging is used to protect the fruit from sunburn and Australian king parrots. It likes protection from full sun and wind when young, adequate soil moisture, and good soil nutrition.

== See also ==
- Davidsonia johnsonii, Smooth Davidson's Plum
- Davidsonia pruriens, North Queensland Davidson's Plum
