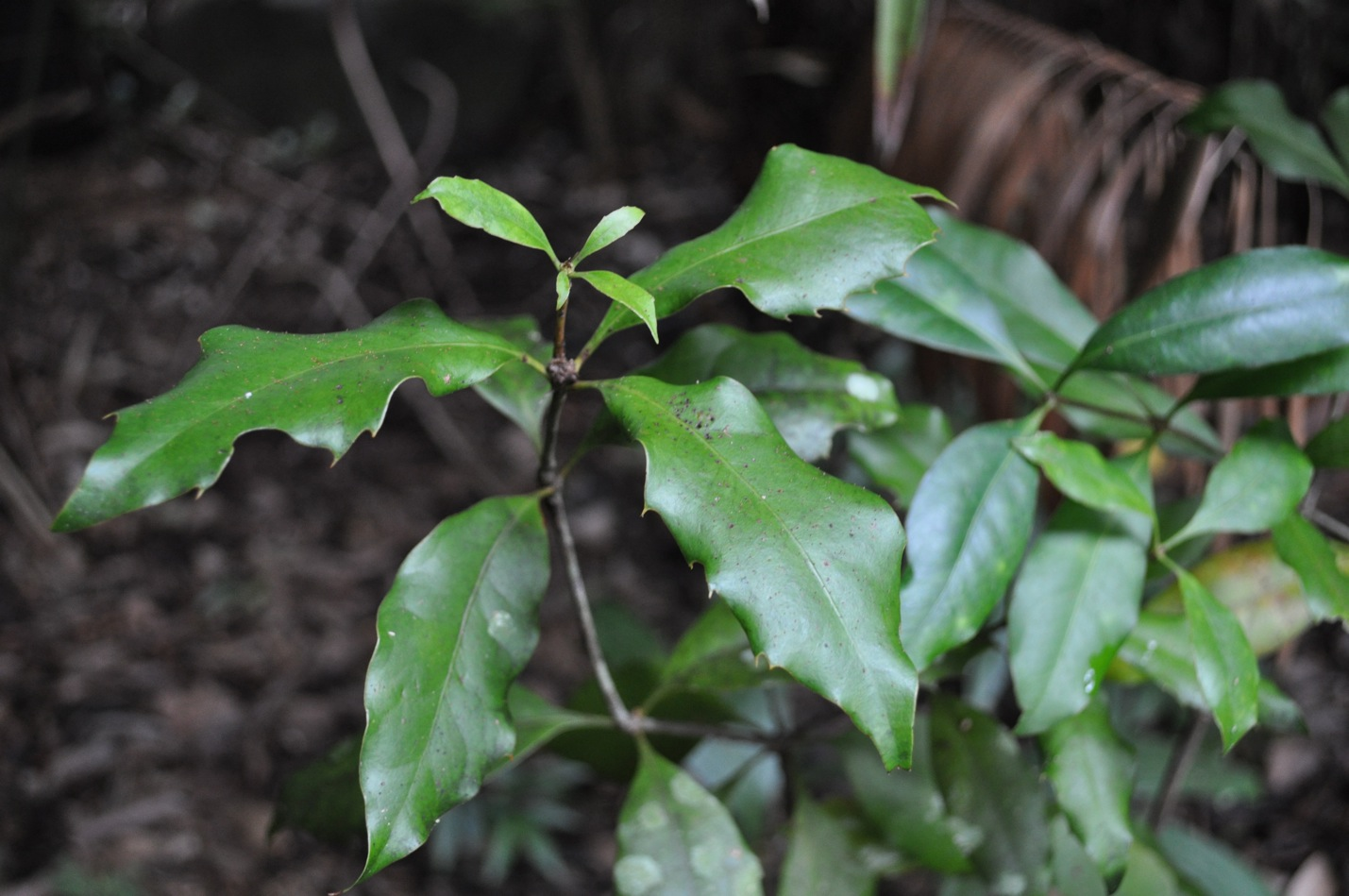
- Eidothea zoexylocarya leaves, Atherton CSIRO

Conservation status
- Vulnerable (EPBC Act)

Scientific classification
- Kingdom: Plantae
- Clade: Tracheophytes
- Clade: Angiosperms
- Clade: Eudicots
- Order: Proteales
- Family: Proteaceae
- Genus: Eidothea
- Species: E. zoexylocarya

Binomial name
- Eidothea zoexylocarya A.W.Douglas & B.Hyland

= Eidothea zoexylocarya =

Species of tree native to Australia

Eidothea zoexylocarya is a species of tall rainforest trees endemic to north-eastern Queensland, Australia, and constituting part of the plant family Proteaceae. These trees were only recognised in recent decades, first from the slopes of Mount Bartle Frere, the Queensland mountain which reaches the highest altitude. In 1995, scientific descriptions of the trees, as this genus and type species, were published for the first time by Andrew W. Douglas and Bernie Hyland. The species name refers to the almost identical fossil fruit Xylocaryon lockii F.Muell. (picture below), from Ballarat, southern Australia, still extant (zoe means life) in this north-eastern Australian species.

Eidothea zoexylocarya's rare, endemic, geographically isolated distribution has obtained the conservation status "vulnerable", officially listed in the regulation current as of 27 September 2013, of the Queensland government legislation, the Nature Conservation Act 1992.

== Description ==
The species grows naturally as trees up to 40 metres (130 ft) tall, with one main trunk, up to 80 cm (31 in) diameter at breast height and without the coppice shoots around the base typical of Eidothea hardeniana. They have ash–grey bark with pale lenticels.

They have mostly hairless, simple leaves 45–145×15–55 mm (1.77–5.71×0.59–2.17 in), arranged opposite to each other or in whorls of 3–8. E. zoexylocarya is the only known Proteaceae to possess giant cuticular pores in its leaves (diameter 1 μm, density 120000/mm^{2}), which could play a role in absorbing more water from mist after periods of water stress.

From September to May, flowering occurs in axillary or terminal clusters, 1.5–2 cm (0.6–0.8 in) long, of 6–10 flowers; each flower has white or cream perianth parts 8–9 mm (0.31–0.35 in) long, fragrant and insect pollinated.

The fruits have a globose or ovoid shape, green to yellowish or brown, 2.1–6.0 cm (0.83–2.36 in) long x 1.8–6.5 cm (0.7–2.6 in) wide and ripen from August–May. Each seed is contained in a hard woody brown endocarp with several longitudinal ribs on its inside corresponding to longitudinal intrusions in the seed surface. Giant white-tailed rats eat the seeds both on the tree and the ground. The hollowed-out woody endocarps often remain around the base of the parent tree as they break down slowly.

== Distribution and habitat ==
They grow naturally in rainforests from Mount Bartle Frere (headwaters of the Mulgrave River and Russell River) to Thornton Peak and Mount Pieter Botte (headwaters of the Bloomfield River), north-eastern Queensland. They grow naturally in soils derived from metamorphic or granitic geological parent materials, in complex mesophyll (leaf area) to simple notophyll vine forests, at altitude 430–1,480 m (1,410–4,860 ft) and have records from several conservation areas.

== Fruit picture ==
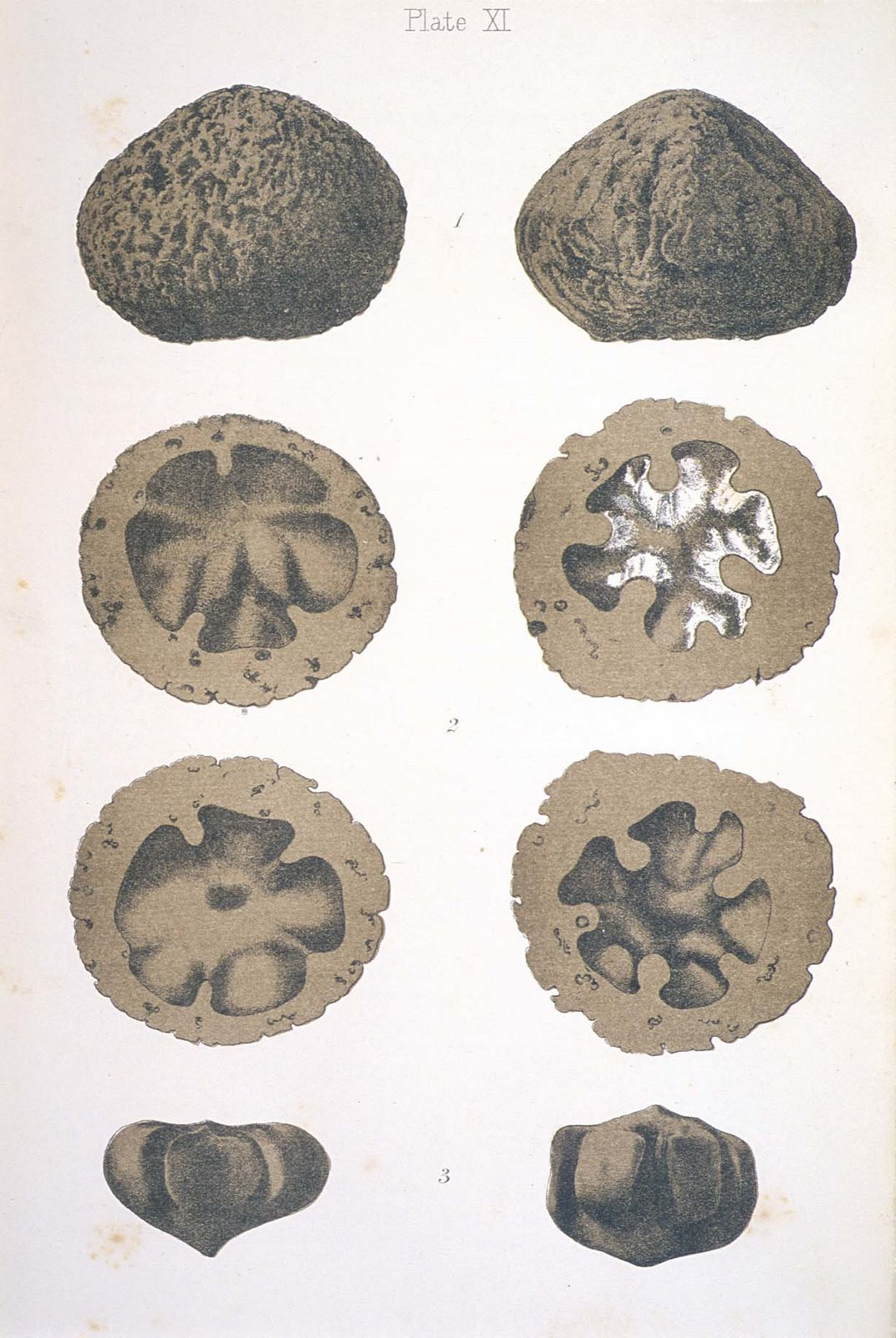
Xylocaryon lockii fossil nuts figured by Ferdinand von Mueller (1883)
