= Eidothea (disambiguation) =

Eidothea is a genus of rainforest plants.

Eidothea may also refer to:

- Eidothea (mythology), several women in Greek mythology
- Campylocephalus, a genus of eurypterid first described as Eidothea
