= Pimelea aquilonia =

Scientific classification
- Kingdom: Plantae
- Clade: Tracheophytes
- Clade: Angiosperms
- Clade: Eudicots
- Clade: Rosids
- Order: Malvales
- Family: Thymelaeaceae
- Genus: Pimelea
- Species: P. aquilonia

Binomial name
- Pimelea aquilonia Rye

Species of shrub

Pimelea aquilonia is a species of flowering plant in the family Thymelaeaceae and is endemic to far north Queensland. It is a shrub with narrowly elliptic leaves and small clusters of hairy, white or cream-coloured, tube-shaped flowers.

== Description ==
Pimelea aquilonia is a perennial shrub that typically grows to a height of 0.7–3 m (2 ft 4 in – 9 ft 10 in) and has shiny, densely hairy young stems. The leaves are narrowly elliptic, 8–35 mm (0.31–1.38 in) long and 2–7 mm (0.079–0.276 in) wide, on a short petiole. The flowers are borne in small clusters on the ends of branches, and are white or cream-coloured, densely covered with short, shiny hairs. The floral tube is 9–11.5 mm (0.35–0.45 in) long, the sepals 2.5–5 mm (0.098–0.197 in) long and glabrous on the inside. Flowering occurs from May to July.

== Taxonomy ==
Pimelea aquilonia was first formally described in 2017 by Barbara Lynette Rye in the Flora of Australia from specimens collected by Leonard John Brass on Cape York Peninsula in 1948.

== Distribution and habitat ==
This pimelea mainly grows in windswept, near-coastal shrubland, from the tip of Cape York Peninsula to 200 km (120 mi) further south, and possibly as far south as Mount Pieter Botte.
