= International Association for Plant Taxonomy =

Plant biodiversity organization

- Formation: July 18, 1950
- Headquarters: Bratislava, Slovakia
- President: Lúcia G. Lohmann
- Website: www.iaptglobal.org

The International Association for Plant Taxonomy (IAPT) is an organization established to promote an understanding of plant biodiversity, facilitate international communication of research between botanists, and oversee matters of uniformity and stability in plant names. The IAPT was founded on July 18, 1950, at the Seventh International Botanical Congress in Stockholm, Sweden. The IAPT headquarters is located in Bratislava, Slovakia. Its president, since 2023, is Lúcia G. Lohmann of the Universidade de São Paulo; vice-president is Fabián Michelangeli of the New York Botanical Garden; and secretary-general is Mauricio Bonifacino of the Universidad de la República, Montevideo, Uruguay.

Both the taxonomic journal Taxon and the series Regnum Vegetabile are published by the IAPT. The latter series includes the International Code of Nomenclature for algae, fungi, and plants, Index Nominum Genericorum, and Index Herbariorum.

== Purpose ==
The IAPT's primary purpose is the promotion and understanding of biodiversity—the discovery, naming, classification, and systematics of plants—for both living and fossil plants. Additionally, it promotes the study and conservation of plant biodiversity, and works to raise awareness of the general public about this issue. The organization also facilitates international cooperation among botanists working in the fields of plant systematics, taxonomy, and nomenclature. This is accomplished in part through sponsorship of meetings and publication of resources, such as reference publications and journals.

IAPT was founded in 1950 as a not-for-profit organisation for the purposes of publication of a periodical (Taxon) dealing with activities of the association and with objects of general importance for plant taxonomy, the publication of books and indices of utility for plant taxonomists (Regnum Vegetabile), the establishment and maintenance of committees for specific taxonomic and nomenclatural purposes, and the organization of international symposia on problems of plant systematics.

The IAPT also seeks to achieve uniformity and stability in plant names. It accomplishes this through the International Code of Nomenclature for algae, fungi, and plants, previously known as the International Code of Botanical Nomenclature, and through the oversight of the International Bureau for Plant Taxonomy and Nomenclature.

== Publications and online resources ==
The association's official journal is Taxon, the only medium for the publication of both proposals to conserve or reject names and proposals to amend the International Code of Nomenclature for algae, fungi, and plants.

=== Regnum Vegetabile ===
Regnum Vegetabile is a series of books on topics of interest to plant taxonomists. Many of the volumes are literature surveys or monographs in the area of plant systematics. There are several volumes of general use:

- International Code of Nomenclature for algae, fungi, and plants (vol. 159, 2018, ICN), a set of rules and recommendations dealing with the formal names that are given to plants. The current edition is known as the "Shenzhen Code", as it was drafted in 2017 at the Eighteenth International Botanical Congress in Shenzhen, China.
- International Code of Nomenclature for Cultivated Plants, 8th edition (vol. 151, 2010), a companion to the ICN that sets forth rules regarding the names of plant cultivars.
- Index Nominum Genericorum (vols. 100–102 & 113), an index of all published generic names covered by the ICN, including the place of publication and information about the type species. The index is prepared in collaboration with the Smithsonian Institution. An electronic version is available online.
- Index Herbariorum, the first six editions (vol. 15, 31, 86, 92, 93, 106, 109, 114, 117, 120), a directory and guide to the herbaria of the world, including contact information, abbreviation codes, and important collections located in each herbarium. Nowadays, the Index Herbariorum is an online database, managed by The New York Botanical Garden, and available for on-line searching.
- International Directory of Botanical Gardens (updated as vol. 95, 1977), a directory to botanical gardens and arboreta around the world.

The series includes many additional volumes of interest to specialists in specific subdisciplines of botany, in addition to the ones listed above.

=== Databases ===
In addition to electronic versions of its print publications, the IAPT maintains the "Names in Current Use", a database of scientific names of extant botanical genera.

== Awards ==
The IAPT established two Engler Medals in honour of Adolf Engler in 1986: the Engler Medal in Gold awarded every six years for outstanding lifetime contributions to plant taxonomy and presented since 1987 at each International Botanical Congress (IBC), and the Engler Medal in Silver (medal sensu lato) awarded from 1987 to 2001 for a monograph or other work in systematic botany and presented from 1990 to 2002 at various meetings, congresses, symposia, etc. In 2002 the latter medal was divided into three awards for outstanding publications in these areas: the Engler Medal in Silver (medal sensu stricto) awarded for monographic or floristic plant systematics; the Stafleu Medal awarded for historical, bibliographic, and/or nomenclatural aspects of plant systematics; and the Stebbins Medal awarded for phylogenetic plant systematics and/or plant evolution. The medals honor Adolf Engler (24 March 1844–10 October 1930), Frans Antonie Stafleu (8 September 1921–16 December 1997), and George Ledyard Stebbins, Jr. (6 January 1906–19 January 2000).
