= Peter F. Stevens =

British botanist (born 1944)

Peter Francis Stevens
- Born: 1944 (age 81–82); United Kingdom
- Education: Oxford University
- Known for: APG
- Spouse: Elizabeth Anne Kellogg
- Scientific career
- Fields: Botany
- Institutions: Missouri Botanical Garden; University of Missouri–St. Louis
- Doctoral students: Lúcia G. Lohmann
- Author abbrev. (botany): P.F.Stevens

Peter Francis Stevens (born 1944) is a British botanist. He is a researcher at the Missouri Botanical Garden and a professor of biology of the University of Missouri–St. Louis. He is a member of the Angiosperm Phylogeny Group which created the APG, APG II, APG III, and APG IV systems.

He maintains a web site, APweb, hosted by the Missouri Botanical Garden, which has been regularly updated since 2001, and is a useful source for the latest research in angiosperm phylogeny which follows the APG approach.

The standard author abbreviation P.F.Stevens is used to indicate this person as the author when citing a botanical name. He has named dozens of species, mostly in the families Clusiaceae and Ericaceae, and he also described the genus Romnalda (Asparagaceae).
