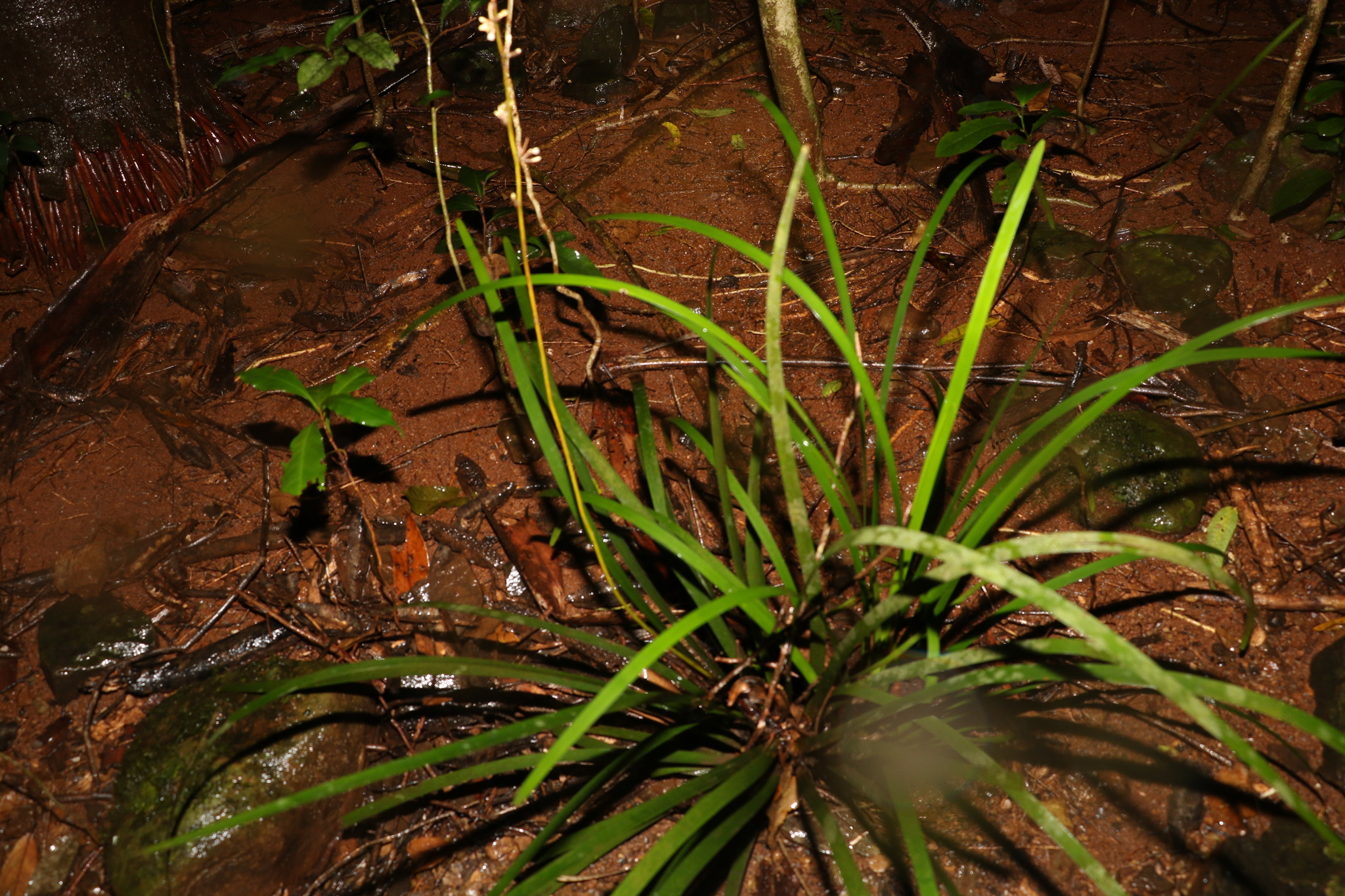
- Romnalda strobilacea

Scientific classification
- Kingdom: Plantae
- Clade: Tracheophytes
- Clade: Angiosperms
- Clade: Monocots
- Order: Asparagales
- Family: Asparagaceae
- Subfamily: Lomandroideae
- Genus: Romnalda; P.F.Stevens

= Romnalda =

Genus of plants

Romnalda is a genus of monocotyledonous plants in the family Asparagaceae, subfamily Lomandroideae. (They have also been placed in the Xanthorrhoeaceae.) As of December 2013 four formally named species are known and accepted by botanical science.

The name Romnalda is an anagram of Lomandra, a related though more common genus of hard–leaved lily-like plants. The genus Romnalda differs from Lomandra in growing exclusively in rainforests and having sparsely branched inflorescences with no spines.

Plants have strap-like leaves and grow up to one metre (3 feet) tall often with a trunk and stilt roots reminiscent of a miniature Pandanus. Species of Romnalda grow naturally in Queensland and Papua New Guinea.

== Species ==
- R. grallata – restricted to cloud forests on a few misty peaks in the Daintree Rainforest, Wet Tropics region, north-eastern Queensland.
- R. ophiopogonoides, synonym: Romnalda sp. Cooper Creek (P.I.Forster+ PIF4402) Qld Herbarium – only found in a few isolated locations around Cooper Creek, Wet Tropics region, north-eastern Queensland; and has obtained the Queensland government's official conservation status listing of "vulnerable" species.
- R. papuana – only found in a handful of locations in Papua New Guinea including the island of New Britain.
- R. strobilacea – restricted to basaltic soils north of Brisbane in South East Queensland, Australia; and has obtained the Australian national and Queensland governments' official conservation status listings of "vulnerable" species.
