= Elizabeth Anne Kellogg =

American botanist

- Born: 1951 (age 74–75)
- Education: Harvard University
- Spouse: Peter F. Stevens
- Scientific career
- Fields: Botany, Plant systematics
- Workplaces: University of Missouri–St. Louis; Donald Danforth Plant Science Center
- Doctoral students: Lúcia G. Lohmann
- Author abbrev. (botany): E.A.Kellogg

Elizabeth Anne Kellogg (born 1951) is an American botanist who works mainly on grasses and cereals, both wild and cultivated. She earned a Ph.D. from Harvard University in 1983, and was professor of Botanical Studies at the University of Missouri–St. Louis from 1998 to 2013. Since 2013 she has been a principal investigator at the Donald Danforth Plant Science Center in Missouri. In 2020 she was elected a member of the National Academy of Sciences, and she is also a fellow of the Academia Nacional de Ciencias, Argentina. In July 2024, Kellogg was a speaker for the International Botanical Congress in Madrid, Spain.

She is married to Peter Francis Stevens.

== Taxonomic contributions ==
Kellogg is the author of numerous plant taxa, particularly within the grass family (Poaceae), and her standard author abbreviation is The standard author abbreviation E.A.Kellogg is used to indicate this person as the author when citing a botanical name.

She has described species such as Tripidium arundinaceum and contributed broadly to the systematics and phylogeny of grasses.

== Publications ==
=== Books ===
- Judd, W.S.; Campbell, C.S.; Kellogg, E.A.; Stevens, P.F.; Donoghue, M.J. (2016). Plant systematics a phylogenetic approach (4 ed.). MA, USA: Sinauer Associates Inc. ISBN 978-1-60535-389-0.
- Kellogg, E.A. (2015). Flowering plants. Monocots: Poaceae. Elsevier. doi:10.1007/978-3-319-15332-2. ISBN 978-3-319-15331-5. S2CID 30485589.
- Grotewold, E.; Chappell, J.; Kellogg, E.A.; American Society of Plant Biologists (2015). Plant genes, genomes, and genetics. Chichester, West Sussex: John Wiley & Sons. ISBN 978-1-119-99888-4.

=== Articles ===
- Petersen, K. B.; Kellogg, E. A. (2022). Diverse ecological functions and the convergent evolution of grass awns. American Journal of Botany. 109 (9): 1331–1345. doi:10.1002/ajb2.16060.
- Yu, Y.; Hu, H.; Doust, A.N.; Kellogg, E.A. (2019). "Divergent gene expression networks underlie morphological diversity of abscission zones in grasses". New Phytologist. 225 (4): 1799–1815. doi:10.1111/nph.16087. ISSN 0028-646X. PMC 7003853. PMID 31372996.
- Kellogg, E.A. (2019). "Different ways to be redundant". Nature Genetics. 51 (5): 770–771. doi:10.1038/s41588-019-0406-y. ISSN 1061-4036. PMID 31043751. S2CID 141528386.
- Welker, C.A.D.; McKain, M.R.; Vorontsova, M.S.; Peichoto, Myriam C.; Kellogg, E.A. (2019). "Plastome phylogenomics of sugarcane and relatives confirms the segregation of the genus Tripidium (Poaceae: Andropogoneae)". Taxon. 68 (2): 246–267. doi:10.1002/tax.12030. ISSN 0040-0262. S2CID 195381265.
- Kumar, D.; Kellogg, E.A. (2019). "Getting closer: vein density in C4 leaves". New Phytologist. 221 (3): 1260–1267. doi:10.1111/nph.15491. ISSN 0028-646X. PMID 30368826.
- McAllister, C.A.; McKain, M.R.; Li, M.; Bookout, B.; Kellogg, E.A. (2018). "Specimen-based analysis of morphology and the environment in ecologically dominant grasses: the power of the herbarium". Philosophical Transactions of the Royal Society B: Biological Sciences. 374 (1763) 20170403. doi:10.1098/rstb.2017.0403. ISSN 0962-8436. PMC 6282083. PMID 30455217.
- Kellogg, E.A. (2009). "The Evolutionary History of Ehrhartoideae, Oryzeae, and Oryza". Rice. 2: 1–14. doi:10.1007/s12284-009-9022-2.
- Kellogg, E.A. (2015). "Brachypodium distachyon as a Genetic Model System". Annual Review of Genetics. 49 (1): 1–20. doi:10.1146/annurev-genet-112414-055135. ISSN 0066-4197. PMID 26393966.
- Zhong, J.; Kellogg, E.A. (2015). "Duplication and expression of CYC2-like genes in the origin and maintenance of corolla zygomorphy in Lamiales". New Phytologist. 205 (2): 852–868. doi:10.1111/nph.13104. ISSN 0028-646X. PMID 25329857.
- Kellogg, E.A. (2015). "Genome sequencing: Long reads for a short plant". Nature Plants. 1 (12): 15169. doi:10.1038/nplants.2015.169. ISSN 2055-0278. PMID 27251714.
- Welker, C.A.D.; Souza-Chies, T.T.; Longhi-Wagner, H.M.; Peichoto, M.C.; McKain, M.R.; Kellogg, E.A. (2015). "Phylogenetic analysis of Saccharum s.l. (Poaceae; Andropogoneae), with emphasis on the circumscription of the South American species". American Journal of Botany. 102 (2): 248–263. doi:10.3732/ajb.1400397. ISSN 0002-9122. PMID 25667078.
- Zhong, J.; Kellogg, E.A. (2015). "Stepwise evolution of corolla symmetry in CYCLOIDEA2-like and RADIALIS-like gene expression patterns in Lamiales". American Journal of Botany. 102 (8): 1260–1267. doi:10.3732/ajb.1500191. ISSN 0002-9122. PMID 26290549.
- Osborne, C.P.; Salomaa, A.; Kluyver, T.A.; Visser, V.; Kellogg, E.A.; Morrone, O.; Vorontsova, M.S.; Clayton, W.D.; Simpson, D.A. (2014). "A global database of C4 photosynthesis in grasses". New Phytologist. 204 (3): 441–446. doi:10.1111/nph.12942. hdl:10019.1/122719. ISSN 0028-646X. PMID 25046685.
- Estep, M.C.; McKain, M.R.; Vela Diaz, D.; Zhong, J.; Hodge, J.G.; Hodkinson, T.R.; Layton, D.J.; Malcomber, S.T.; Pasquet, R.; Kellogg, E.A. (2014). "Allopolyploidy, diversification, and the Miocene grassland expansion". Proceedings of the National Academy of Sciences. 111 (42): 15149–15154. Bibcode:2014PNAS..11115149E. doi:10.1073/pnas.1404177111. ISSN 0027-8424. PMC 4210326. PMID 25288748.
- Welker, C.A.D.; Kellogg, E.A.; Prado, J. (2014). "Andropogoneae versus Sacchareae (Poaceae: Panicoideae): The end of a great controversy". Taxon. 63 (3): 643–646. doi:10.12705/633.5. ISSN 0040-0262.
- Layton, D.J.; Kellogg, E.A. (2014). "Morphological, phylogenetic, and ecological diversity of the new model species Setaria viridis (Poaceae: Paniceae) and its close relatives". American Journal of Botany. 101 (3): 539–557. doi:10.3732/ajb.1300428. ISSN 0002-9122. PMID 24634437.
- Hodge, J.G.; Kellogg, E.A. (2014). "Patterns of Inflorescence Development of Three Prairie Grasses (Andropogoneae, Poaceae)". International Journal of Plant Sciences. 175 (9): 963–974. doi:10.1086/677652. ISSN 1058-5893. S2CID 84708781.
- Huang, P.; Feldman, M.; Schroder, S.; Bahri, B.A.; Diao, X.; Zhi, H.; Estep, M.; Baxter, I.; Devos, K.M.; Kellogg, E.A. (2014). "Population genetics of Setaria viridis, a new model system". Molecular Ecology. 23 (20): 4912–4925. doi:10.1111/mec.12907. ISSN 0962-1083. PMID 25185718. S2CID 19065573.
- Christin, P.-A.; Edwards, E.J.; Besnard, G.; Boxall, S.F.; Gregory, R.; Kellogg, E.A.; Hartwell, J.; Osborne, C.P. (2012). "Adaptive Evolution of C4 Photosynthesis through Recurrent Lateral Gene Transfer". Current Biology. 22 (5): 445–449. doi:10.1016/j.cub.2012.01.054. ISSN 0960-9822. PMID 22342748.
- Kellogg, Elizabeth Anne (1 August 2024). "A sharp discovery". Science.
