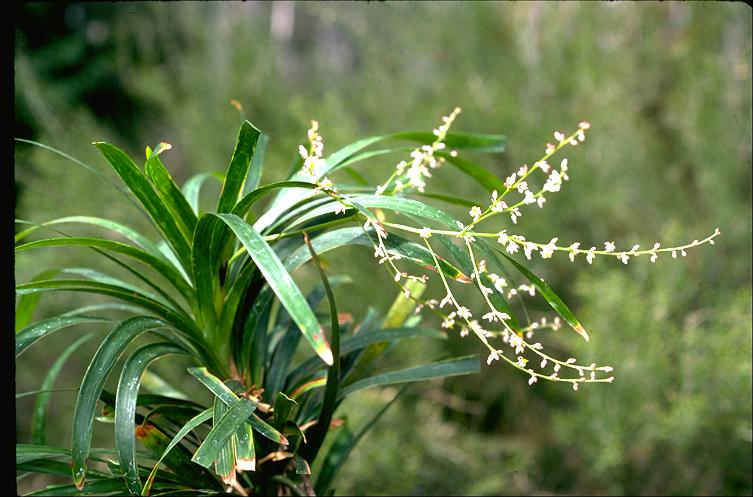
- A flowering specimen

Conservation status
- Least Concern (NCA)

Scientific classification
- Kingdom: Plantae
- Clade: Tracheophytes
- Clade: Angiosperms
- Clade: Monocots
- Order: Asparagales
- Family: Asparagaceae
- Subfamily: Lomandroideae
- Genus: Romnalda
- Species: R. grallata

Binomial name
- Romnalda grallata R.J.H.Hend.

= Romnalda grallata =

Species of flowering plant

Romnalda grallata is a species of plant in the asparagus family Asparagaceae endemic to a small part of the Wet Tropics bioregion of Queensland, Australia. It was first described in 1982 and has a conservation status of least concern.

== Description ==
=== Stem and foliage ===
Romnalda grallata is a perennial herb up to 40 cm (16 in) tall, with a slim stem up to 8 mm (0.31 in) thick. The stem may lay on the ground or grow upright, and it often produces stilt roots up to 20 cm (7.9 in) long. The leaves tightly clustered towards the end of each stem, and arranged alternately in two spirals. They measure up to 35 cm (14 in) long but only about 16 mm (0.63 in) wide, and may be curved slightly left or right. The leaf blade terminates with 3–8 small teeth.

=== Flowers ===
The inflorescence is a panicle up to 29 cm (11 in) long with few branches carrying clusters of small flowers. Each flower has six tepals in two whorls of three, the tepals white (sometimes marked with purple) and about 4 mm (0.16 in) long. The flowers are 'perfect', i.e. they have both male and female parts; there are six stamens about 2 mm (0.08 in) long, and the ovary contains three chambers, each with two ovules. The style is about 3.5 mm (0.14 in) long.

=== Fruit ===
The fruit is a yellow-orange capsule about 10 mm (0.39 in) long, with three segments, each with nil, one or (rarely) two seeds.

== Conservation ==
This species is listed as least concern under the Queensland Government's Nature Conservation Act. As of October 2025, it has not been assessed by the International Union for Conservation of Nature (IUCN).
