= Lúcia G. Lohmann =

Brazilian botanist

- Born: Brazil
- Education: University of São Paulo; University of Missouri–St. Louis
- Scientific career
- Fields: Botany, conservation
- Workplaces: University of São Paulo; New York Botanical Garden; Missouri Botanical Garden; University of California, Berkeley; Washington University in St. Louis
- Doctoral advisor: Elizabeth Anne Kellogg; Peter F. Stevens

Lúcia Garcez Lohmann is a Brazilian botanist specialized in neotropical biodiversity, with an emphasis on plant ecology and evolution in the Amazon Basin. She is President of the Missouri Botanical Garden and George Engelmann Professor Botany at Washington University in St. Louis.

== Early life and education ==
Lohmann was born in Brazil. She completed her undergraduate degree in biological sciences at the University of São Paulo (USP) in 1995. Her undergraduate thesis focused on the Bignoniaceae family from the Serra do Cipó in Minas Gerais. She investigated the documenting the biodiversity of the Amazon Basin.

Lohmann continued her studies at the University of Missouri–St. Louis, where she earned a master's degree in tropical biology and conservation in 1998 and a Ph.D. in ecology, evolution, and systematics in 2003. Her doctoral research examined the biogeography and evolutionary history of the trumpet-creeper plant family, Bignoniaceae. Her dissertation was titled, Phylogeny, Classification, Morphological Diversification and Biogeography of Bignonieae (Bignoniaceae, Lamiales). Elizabeth A. Kellogg and Peter F. Stevens were her doctoral advisors.

Lohmann completed postdoctoral research at the Missouri Botanical Garden's Center for Conservation and Sustainable Development in 2004. During this period, she utilized the Garden's Herbarium specimens and geospatial tools to address various evolutionary, ecological, and conservation challenges. Her work contributed to advancing the understanding of plant species' distribution and evolution, with a particular emphasis on conservation strategies for endangered species.

== Career ==
Lohmann has pursued an academic career with a focus on botany, particularly in taxonomy, phylogenetics, and conservation biology. In 2004, she joined the department of botany at the University of São Paulo as a professor, where she remained active until 2023. Lohmann's research interests include the systematics and biogeography of Neotropical plants, with a particular focus on the Bignonieae tribe. Her work combines taxonomic, ecological, and phylogenetic data to better understand the diversification of Neotropical biotas. Lohmann has contributed to several research projects, including work on the biodiversity and conservation of Amazonian plants, the digitization of botanical collections, and the systematics of Bignoniaceae.

Lohmann has collaborated with various institutions, serving as an associate researcher at the Missouri Botanical Garden since 2004 and at the New York Botanical Garden since 2008. She also held leadership roles within scientific organizations, including serving as the executive director of the Association for Tropical Biology and Conservation since 2019 and as president of the International Association for Plant Taxonomy since 2023. In 2021, Lohmann was elected an international honorary member of the American Academy of Arts and Sciences in the biological sciences area, evolution and ecology speciality. In July 2023, she became the director of the herbaria at the University of California, Berkeley and a professor in the department of integrative biology. At UCB, her research has remained focused on neotropical biodiversity, with an emphasis on plant ecology and evolution in the Amazon Basin.

In 2024, after an international search, Lohmann was selected to succeed Peter Wyse Jackson as the president of the Missouri Botanical Garden, a role she assumed in January 2025. She is the eighth president in the Missouri Botanical Garden’s 165-year history and the first woman to hold the position. In addition, she is the George Engelmann Professor of Botany at Washington University in St. Louis.
