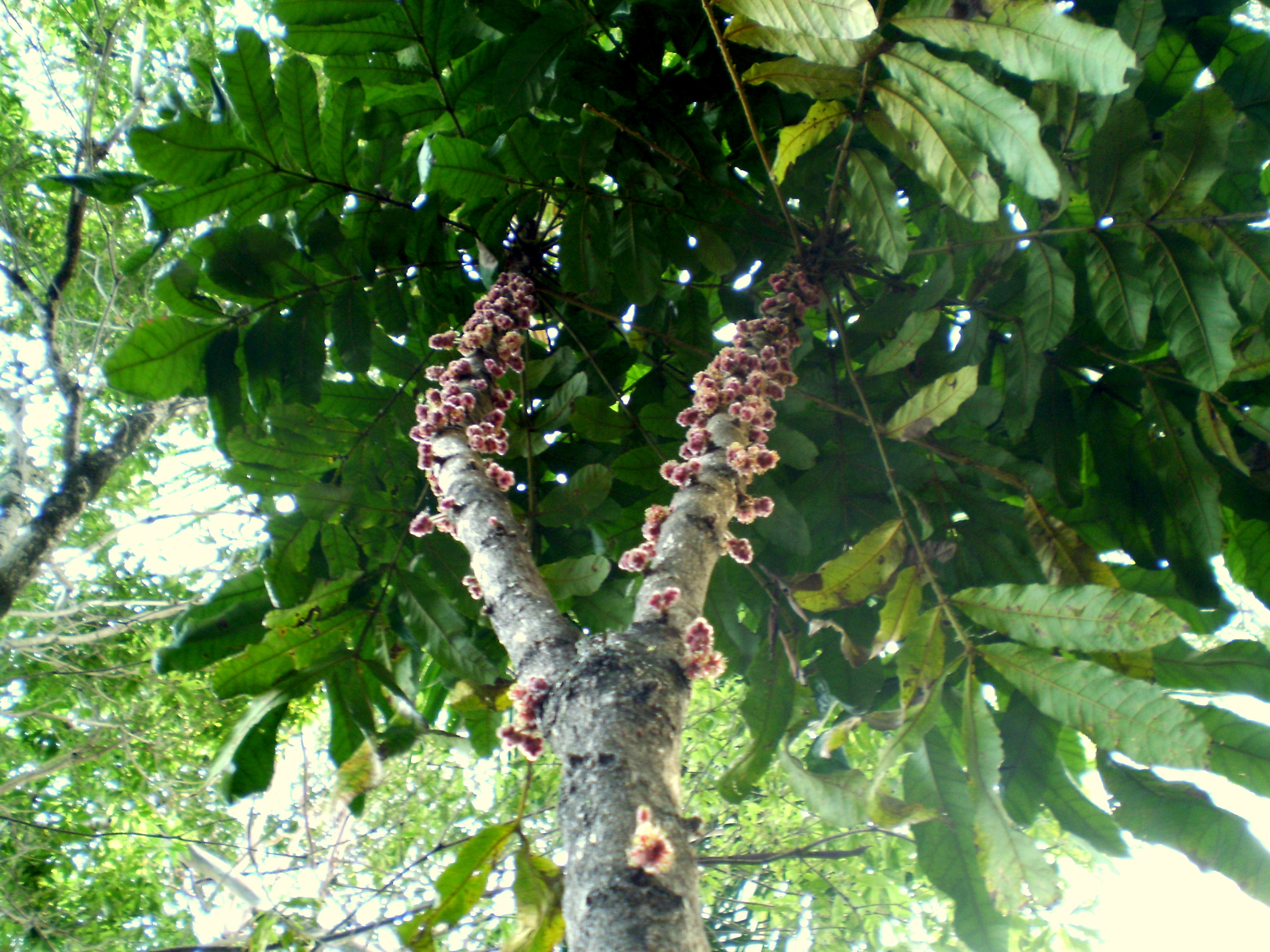
- Davidsonia jerseyana

Scientific classification
- Kingdom: Plantae
- Clade: Tracheophytes
- Clade: Angiosperms
- Clade: Eudicots
- Clade: Rosids
- Order: Oxalidales
- Family: Cunoniaceae
- Genus: Davidsonia; F.Muell

= Davidsonia =

Genus of rainforest trees

Davidsonia is a genus containing three rainforest tree species native to Australia, commonly known as the Davidson plum or Davidson's plum. The fruits superficially resemble the European plum, but are not closely related. All species have an edible sour fruit with burgundy-coloured flesh and are highly regarded as gourmet bushfood. The genus Davidsonia is named after John Ewen Davidson who claimed the land from which the tree was first botanically described.

- Davidsonia jerseyana, Davidson's plum or Mullumbimby plum, is a slender small tree, generally 5 metres high, native to lowland subtropical rainforests of New South Wales. It is considered an endangered species in the wild, but is widely cultivated for its pleasantly sour fruit that is used in jam, wine, ice-cream and sauces.
- Davidsonia johnsonii, smooth Davidson's plum, is a small tree with a spreading canopy and smooth leaves, native to New South Wales and southeast Queensland. It is also considered an endangered species in the wild but is not widely cultivated because of its infertile seeds. It is propagated vegetatively from cuttings or root division.
- Davidsonia pruriens, Ooray or Queensland Davidson's plum, is a taller tree than the other two species, reaching up to 12 metres high. It is also slender and has larger fruit which are produced in large clusters from the trunk or branches.

Small-scale plantations in New South Wales and Queensland supply the demand, mainly from Davidsonia jerseyana and Davidsonia pruriens.

== Gallery ==
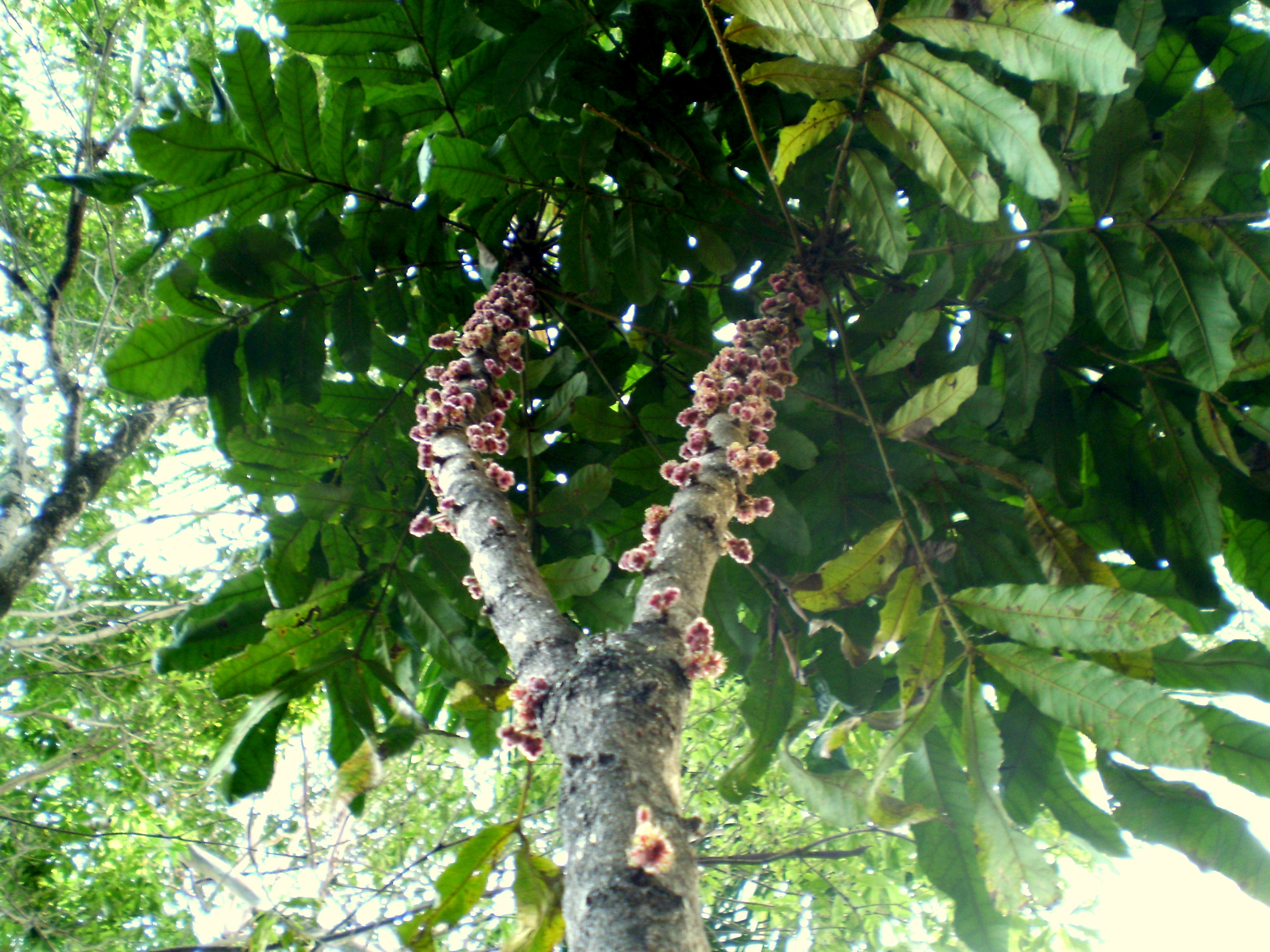
Davidsonia jerseyana, Davidson's Plum, flower & trunk.

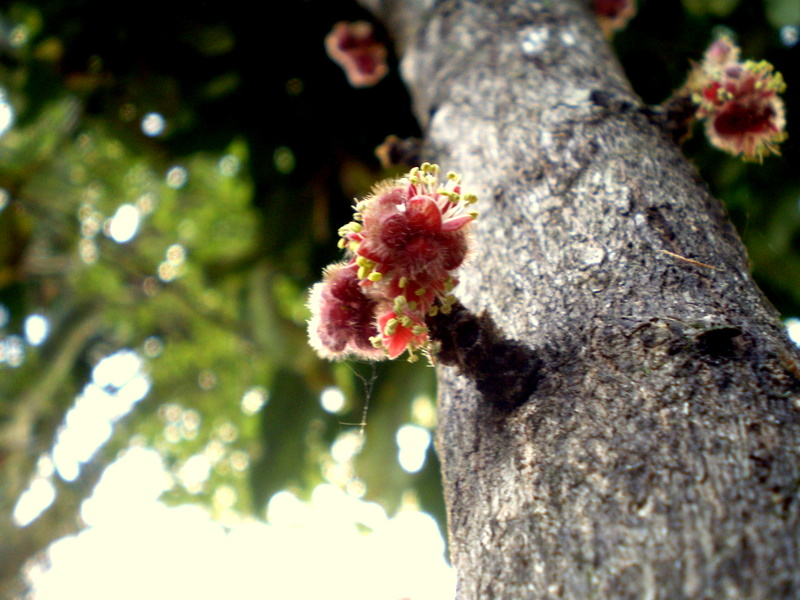
Davidsonia jerseyana flower & trunk, Nimbin, New South Wales, Australia.

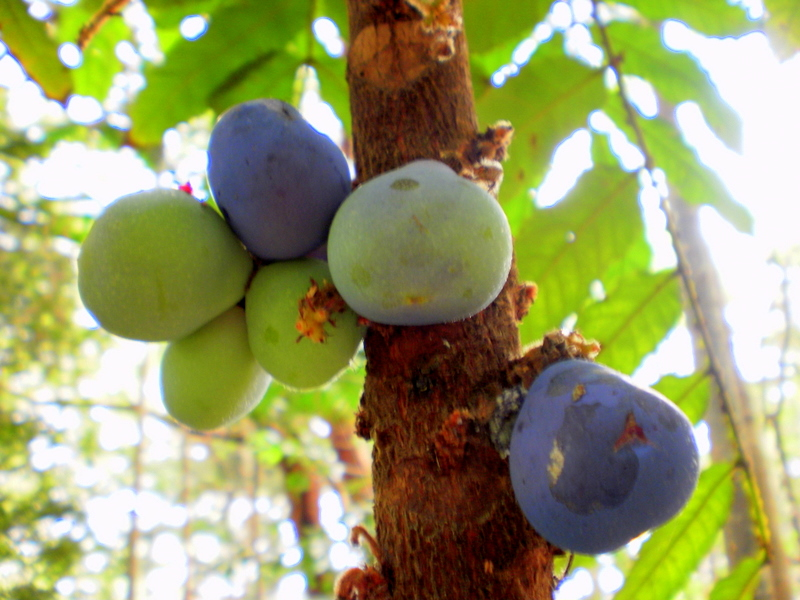
Davidsonia jerseyana, Davidson's plum, Nimbin, New South Wales, Australia.

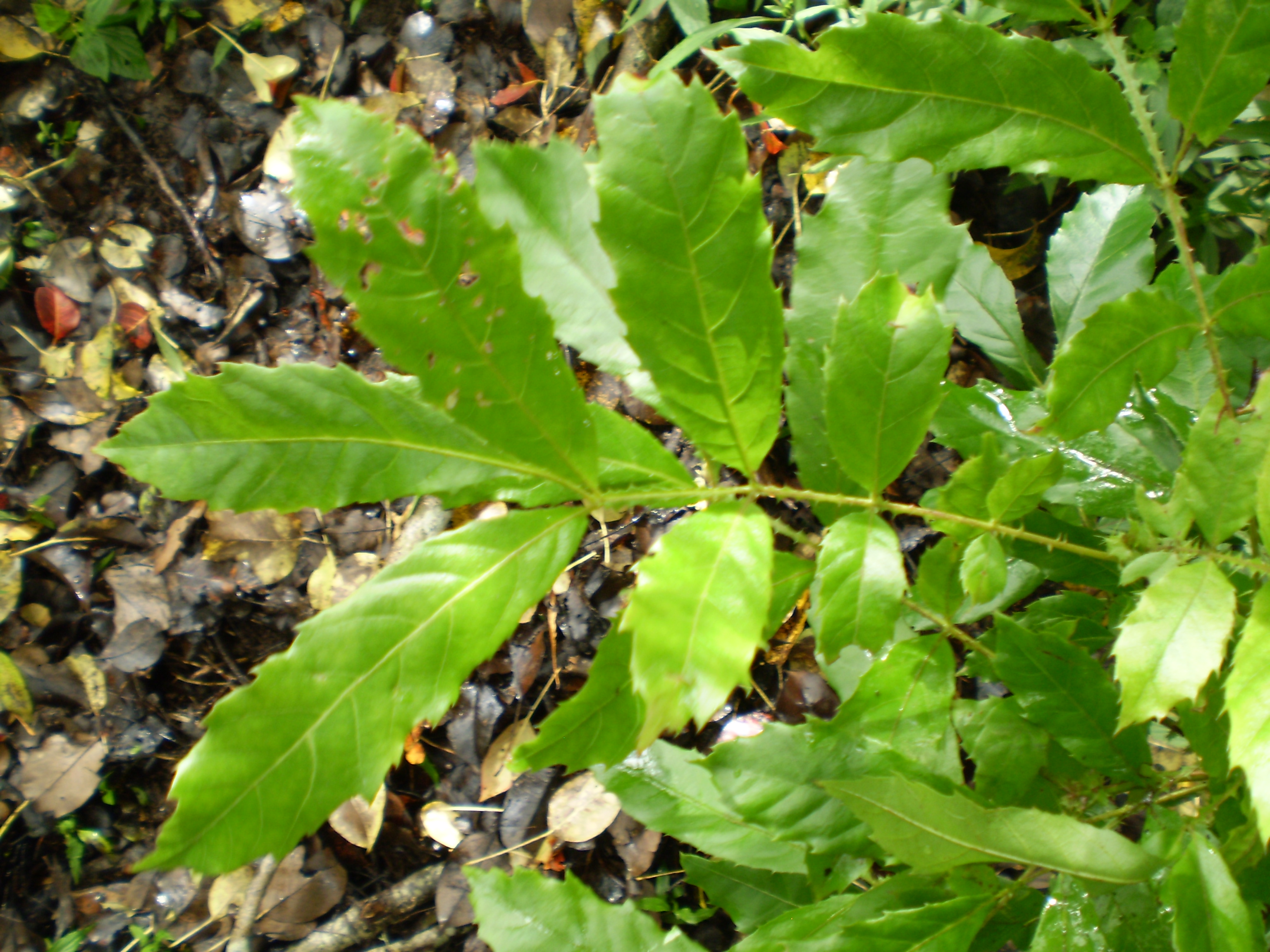
Davidsonia johnsonii leaf, smooth Davidson's plum. Cultivated tree Northern NSW, Australia.

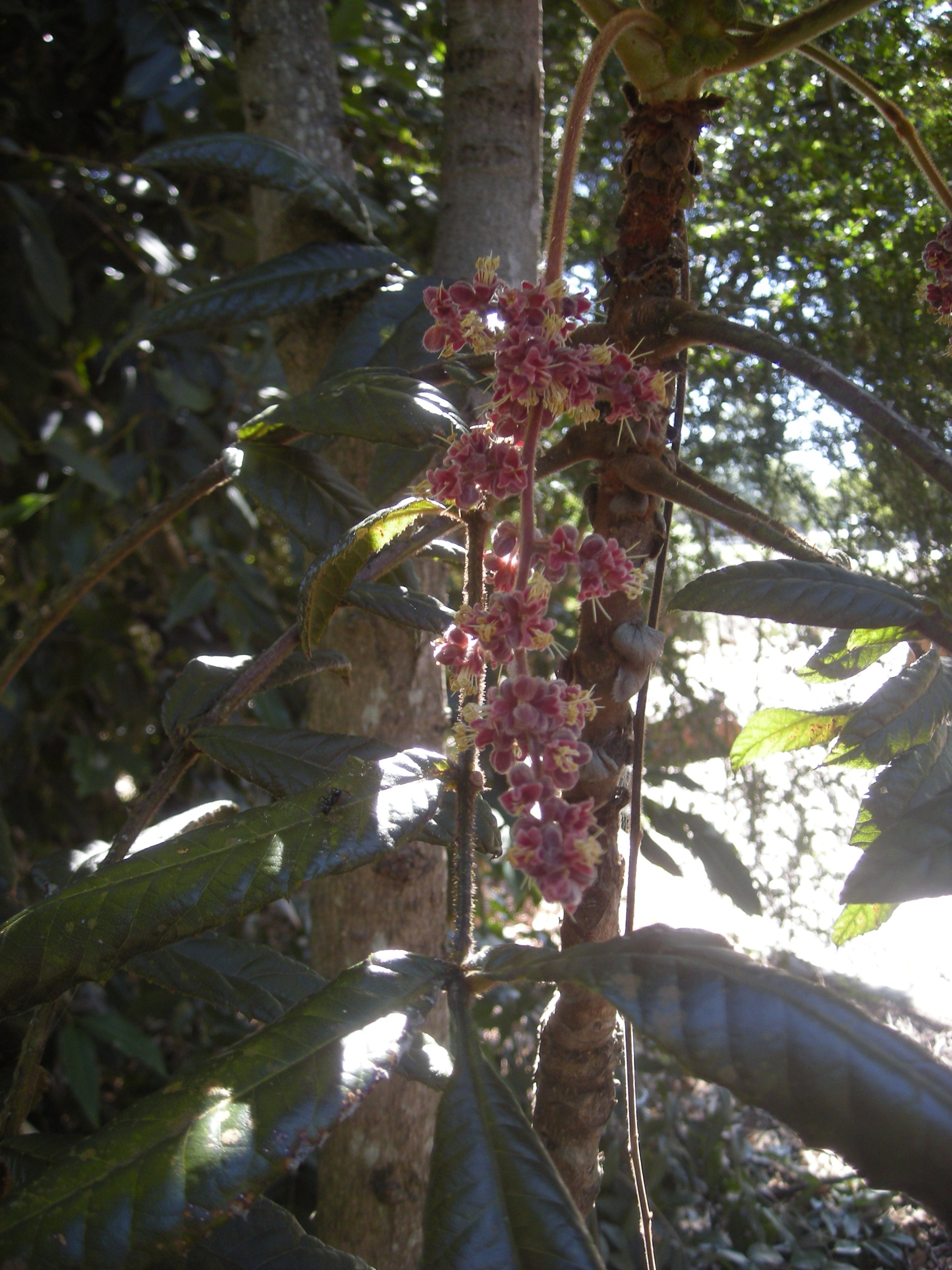
Davidsonia pruriens flowers

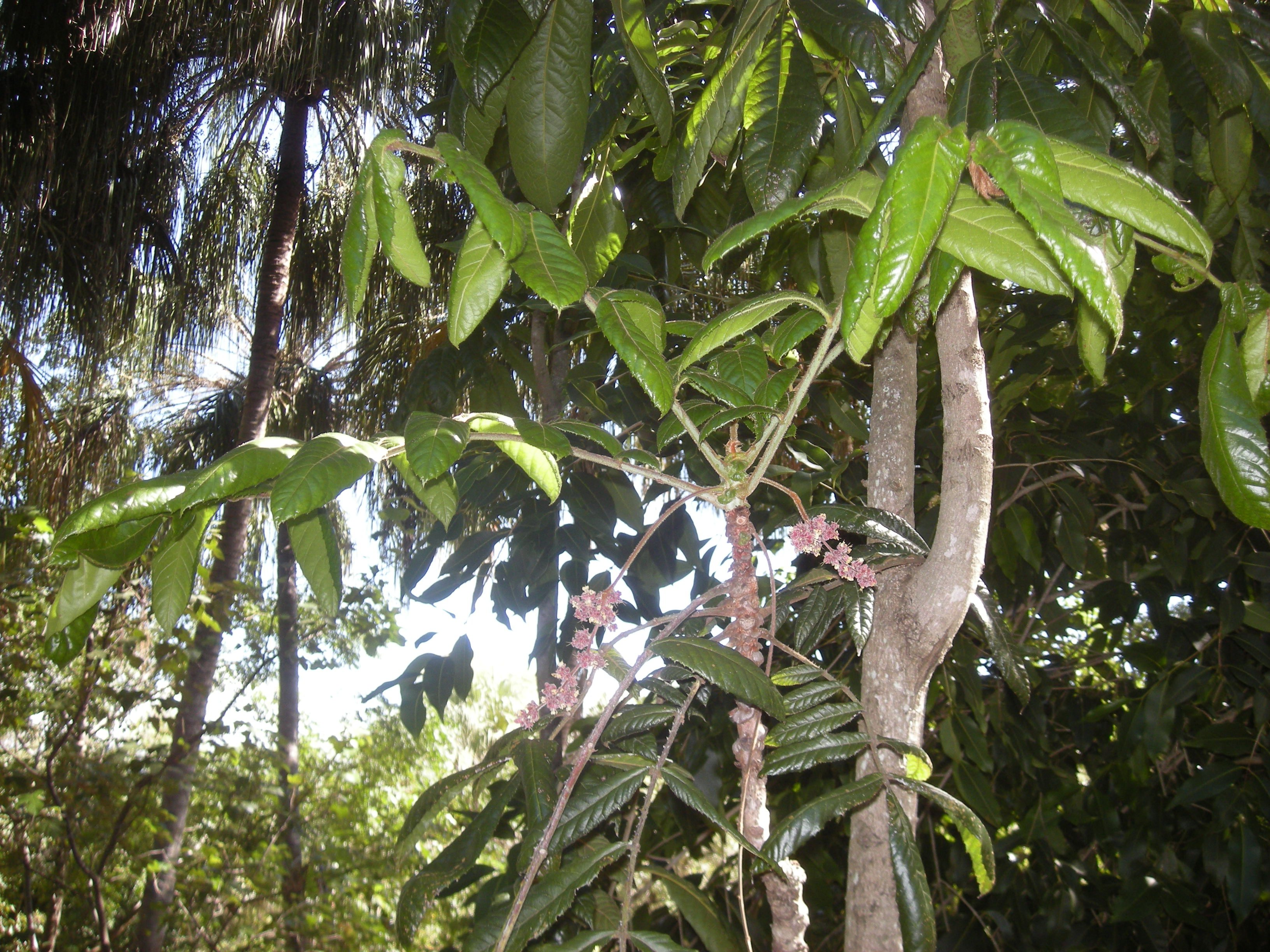
Davidsonia pruriens flowers and foliage

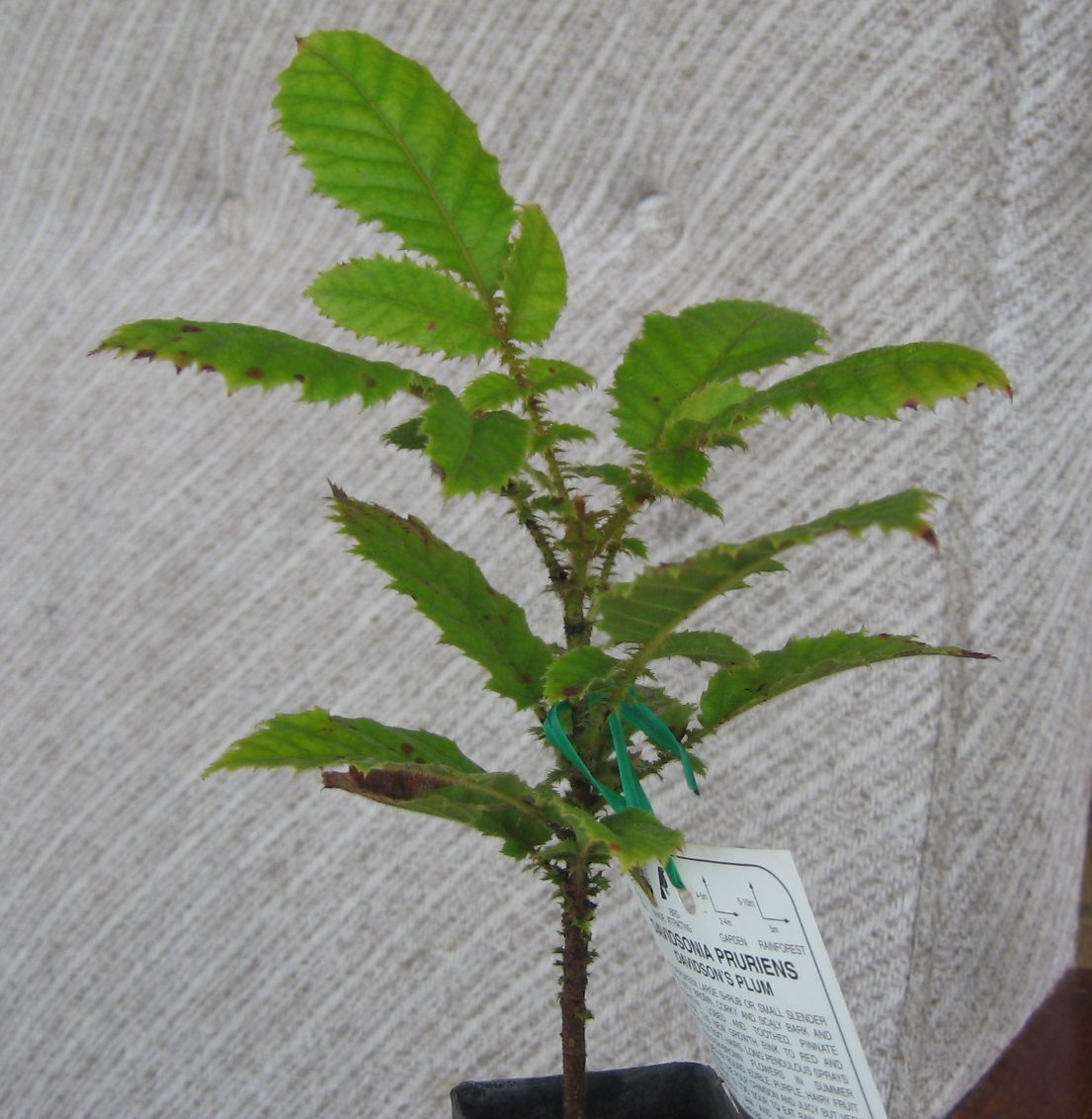
Davidson's plum seedling, Davidsonia pruriens - showing its characteristic toothed leaves.
