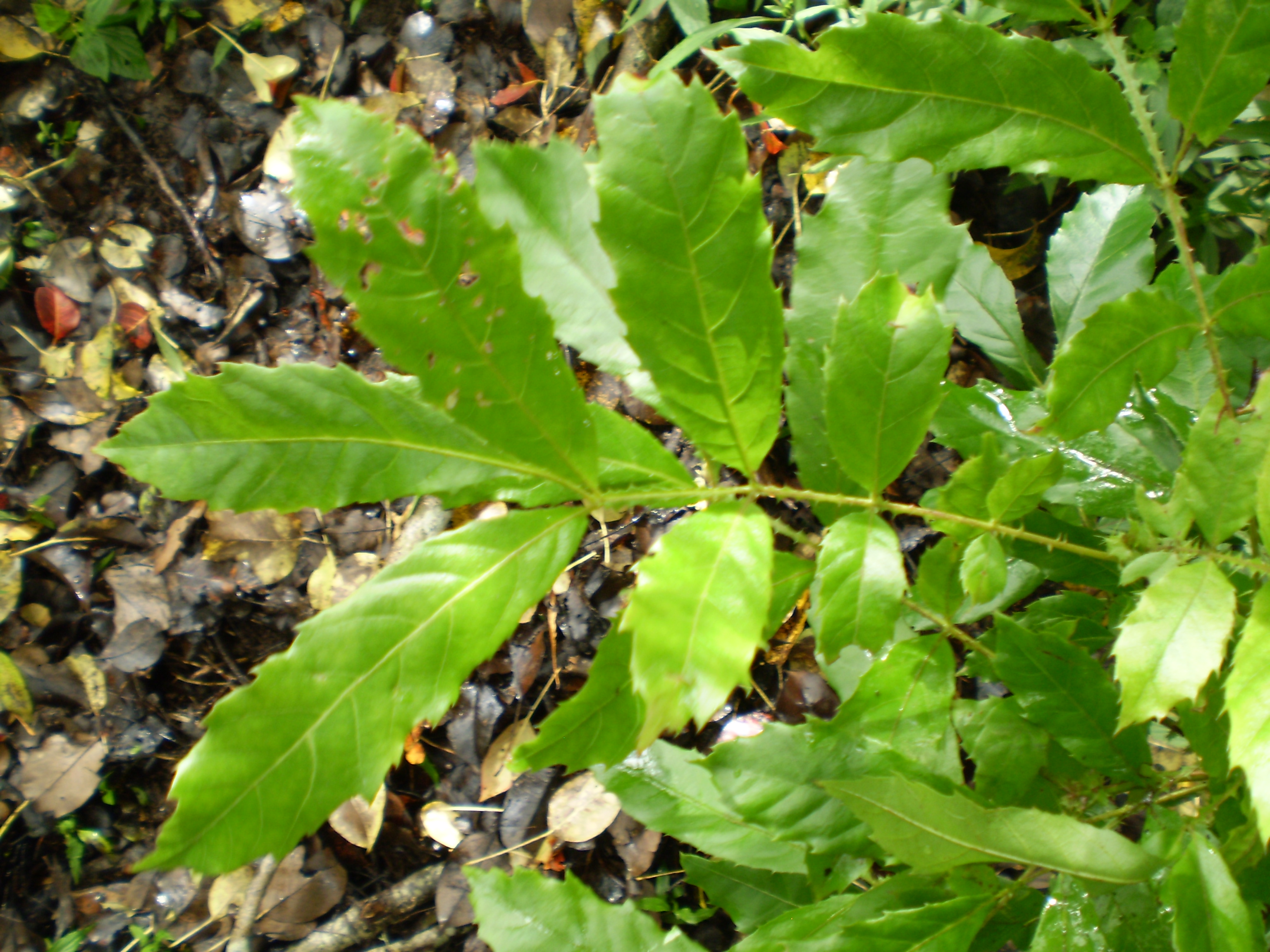
- Cultivated leaf

Conservation status
- Endangered (NCA)

Scientific classification
- Kingdom: Plantae
- Clade: Tracheophytes
- Clade: Angiosperms
- Clade: Eudicots
- Clade: Rosids
- Order: Oxalidales
- Family: Cunoniaceae
- Genus: Davidsonia
- Species: D. johnsonii

Binomial name
- Davidsonia johnsonii J.B.Williams & G.J.Harden

= Davidsonia johnsonii =

Species of tree

Davidsonia johnsonii, commonly known as smooth Davidson's plum, is a small tree native to rainforests of eastern Australia. The leaves are compound, glossy and hairless. It is a rare tree in the wild, but it is cultivated for its edible fruit.

The fruit is a deep burgundy colour, with a sour flavour and is popular in jams. It is cultivated in small plantations. Due to infertile seeds it can only be propagated from cuttings or division. Hence all cultivated material is derived from clones of wild plants. Plants take at least six years to produce fruit. Some selections are heavy bearing.
