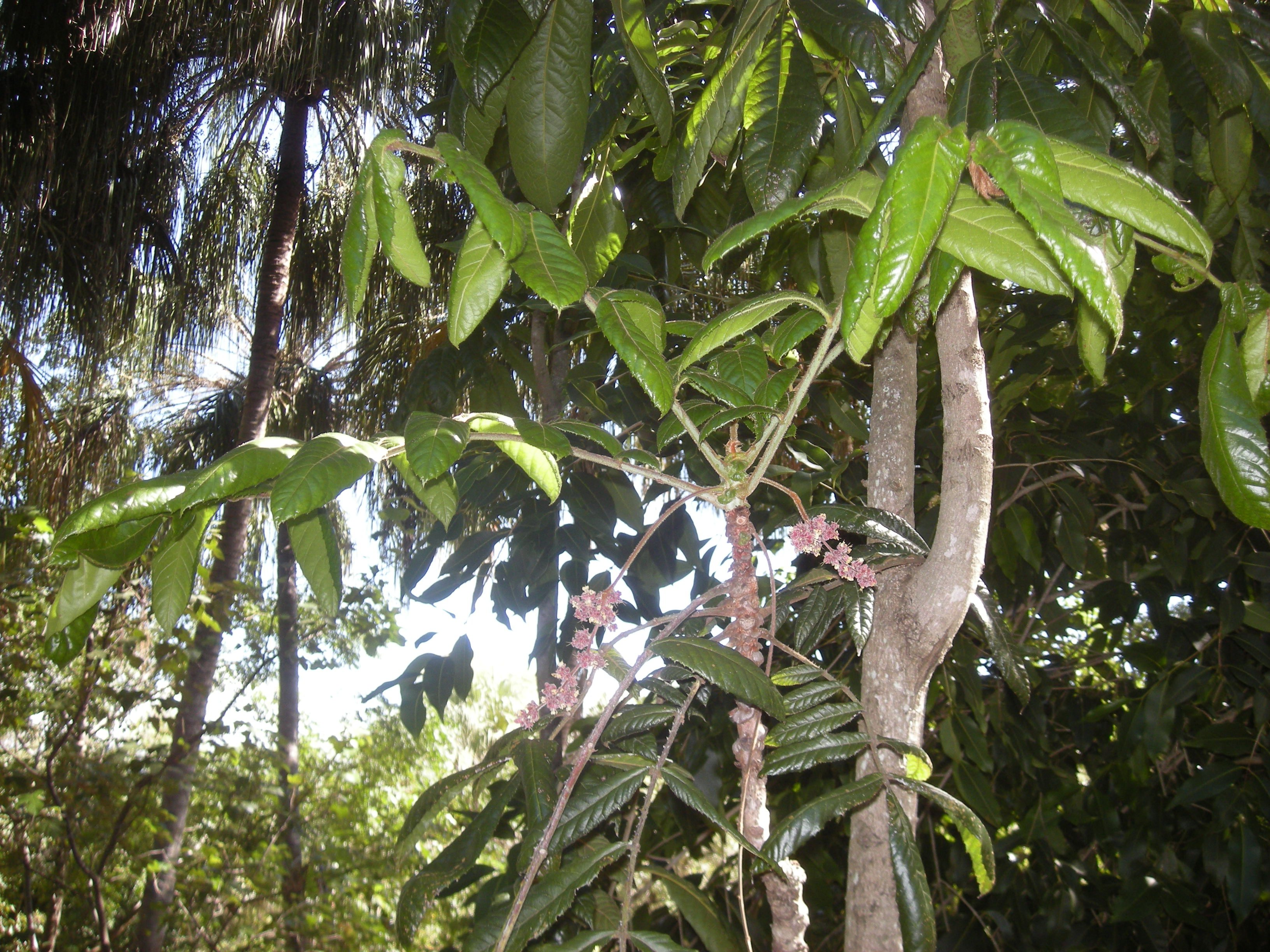
- Foliage and flowers

Conservation status
- Least Concern (IUCN 3.1)

Scientific classification
- Kingdom: Plantae
- Clade: Tracheophytes
- Clade: Angiosperms
- Clade: Eudicots
- Clade: Rosids
- Order: Oxalidales
- Family: Cunoniaceae
- Genus: Davidsonia
- Species: D. pruriens

Binomial name
- Davidsonia pruriens F.Muell

Synonyms
- Davidsonia pungens T.Moore & Mast., orth. var.

= Davidsonia pruriens =

Species of tree

Davidsonia pruriens, also known as ooray, Davidson's plum, or Queensland Davidson's plum, is a medium-sized rainforest tree of northern Queensland, Australia.

The leaves are large and compound. The edible dark burgundy-coloured fruit is produced in large clusters from the branches or the trunk, depending on the type. There are at least two distinct forms, with a suggestion that one of these is an undescribed species.

The indigenous name - ooray - is being increasingly used by growers and processors.

== Habitat ==
Various types of wetter, primary rainforests, at elevations from sea level to 1,000 metres.

== Uses ==
The tree is cultivated to a limited extent for its sour fruit, which is used to make jam, sauces, cordial and wine. The fruit is high in antioxidant activity.

== Gallery ==
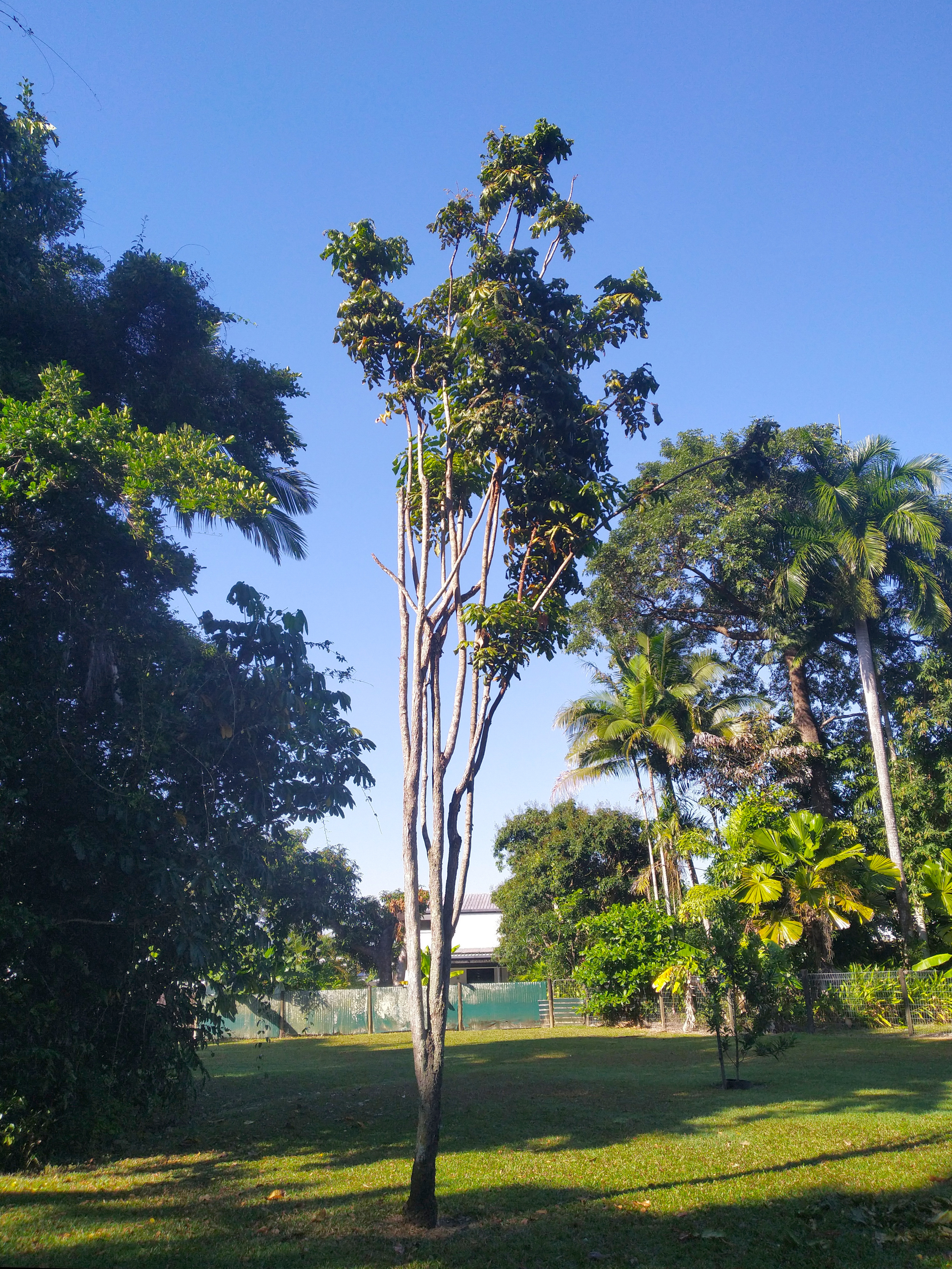
Habit

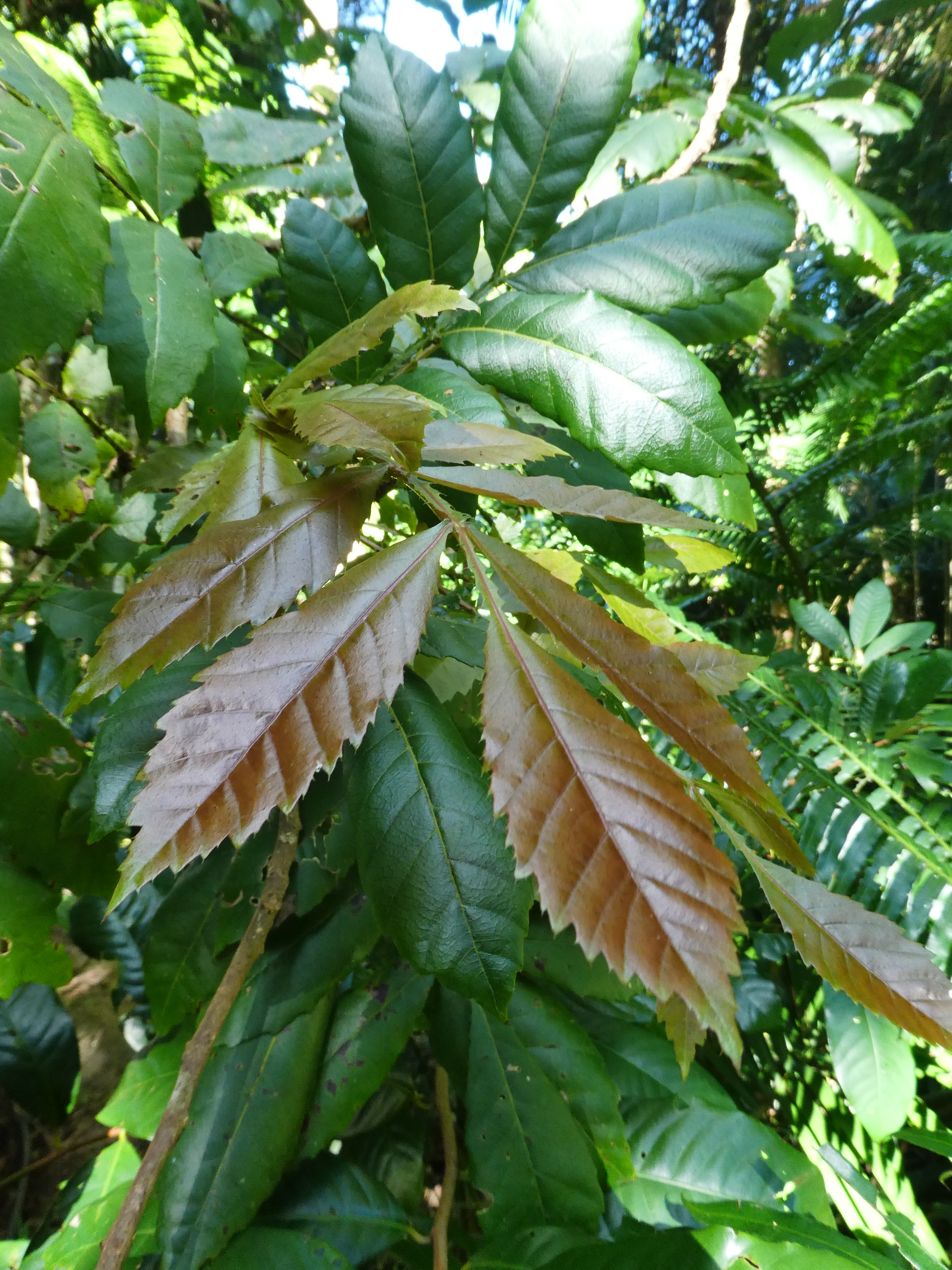
New leaves

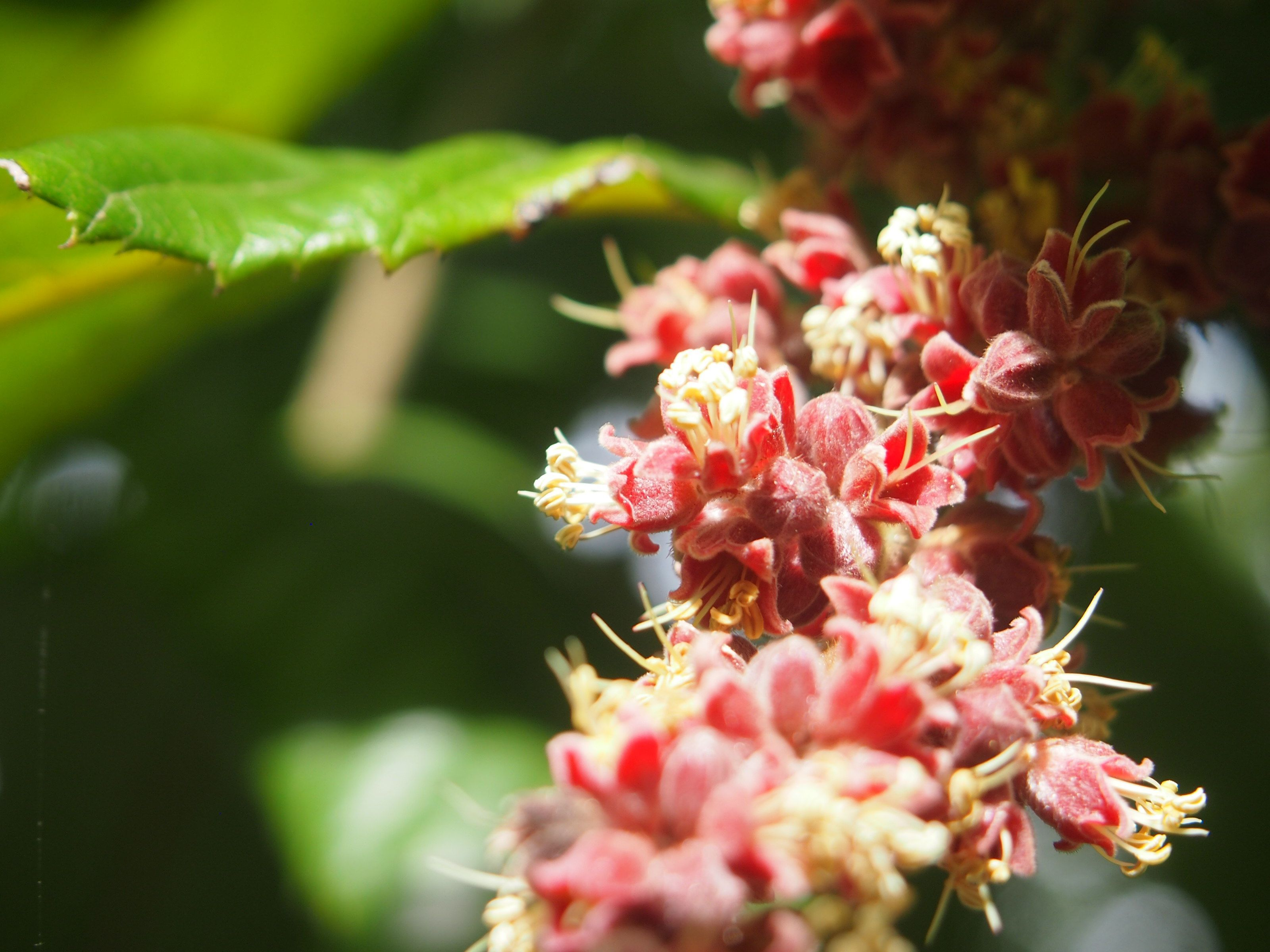
Flowers

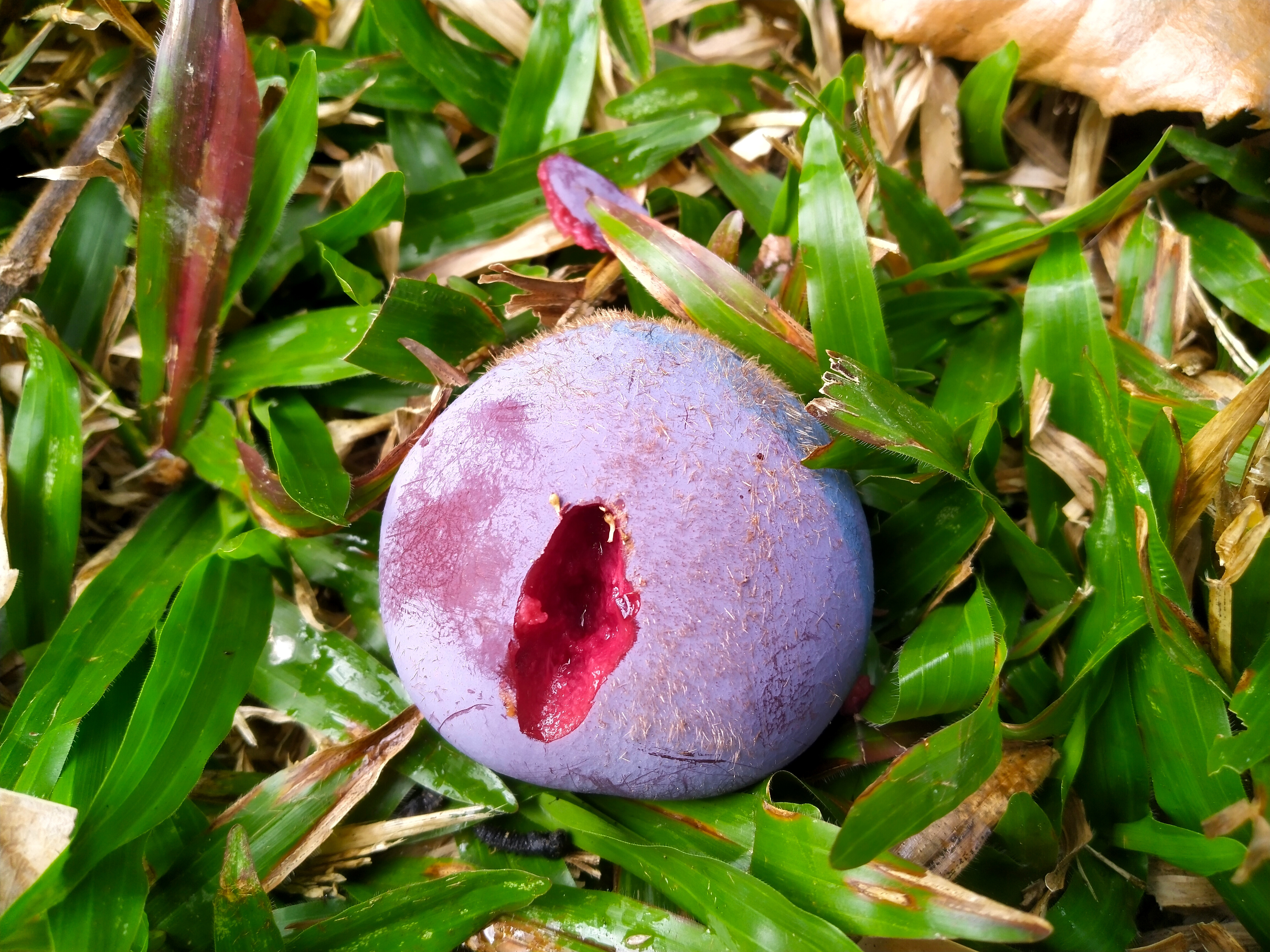
Fruit

== External sources ==
- Ooray name origin
- Konczak, Izabela (2009). Health Benefits of Australian Native Foods - An evaluation of health-enhancing compounds. Australian Government: Rural Industries Research and Development Association. ISBN 978-1-74151-932-7. Archived from the original on 26 February 2011.
