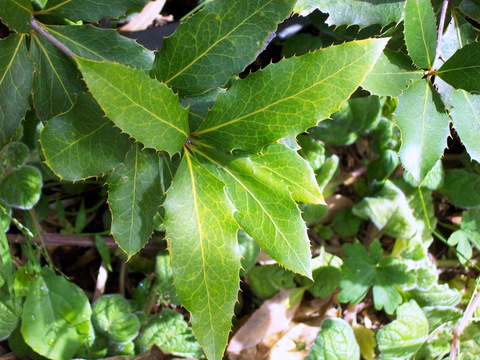
- Eidothea hardeniana

Scientific classification
- Kingdom: Plantae
- Clade: Tracheophytes
- Clade: Angiosperms
- Clade: Eudicots
- Order: Proteales
- Family: Proteaceae
- Subfamily: Proteoideae
- Genus: Eidothea; A.W.Douglas & B.Hyland

Type species
- Eidothea zoexylocarya A.W.Douglas & B.Hyland

Species
- See text

= Eidothea =

Genus of rainforest trees native to Australia

Eidothea is a genus of two species of rainforest trees in New South Wales and Queensland, in eastern Australia, constituting part of the plant family Proteaceae. The plant family Proteaceae was named after the shape-shifting god Proteus of Greek mythology. The genus name Eidothea refers to one of the three daughters of Proteus.

== History ==
In 1883 German-Australian botanist Ferdinand von Mueller named fossil seeds Xylocaryon lockii from Miocene age sediments excavated in old gold mining sites in Victoria; they match those of Eidothea and are thought to represent the modern plant.

== Distribution ==
Eidothea is known from geographic areas separated by more than 1,000 km (620 mi), the mountains of the Wet Tropics of north-eastern Queensland, the Nightcap Range area of north-eastern New South Wales and as the fossils from southern Victoria, much further to the south, underlining the fact that Australia's rainforests are tiny remnants of ancient rainforests that millions of years ago covered large parts of Australia. This makes them a particularly precious part of Australia's natural heritage.

== Taxonomy ==
The family Proteaceae also includes more well known members such as the waratahs, grevilleas, banksias, macadamias and proteas. Proteaceae is a very old family of flowering plants which probably originated while the ancient supercontinent of Gondwana was still undivided. Gondwana consisted of what are now the continents of Australia, Africa, South America and Antarctica, as well as smaller bits and pieces such as New Zealand, New Caledonia and Madagascar. Gondwana began splitting up over 120 million years ago and the fragments carried a diverse array of plants and animals with them, including a variety of lineages of the Proteaceae. Eidothea is the only relic of one of those early lineages that has barely survived in the rainforests of eastern Australia. Other lineages went on to diversify spectacularly, resulting in hundreds of descendant species.

Eidothea lies within the subfamily Proteoideae, which contain such plants as Protea, Leucadendron, Leucospermum, and most other South African Proteaceae, Isopogon (Australian ‘drumsticks’), Adenanthos (Australian jugflowers), Petrophile (Australian ‘conesticks’), Conospermum (Australian smoke-bushes).

=== Species ===
Two living species are known:

- Eidothea hardeniana – natural occurrences known only in the Nightcap National Park and in the adjacent Whian Whian State Conservation Area and listed as an endangered species on Schedule 1 of the New South Wales Threatened Species Conservation Act, 1995.
- Eidothea zoexylocarya – known from the slopes of Mount Bartle Frere and nearby mountains, in the region around Cairns, in north-eastern Queensland.
