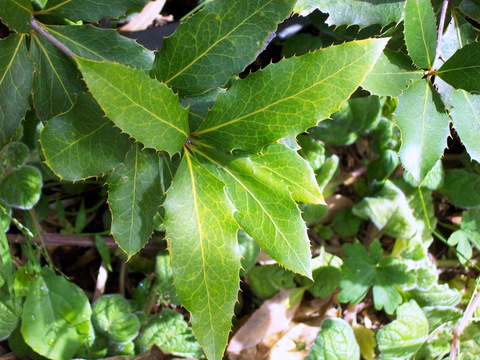
- Nightcap oak leaves at Royal Botanic Gardens, Sydney

Conservation status
- Critically Endangered (IUCN 3.1)

- Critically endangered (EPBC Act)

Scientific classification
- Kingdom: Plantae
- Clade: Tracheophytes
- Clade: Angiosperms
- Clade: Eudicots
- Order: Proteales
- Family: Proteaceae
- Genus: Eidothea
- Species: E. hardeniana

Binomial name
- Eidothea hardeniana P.H.Weston & Kooyman

= Eidothea hardeniana =

Species of tree native to Australia

Eidothea hardeniana, commonly named nightcap oak, is a species of tree, up to 40 m (130 ft) tall, of the plant family Proteaceae, which botanist Robert Kooyman recognised as a new species only recently in 2002. It is found only in the Nightcap Range in northern New South Wales, Australia. The species has an official listing as critically endangered on the Australian Commonwealth EPBC Act and as Endangered on the NSW Threatened Species Act. The name hardeniana honours the botanist Gwen Harden. Phylogenetics studies now suggest it represents a basal branch of the Proteoid clade of the Proteaceae.

== Distribution and habitat ==
The trees are only known to grow naturally in a single creek catchment in warm temperate rainforest in the Nightcap Range, northern New South Wales, Australia, referred to in the original description paper as "in Nightcap National Park and in the adjacent Whian Whian State Forest", more specifics of the recent (2000s) Nightcap NP collecting locality being undisclosed; a previous specimen was collected earlier, by L.J. Webb and J.G. Tracey in 1953, as part of an ecological survey of Whian Whian State Forest, but only determined as this species later. The trees grow naturally in relatively poor, acidic volcanic soils, in an area of a high rainfall. Only around 100 wild plants are known. Plants are in cultivation, including in the Royal Botanic Gardens, Sydney.

Much of its habitat was devastated by bushfire in 2019–20. However, the plant has the ability to survive fires by coppicing itself as well as reproducing with its large seeds, and less than a fifth are thought to have died.

== Description ==
Eidothea hardeniana trees have pale lichen covered bark typical of many species in the Warm Temperate Rainforests. Often a ring of coppice shoots surrounds the base of an adult tree, coppice and seedling leaves have spiny marginal teeth, while adult leaves have no teeth.

Flowers are cream, occur in clusters and smell of aniseed.

Fruits are large and rounded with a yellow green skin and a hard nut inside. The walls of the nut are ribbed, a feature unique to this genus in the family. The seed has a white center and it probably contains poisonous cyanogenic compounds like some species of Macadamia. These toxins do not deter rodents from eating through the hard nut and devouring the seeds, limiting the regeneration of this plant.

== Flower photos ==
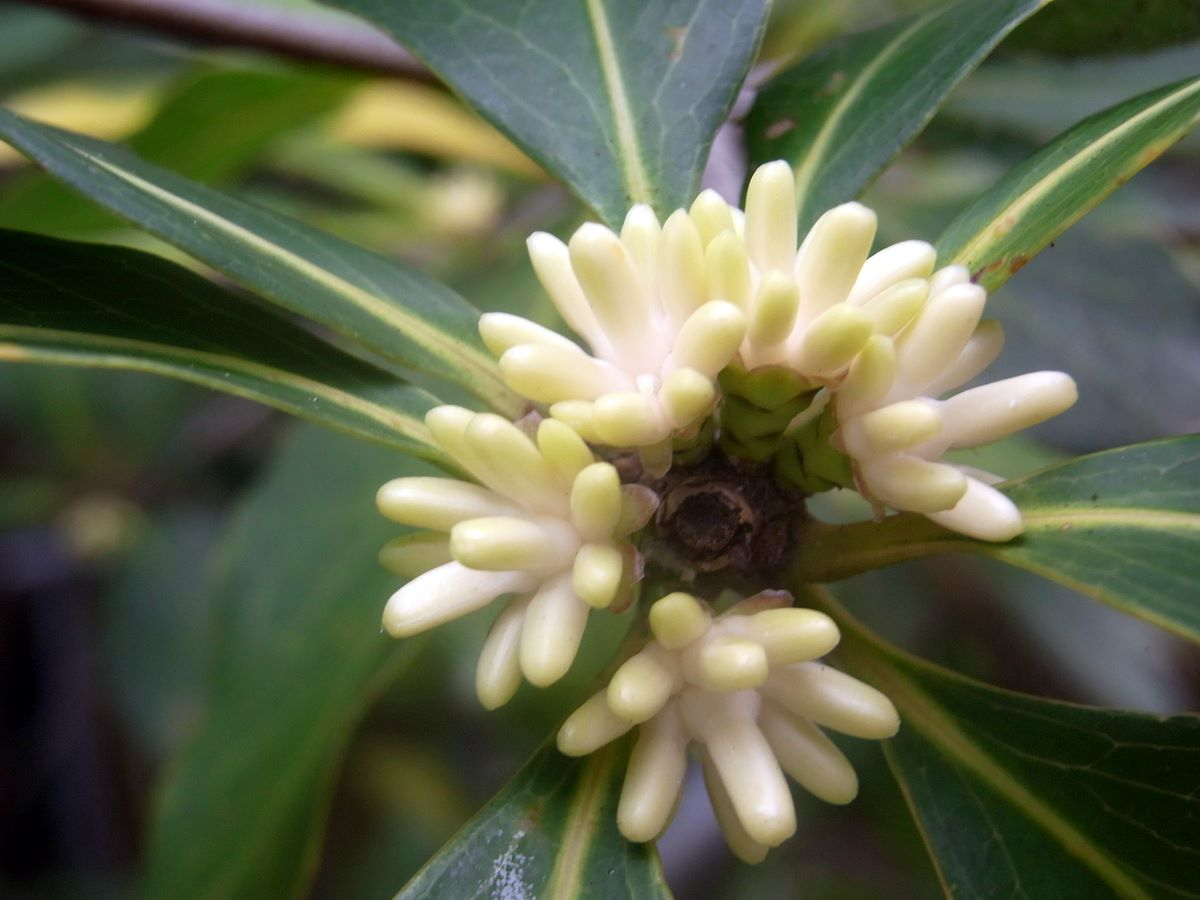
Un-opened buds

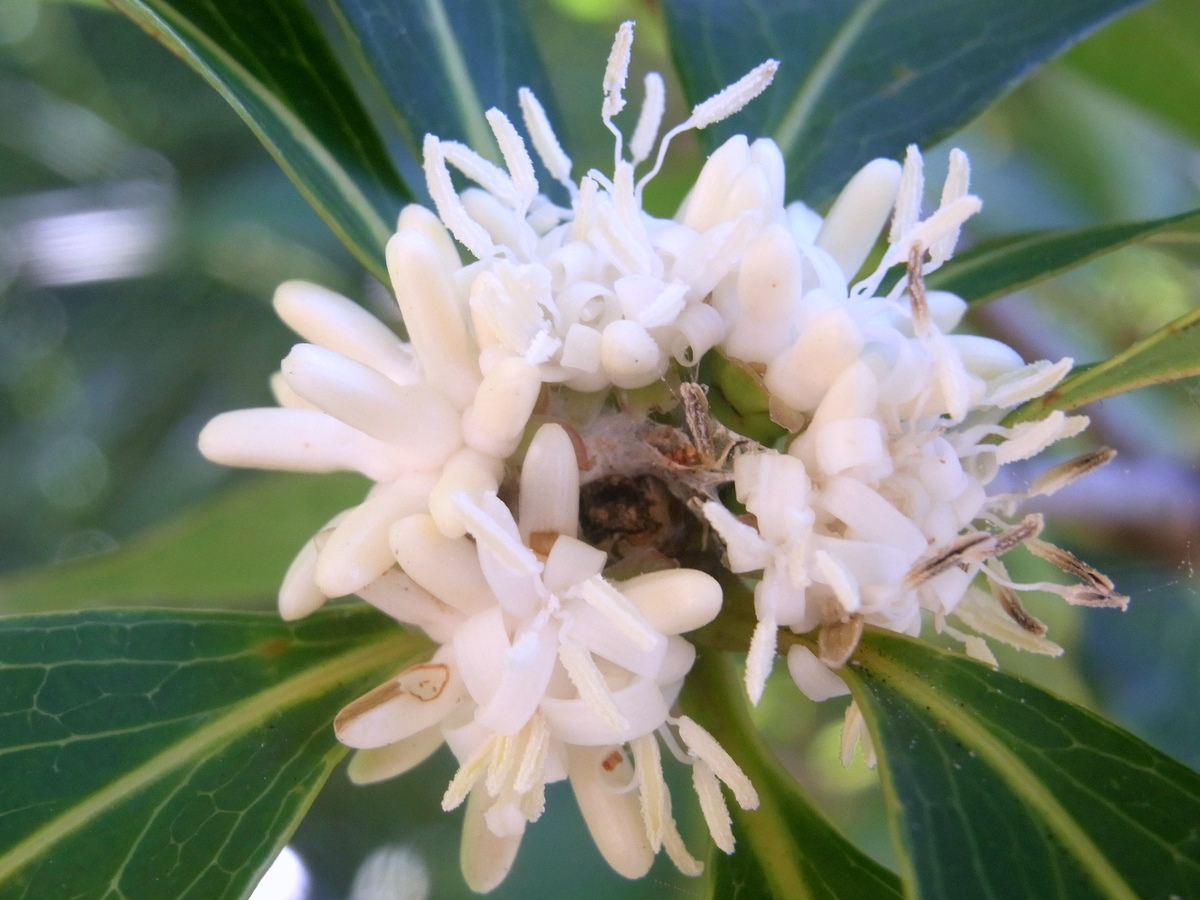
Flowers

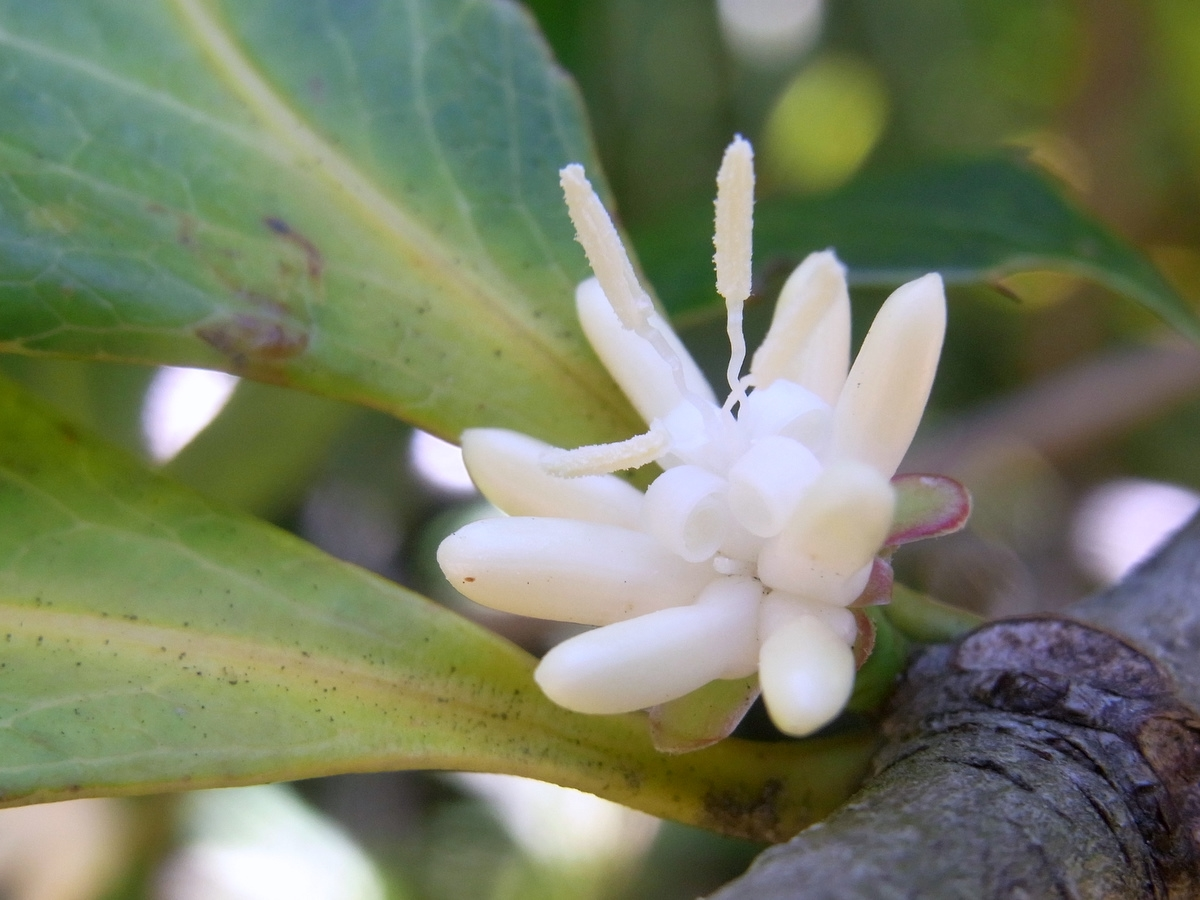
Flowers

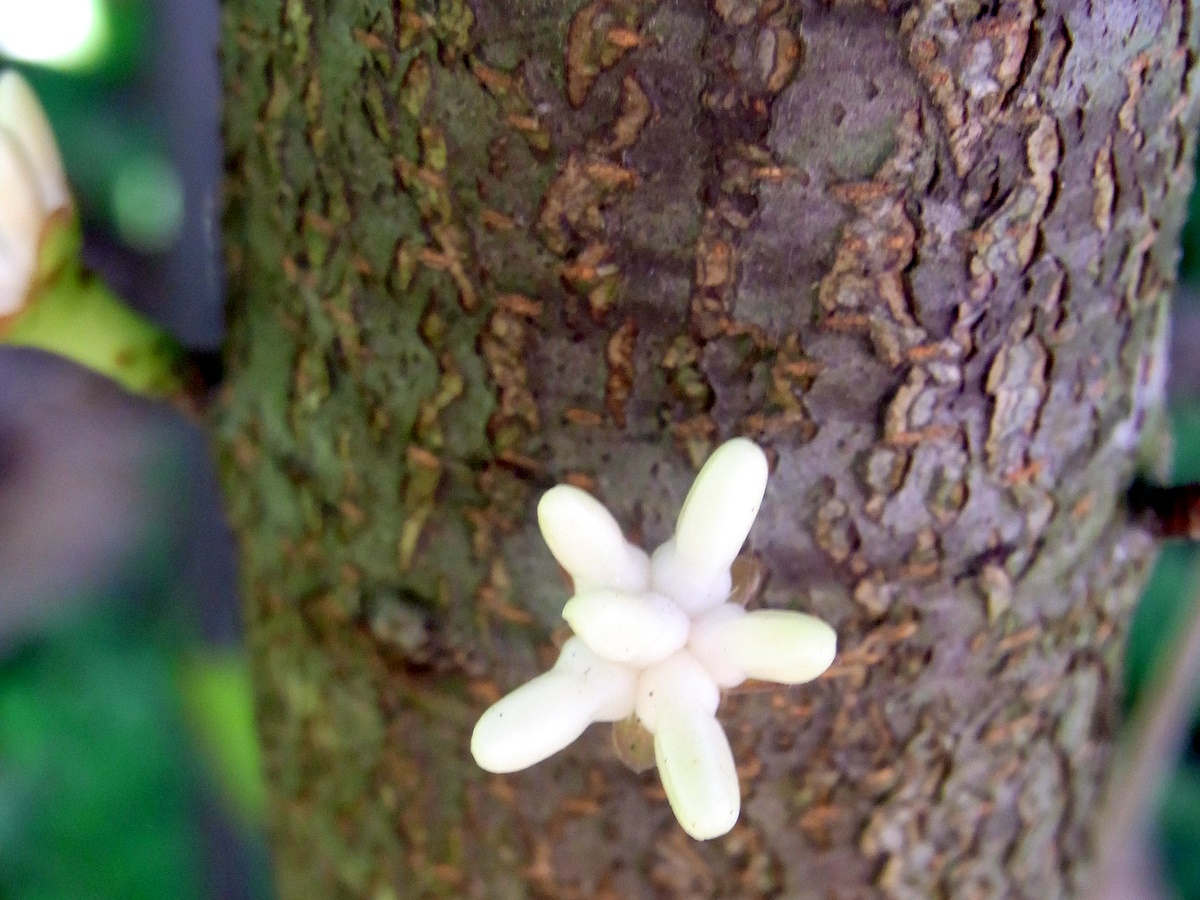
Flower growing directly from the main stem
