= Mount Pieter Botte =

Mountain in Queensland, Australia

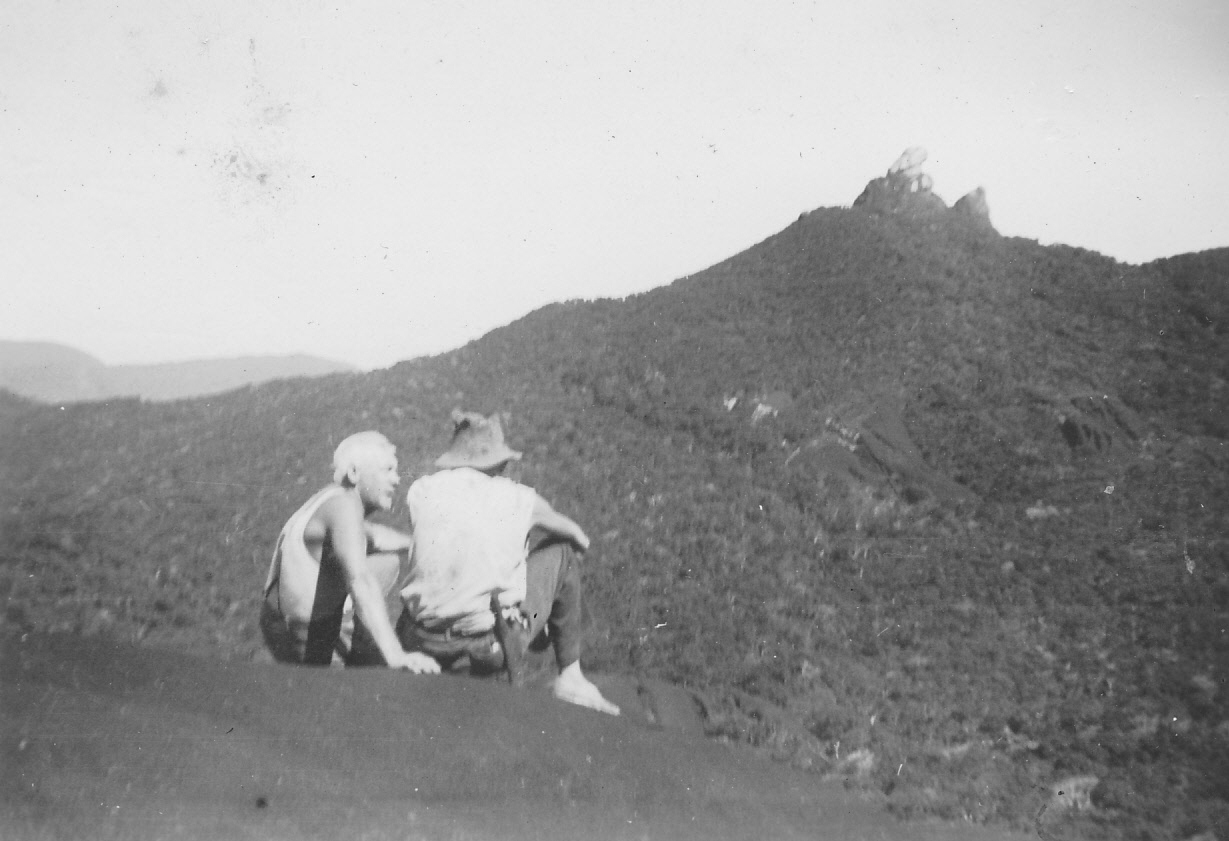
- Mount Pieter Botte in 1935

Highest point
- Elevation: 1,047 m (3,435 ft)
- Listing: Mountains of Australia
- Coordinates: 16°04′S 145°24′E

Geography
- Location within Queensland
- Location: Shire of Douglas, Queensland, Australia
- Parent range: Great Dividing Range

Mount Pieter Botte, also known as Ngalba-bulal, Alpaboolal (meaning big top), or Barbar (meaning elder sister), or Ginpure (meaning younger sister), is a mountain in the tableland region behind Cape Tribulation in Far North Queensland, Australia. It was named in 1848 by Captain Owen Stanley of the survey ship HMS Rattlesnake. The name was chosen by those on board the Rattlesnake. (from Voyage of Rattlesnake page 104) because of its resemblance to Peter Botte Mountain, a famous peak on the island of Mauritius. The mountain is part of the Wet Tropics of Queensland World Heritage Site. There are two peaks, a northern peak and a southern peak. The South Peak is the highest point and the true summit of Mount Pieter Botte.

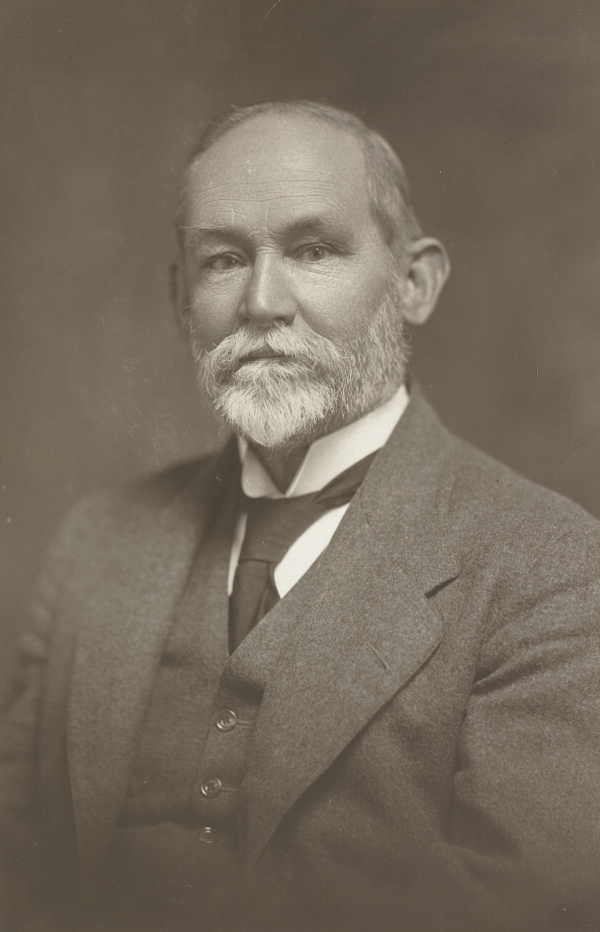
W. H. D. Le Souef

Australian Aborigines in the area were reported to believe that the mountain was home to their ancestral spirits.

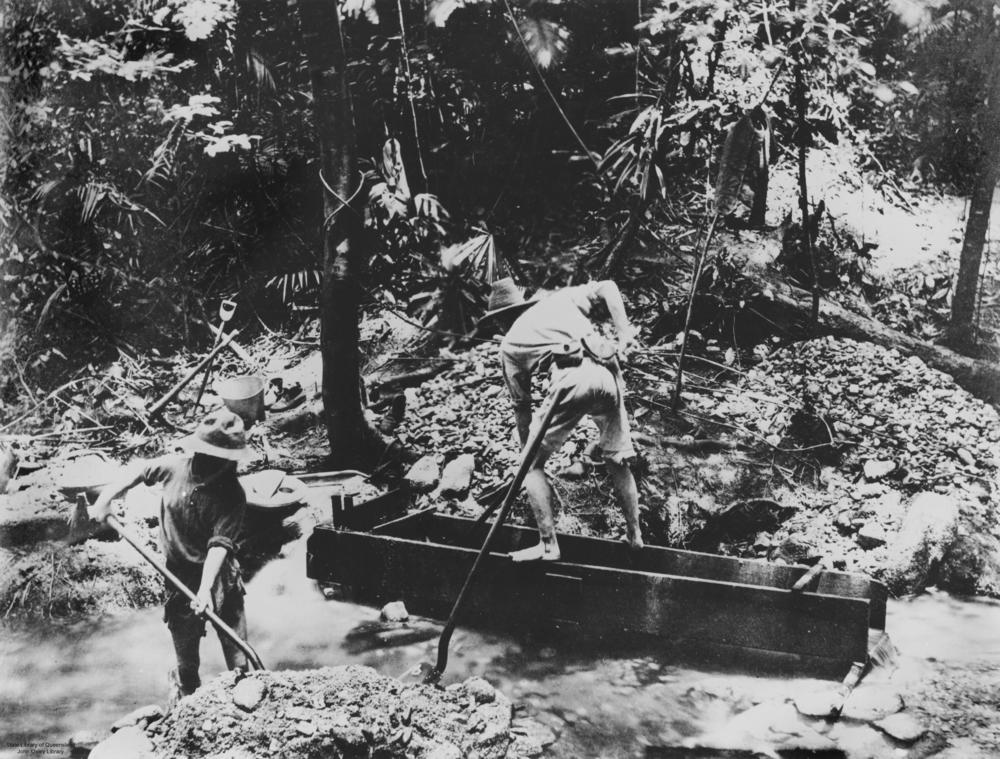
Tin mining to the east of Mount Pieter Bottle in 1884

Six Kuku Yalanji people, led by an elder, guided three Europeans up the climb in October 1896, the visiting botanist-cum-explorer Dudley Le Souef, Frank Hislop and Mr. Anderson. They climbed the North Peak and then climbed to the platform below the summit of Mount Pieter Botte (South Peak). This was the first recorded European party to climb the North Peak. The South Peak itself is a sheer-sided granite outcrop which was not climbed.

On 26 August 1938, Walter Mason, Wilfred Knight and Douglas Mason also climbed the tableland behind Cape Tribulation to the base of Mount Pieter Botte.

In 1988, Daniel Newton, Greg Mullens, six other Australians, one Israeli, and one Frenchman, hiked from Cape Tribulation to Mt. Pieter Botte and made the summit (quite terrifying at times). This was a free climb (no ropes). After, we got to the river and inflated our carried rafts and exited - note that crocodiles were much further upriver then previously reported. Beware, they have portaged upstream...

== Flora and fauna ==
Le Souef's expedition recorded riflebirds, catbirds, pittas, Spalding's orthonyx, shrikethrushes, Australian brushturkeys, Quoy's butcher bird, sulphur-crested cockatoos, superb fruit doves and tree kangaroos.

The wingless water bug Austrovelia queenslandica is known only from this area. Armoured Mistfrogs (Litoria lorica), a critically endangered species, have been observed in Roaring Meg Creek, just below Mount Pieter Botte.

A species of a Medicosma mountain rainforest understorey tree is known only from one sample in the Mount Pieter Botte area. Eidothea zoexylocarya is a large tree that only grows in the mountain rainforests of north-eastern Queensland, including Mount Pieter Botte. Romnalda ophiopogonoides is an endangered plant with only around 500 individuals known, including some around Roaring Meg Creek near the mountain.
