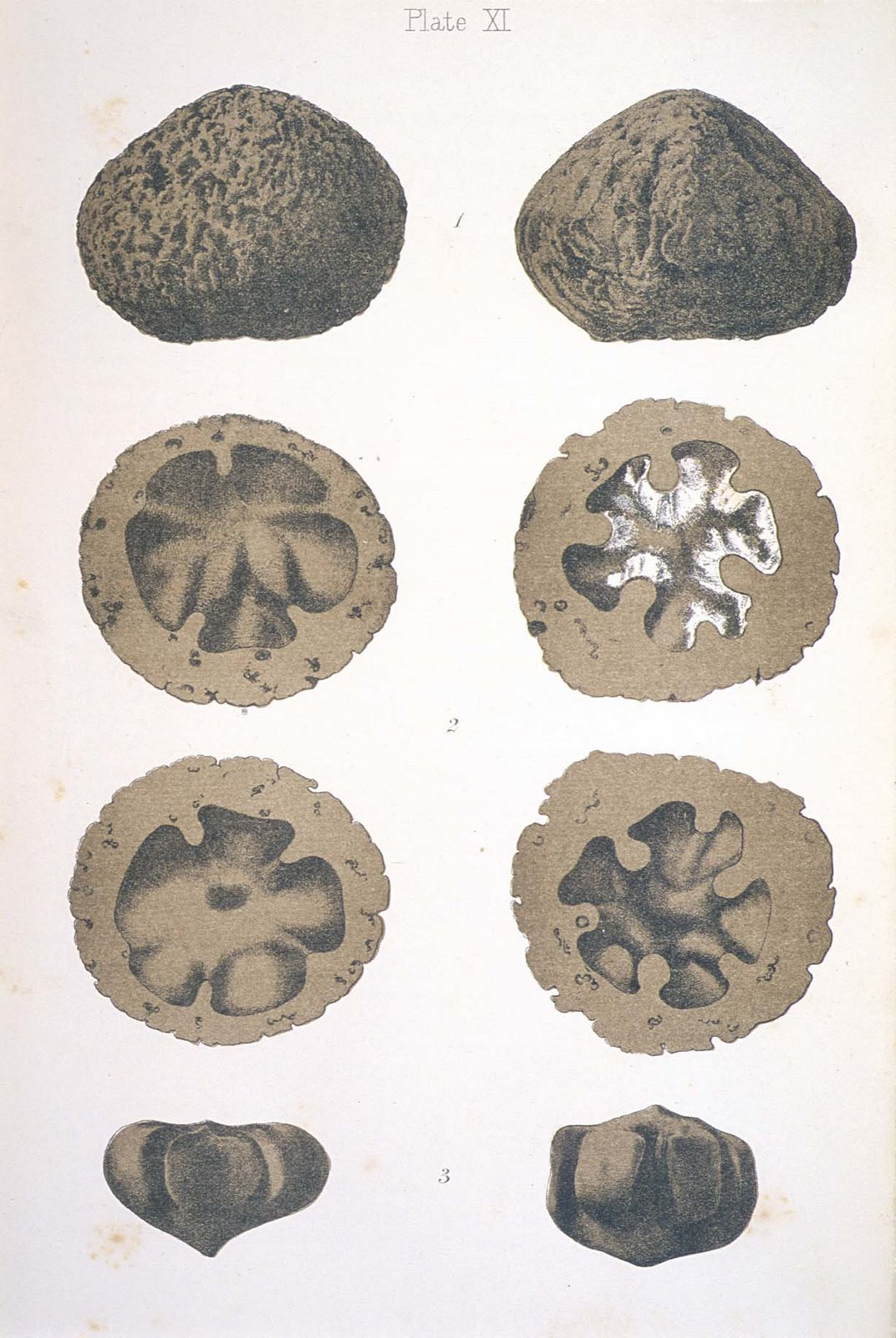
- Illustration of fruit

Scientific classification
- Kingdom: Plantae
- Clade: Tracheophytes
- Clade: Angiosperms
- Clade: Eudicots
- Order: Proteales
- Family: Proteaceae
- Genus: †Xylocaryon; F.Muell.
- Species: †X. lockii

Binomial name
- †Xylocaryon lockii F.Muell.

= Xylocaryon =

Xylocaryon Temporal range: Miocene

Extinct genus of flowering plants

Xylocaryon is an extinct genus of plants in the family Proteaceae. The sole species is Xylocaryon lockii from south-eastern Australia, described from fossilised fruits found at Nintingbool near Ballarat, Victoria and Flinders Island in Tasmania. The fruit structure suggests a close relationship with the extant genus Eidothea.
