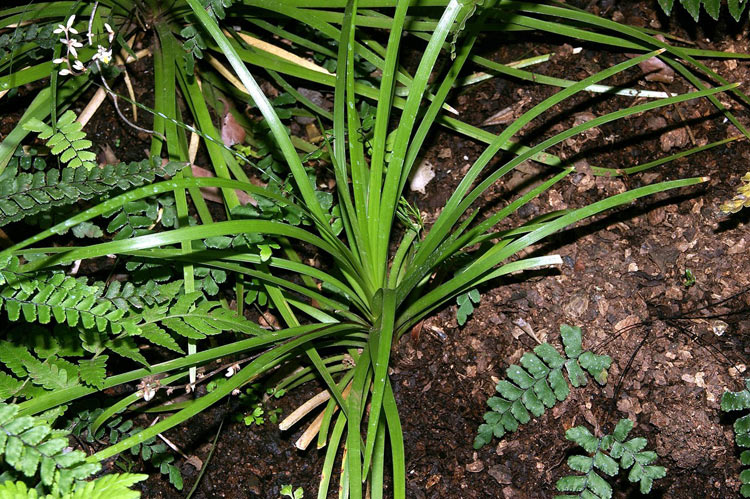

Conservation status
- Endangered (NCA)

Scientific classification
- Kingdom: Plantae
- Clade: Embryophytes
- Clade: Tracheophytes
- Clade: Angiosperms
- Clade: Monocots
- Order: Asparagales
- Family: Asparagaceae
- Subfamily: Lomandroideae
- Genus: Romnalda
- Species: R. ophiopogonoides

Binomial name
- Romnalda ophiopogonoides Conran, P.I.Forst. & Donnon

= Romnalda ophiopogonoides =

Species of flowering plant

Romnalda ophiopogonoides is a species of plant in the asparagus family Asparagaceae endemic to a restricted area of the Wet Tropics of Queensland. In the wild, it has only been found in a few isolated locations in the vicinity of Cooper Creek.

It is a small, hard-leaved lily-like plant that forms in tufts or in clumps, atop stilt-like roots. Its foliage grows up to approximately 15 cm (5.9 in) tall and has long, narrow leaves that are 6 to 12 cm (2.4 to 4.7 in) long and only 3–4 mm (0.12–0.16 in) wide. Its flower stalks are up to approximately 20 cm (7.9 in) tall, carrying clusters of the white flowers, their petals and sepals similar in appearance and 3–4 mm (0.12–0.16 in) long.
