= Gwen Harden =

Australian botanist and author

Gwen Harden OAM
- Born: 1940 (age 85–86)
- Citizenship: Australian
- Known for: Botanist
- Scientific career
- Fields: botany
- Author abbrev. (botany): G.J.Harden

Notes
- 4-volume Flora of New South Wales

Gwenneth Jean Harden OAM (born 1940) is an Australian botanist and author.

In 1990 the first of her four volumes of the Flora of New South Wales was published. The four-volume set was fully revised in 2000.

The nightcap oak (Eidothea hardeniana) is named in her honour.

Harden was awarded the Medal of the Order of Australia in the 2004 Australia Day Honours for her "service to botany as a researcher, publisher, conservationist and educator".
