= SBS =

SBS may refer to:

== Broadcasting ==
- SBS Broadcasting Group, defunct European media group
- Talpa TV, Dutch broadcasting company, formerly SBS Broadcasting B.V.
  - SBS6, Dutch television channel owned by Talpa TV
  - SBS9, Dutch television channel owned by Talpa TV
- Special Broadcasting Service, Australian public service broadcaster
  - SBS (Australian TV channel) Australian public television network and division of the Special Broadcasting Service
- Seoul Broadcasting System, largest South Korean private broadcaster
  - SBS TV, television channel operated by the Seoul Broadcasting System
- Shizuoka Broadcasting System, Japanese broadcaster
- Spanish Broadcasting System, American radio and television broadcaster
- Scottish Broadcasting Service, proposed replacement to BBC Scotland

== Organisations ==
- Satellite Business Systems, a former company
- SBS Bank, New Zealand
- Save British Science, former name of the Campaign for Science and Engineering
- SBS Technologies, owned by GE Automation & Controls
- Society for Biomolecular Sciences, a former learned society
- SongBird Survival, a United Kingdom organization
- Southall Black Sisters, Asian women's group, London, England

=== Military ===
- Special Boat Service, United Kingdom
- Special Boat Service (Nigeria), Nigeria
- Special Boat Squadron (Sri Lanka), Sri Lanka Navy
- Unmanned Systems Forces of Ukraine, Ukraine

=== Education ===
- Saïd Business School, Oxford, England
- SBS Swiss Business School, Zürich
- Shanghai Business School, Shanghai, China
- Solvay Brussels School of Economics and Management (SBS-EM), Universite Libre de Bruxelles, Belgium
- Special Book Services, Brazil
- Strathclyde Business School, Scotland
- Stockholm Business School, Sweden
- Stoneleigh-Burnham School, Greenfield, Massachusetts, US
- Swansea Business School, Wales

== Transport ==
- SBS Transit, Singapore
- Select Bus Service, New York City, US
- Saginaw Bay Southern Railway (reporting mark), Mid-Michigan, US
- Seaboard System Railroad, a railroad in the US, predecessor to CSX Transportation
- Steamboat Springs Airport, Steamboat Springs, Colorado, US

== Science and technology ==
- Shaken baby syndrome
- Short bowel syndrome
- Sick building syndrome
- Stimulated Brillouin scattering
- Styrene-butadiene-styrene, a type of thermoplastic elastomer
- (+)-alpha-santalene synthase ((2Z,6Z)-farnesyl diphosphate cyclizing), an enzyme
- (+)-endo-beta-bergamotene synthase ((2Z,6Z)-farnesyl diphosphate cyclizing), an enzyme
- (-)-endo-alpha-bergamotene synthase ((2Z,6Z)-farnesyl diphosphate cyclizing), an enzyme

=== Computing ===
- Jive (software), formerly Jive SBS
- Smart Battery System, a specification
- Windows Small Business Server

== Sports ==
- SBS Championship, golf event held in Hawaii, sponsored by Seoul Broadcasting System
- SBS Invitational, golf event held in New Zealand, sponsored by SBS Bank
- Social Boston Sports, US

== Other uses ==
- Short barrel shotgun, US legal term
- Side by side (disambiguation), various meanings
- Silver Bauhinia Star, an honour in Hong Kong
- Solid bleached sulphate, a paperboard grade
