= (2Z,6Z)-farnesyl diphosphate lyase =

(2Z,6Z)-farnesyl diphosphate lyase may refer to:

- (+)-alpha-santalene synthase ((2Z,6Z)-farnesyl diphosphate cyclizing), an enzyme
- (+)-endo-beta-bergamotene synthase ((2Z,6Z)-farnesyl diphosphate cyclizing), an enzyme
- (−)-endo-alpha-bergamotene synthase ((2Z,6Z)-farnesyl diphosphate cyclizing), an enzyme
