= Side by side =

Side by side or side-by-side may refer to:

== Pairs and parallel arrangements ==
- Side-by-side (graphic), a type of split-screen format in television broadcasts
- Side-by-side (vehicle), a utility terrain vehicle
- Side-by-side assembly, a Microsoft Windows technology for alleviating DLL issues
- Air Command Commander Side-By-Side, an American gyroplane design
- Side-by-side display, a type of stereo display for 3D imaging
- Side-by-side elements, in pair skating
- Side-by-side seating, an alternative to a tandem arrangement
- Side-by-side shotgun, a type of double-barreled shotgun
- A type of refrigerator

== Film, television, and video games ==
- Side by Side (1975 film), a British comedy directed by Bruce Beresford
- Side by Side (1988 film), a film featuring Milton Berle
- Side by Side (1982 film), an American television film about the Osmond family
- Side by Side (2012 film), an American documentary by Christopher Kenneally
- Side by Side (2023 film), a Japanese film by Chihiro Ito
- Side by Side (film festival), an international LGBT film festival in Russia
- Side by Side (game series) or Battle Gear, a 1996–2006 racing video game series
- Side by Side (TV series), a 1992–1993 British sitcom
- "Side by Side", a segment of the 2017 Thai television series Project S: The Series
- "Side by Side", a Price Is Right pricing game on the American game show
- Lado a Lado (lit. Side by Side), a 2012 Brazilian telenovela

== Music ==
- Side by Side (band), an American hardcore punk band whose only release is the 1988 EP You're Only Young Once...

=== Albums ===
- Side by Side (Duke Ellington and Johnny Hodges album), 1959
- Side by Side (Imperials album), 1983
- Side by Side (Oscar Peterson and Itzhak Perlman album), 1994
- Side by Side, by Pat Boone, 1959
- Side by Side, by Richie Cole and Phil Woods, 1980

=== Songs ===
- "Side by Side" (1927 song), a song by Gus Kahn and Harry Woods, popularized by Kay Starr
- "Side by Side" (Earth, Wind & Fire song), 1983
- "Side by Side" (Feeder song), 2011
- "Side by Side" (Lynsey de Paul song), theme song from the 1975 film
- "Side by Side", by Barry Crump
- "Side by Side", by Bladee and Thaiboy Digital from Icedancer, 2018
- "Side by Side", by Rebecca St. James from Rebecca St. James, 1994
- "Side by Side", by Sofia Wylie from the animated special Marvel Rising: Chasing Ghosts in the Marvel Rising franchise, 2019
- "Side by Side", by Will Young from From Now On, 2002
- "Side by Side", by Aiobahn +81 featuring FuwaMoco for Nekopara: After: La Vraie Famille, 2025

== Other uses ==
- Side by Side (Italy), a political party
- Side by Side, a quarterly magazine published by CAFOD, the official aid agency of the Catholic Church in England and Wales
- "Side by Side", a storyline in the science fiction comedy webtoon series Live with Yourself!

== See also ==
- "Side by Side by Side", a song composed by Stephen Sondheim, from the 1970 musical Company
- Side by Side by Sondheim, a 1976 stage show celebrating Sondheim
- SXS (disambiguation)
