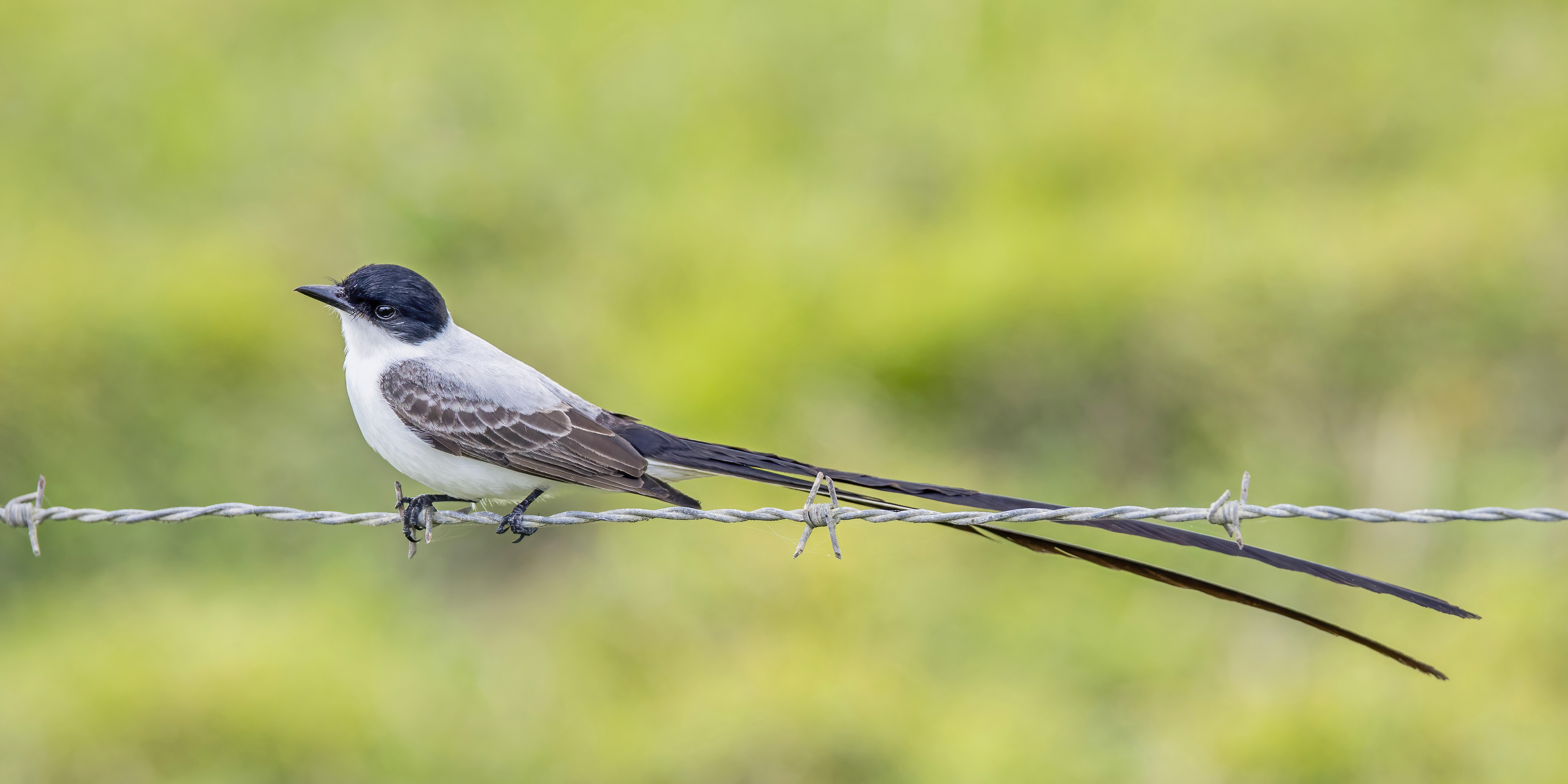
- Male T. s. monachus in Belize
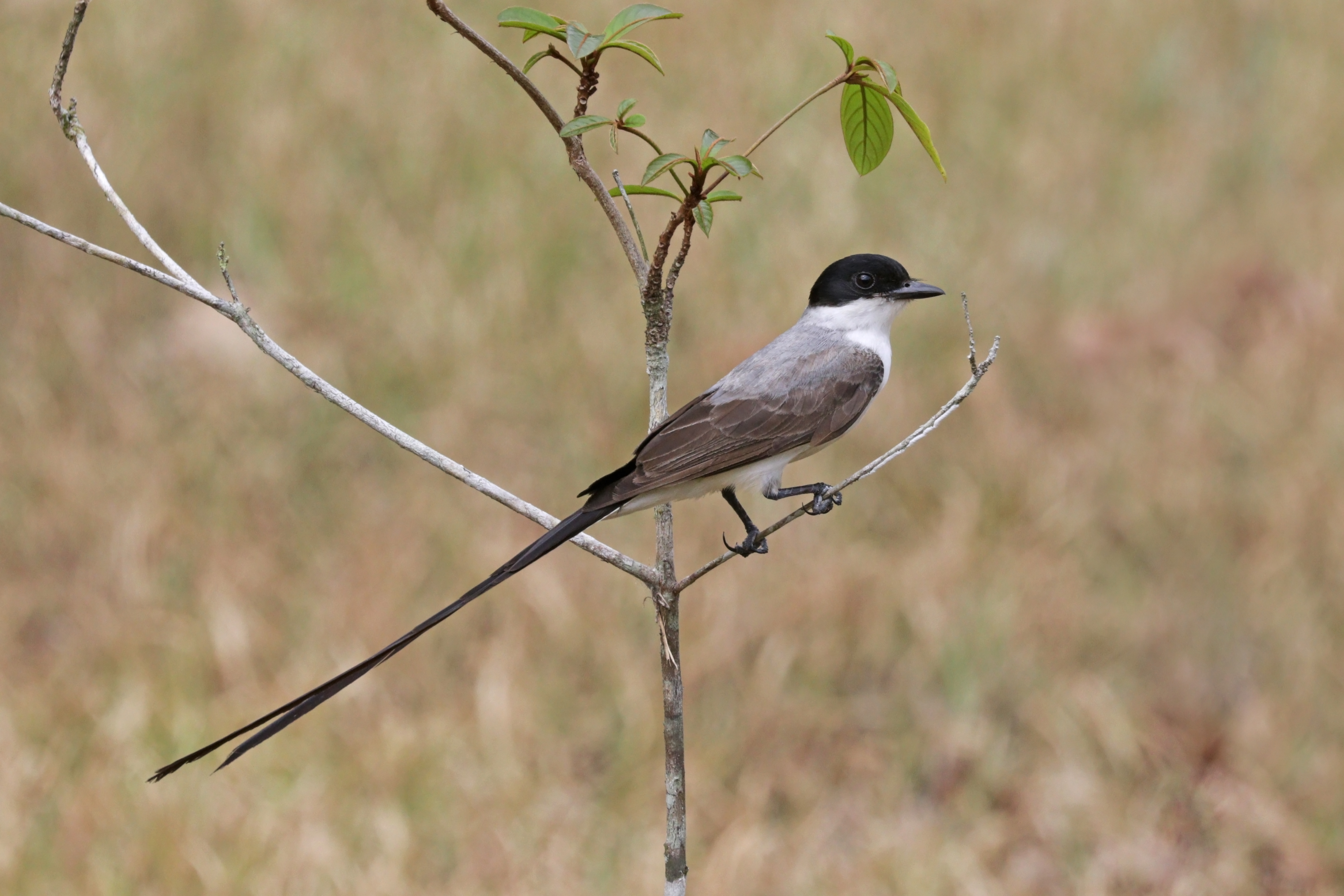
- Female T. s. monachus in Panama

Conservation status
- Least Concern (IUCN 3.1)

Scientific classification
- Kingdom: Animalia
- Phylum: Chordata
- Class: Aves
- Order: Passeriformes
- Family: Tyrannidae
- Genus: Tyrannus
- Species: T. savana

Binomial name
- Tyrannus savana Daudin, 1802
- Year-round Nonbreeding

= Fork-tailed flycatcher =

Species of bird

The fork-tailed flycatcher (Tyrannus savana) is a passerine bird of the tyrant flycatcher family and is a member of a genus typically referred to as kingbirds. Named for the long, forked tail, particularly in males, fork-tailed flycatchers are seen in shrubland, savanna, lightly forested and grassland areas, from southern Mexico to Argentina. They are frequently observed on conspicuous perches whence they sally after insect prey. Northern populations near southern Mexico tend to be permanent residents, while fork-tailed flycatchers that live further south are migrants with a reputation for wandering as far north as New Brunswick, Canada.

== Taxonomy ==
The fork-tailed flycatcher was described in 1760 by Mathurin Jacques Brisson under the French name "le tyran à queue fourchue" (lit. 'the fork-tailed tyrant') and then again in 1780 by Georges-Louis Buffon under the name "le savana" (because it lived in savannahs), but it was not until 1802 that François Marie Daudin coined the binomial name Tyrannus savana. The type locality is Suriname.

Four subspecies are recognised:

- Tyrannus savana monachus Hartlaub, 1844 – southern Mexico to Colombia, the Guianas, and northern Brazil
- Tyrannus savana sanctaemartae (Zimmer, JT, 1937) – northern Colombia and northwest Venezuela
- Tyrannus savana circumdatus (Zimmer, JT, 1937) – east-central Brazil
- Tyrannus savana savana Daudin, 1802 – central, southern South America and the Falkland Islands
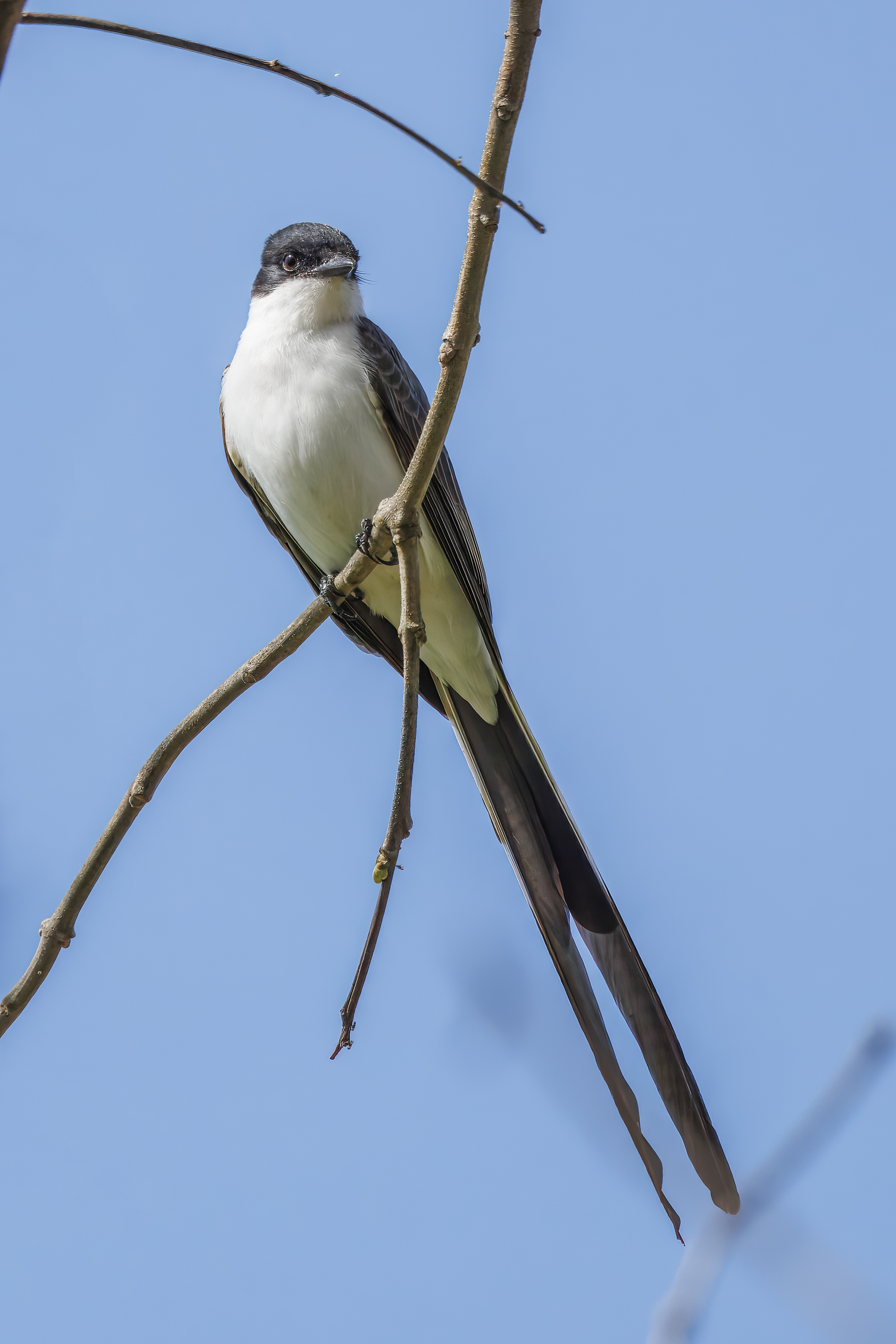
T. s. savana
Argentina

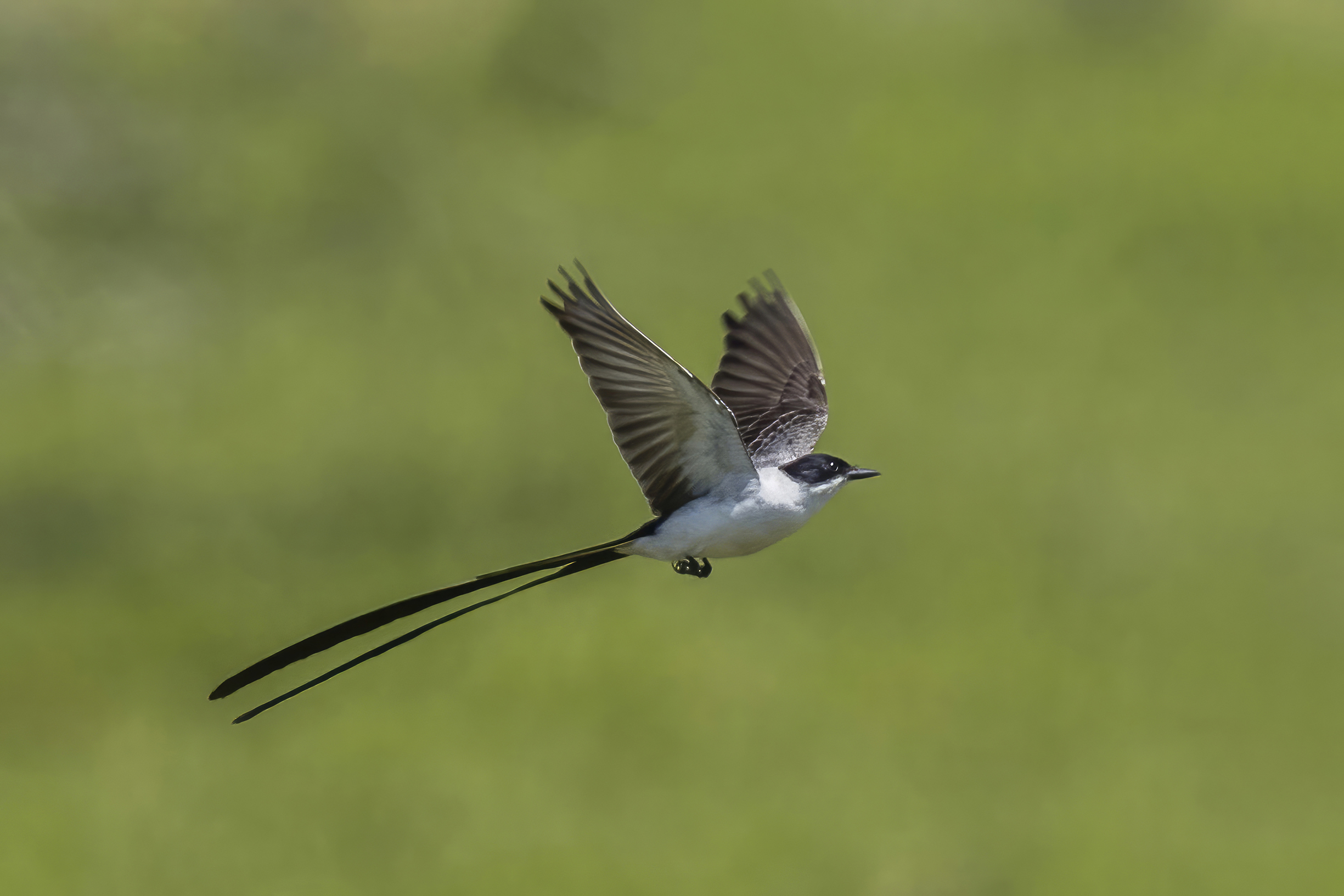
T. s. monachus
Belize

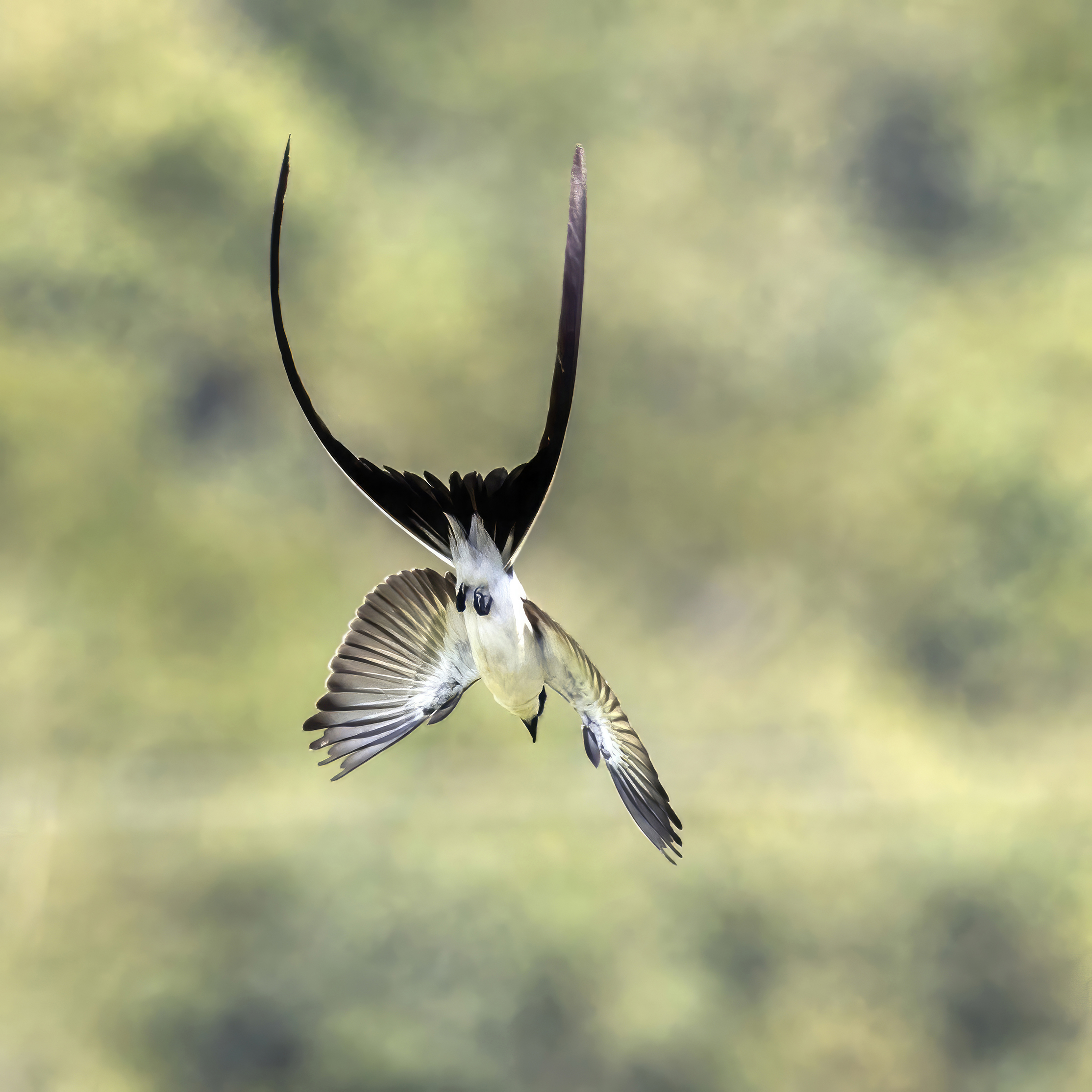
T. s. monachus
Belize
showing fork tail

== Description ==
The fork-tailed flycatcher is white below, gray above, and has a black cap. Males sometimes show a yellow crown stripe. Males also have an extremely long, forked tail, of even greater length than that of the related scissor-tailed flycatcher. Females have a somewhat shorter tail, and it is significantly shorter in juveniles.

Males are 37–41 cm (15–16 in) in length; females, 28–30 cm (11–12 in), including tail. They weigh only 28–32 g (0.99–1.13 oz), much less than closely related kingbirds, which are half the total length of this species. The tail in adult males is two to three times longer than the length of the bird from the bill to the base of the tail. Generally, males and females of the species look quite similar, but can be distinguished by the longer tail in males.

The nominate subspecies T. s. savana has a darker grey back compared to T. s. monachus and T. s. sanctaemartae, which have notable light backs that contrast greatly with their black heads. Discrete notches on the primary feathers are also quite handy in identifying subspecies.

Most fork-tailed flycatchers are migratory, but some stay year-round, especially in southern Mexico. Migratory fork-tailed flycatchers tend to have more pointed wings than nonmigratory flycatchers.

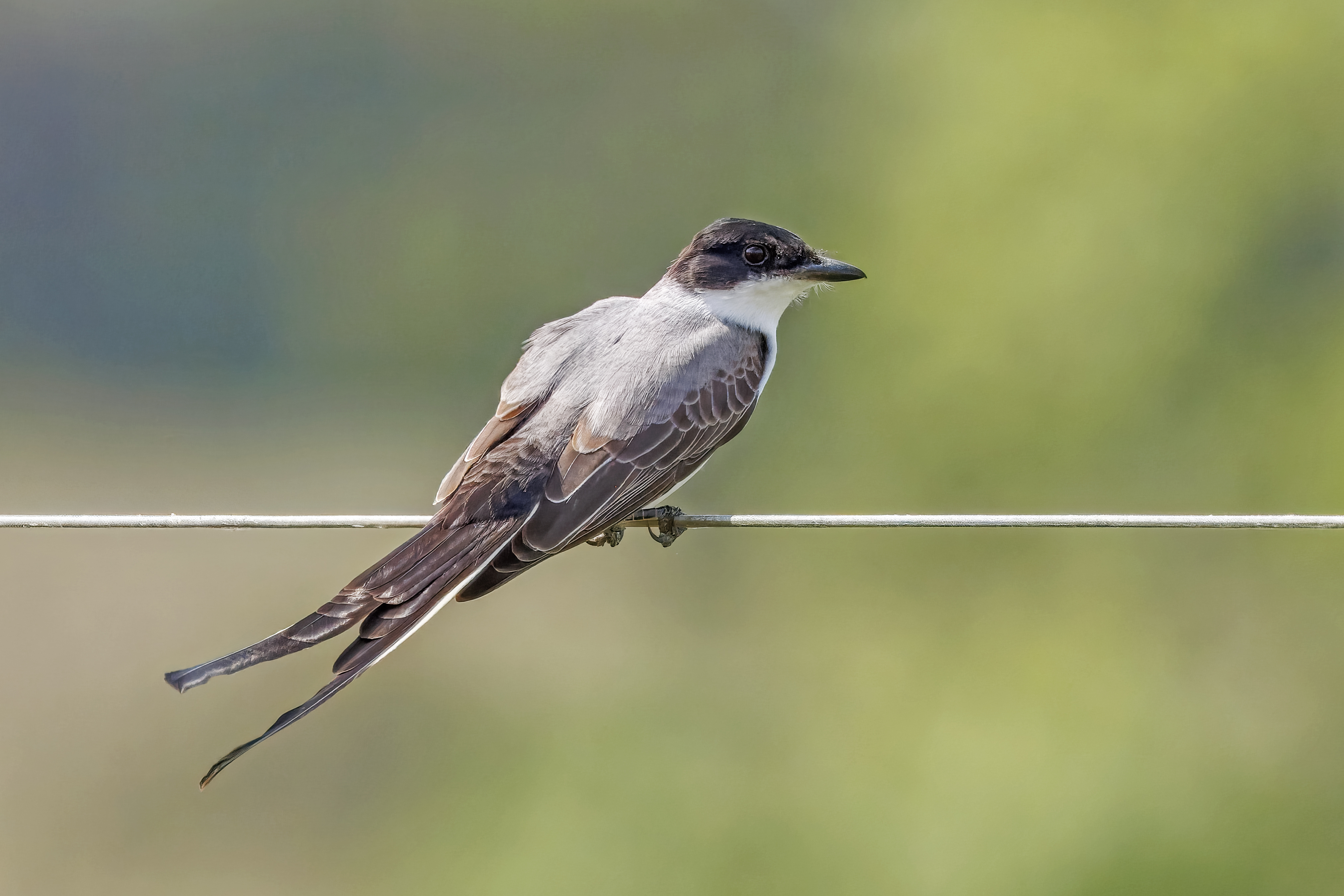
immature with shorter tail

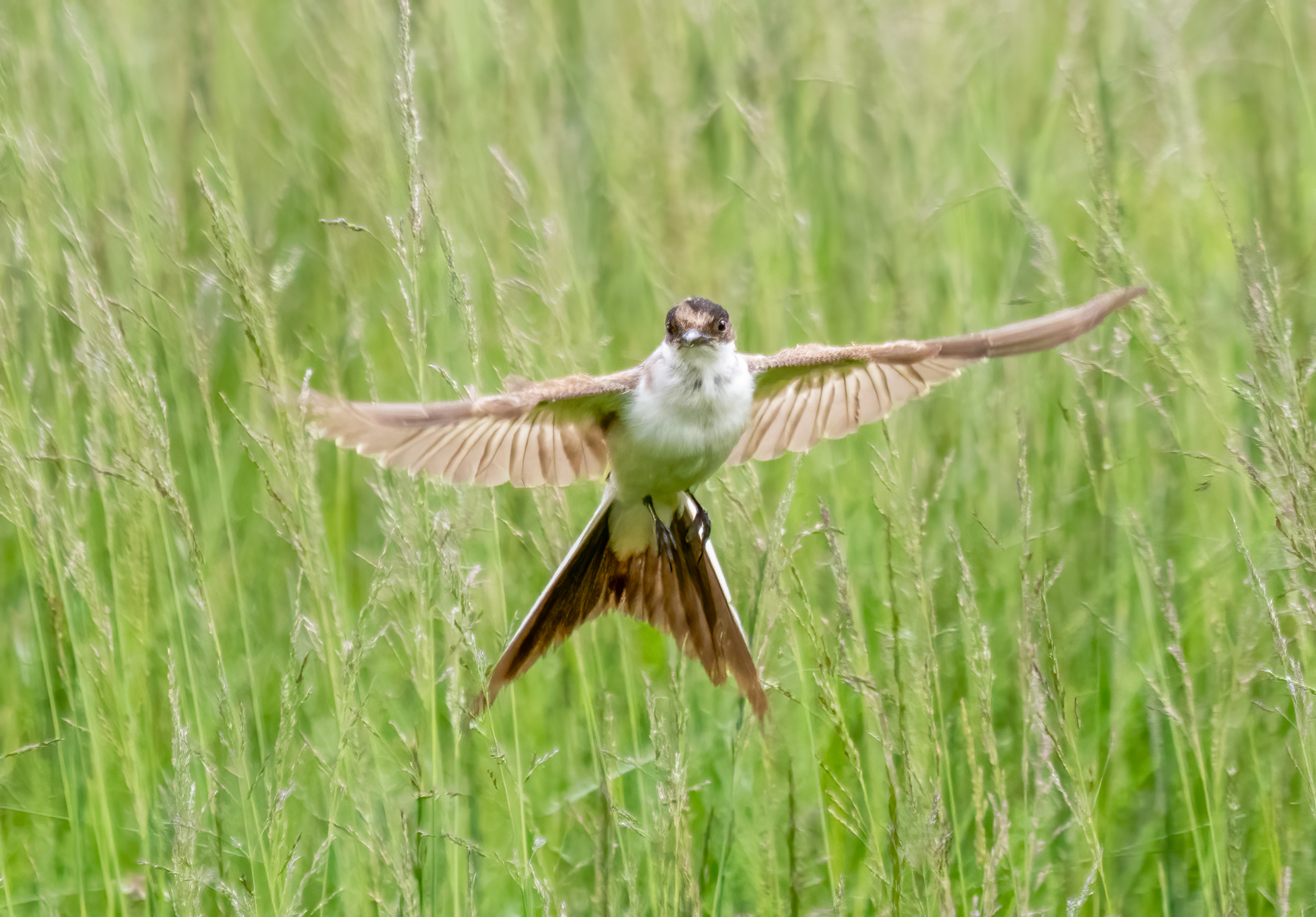
immature with shorter tail

=== Vocalizations ===
Fork-tailed flycatcher call in Argentina

Fork-tailed flycatchers produce both vocal and nonvocal sounds. In general, they have a dry, buzzy call, and a weak "tic-note" while in flight.

Their wings have been observed to make a distinct whistling note while flying overhead. Research has uncovered differences in the pitch of whistling noises by different subspecies of T. savana. This has supported a hypothesis that fork-tailed flycatchers are splitting into two species, as the nonmigratory birds have a much-lower-pitched whistling note than the migrators. This becomes another observed difference amongst others (e.g. wing shape) pointing to the two-species conclusion.

During mating displays, the males' wings may also make dry, crackling sounds; further research has investigated the use of these wing noises in potentially startling predators or would-be nest parasites (e.g. shiny cowbird).

== Distribution and habitat ==
Fork-tailed flycatchers are usually found below 1000 m elevation where they occur in a wide variety of habitats including pastures, riparian forests, forest edges, mangroves, and open residential areas with scattered trees. During migration, however, T. savana may be found in an even broader range of habitats.

Its breeding range is from central Mexico to central Argentina. In most of this range, it is usually found year-round, but in the southern parts of its range, it retreats northward for the winter.

During migration, fork-tailed flycatchers are quite gregarious, nesting in flocks of up to 10,000 individuals. This species is known to wander widely. It is spotted almost annually in the eastern United States seaboard and Canada, normally around fall (September–November).

During migration, fork-tailed flycatchers have been observed flying accompanied by relative species such as eastern kingbirds and aggressively chasing off predators.

The nominate subspecies, T. s. savana, is found in central and southern Brazil, Bolivia, Paraguay, Uruguay, and Argentina (south to the Río Negro), and overwinters in Amazonia, a large portion of northern South America (i.e., within the Orinoco River Basin), and Trinidad and Tobago, occasionally appearing in the West Indies.

== Behavior ==
=== Breeding ===
Males perform aerial courtship displays involving swirling somersaults, twists, and flips, accompanied by buzzing calls to impress female counterparts. Males' long tail feathers are also used to impress potential mates. Breeding seasons are dependent on subspecies and location; breeding season ranges from late summer to mid-winter.

Fork-tailed flycatchers tend to build their cup nests in similar habitats to their hunting grounds (riparian forests, grasslands). They tend to prefer specific trees in specific geographic locations, such as Kielmeyera trees in central Brazil. The clutch is 1–3 eggs.

=== Diet ===
This species is primarily insectivorous. Fork-tailed flycatchers sally from their perches to eat flying insects or glean them off of leaves and fruit. When insects become less available in winter months, they have been observed eating fruits.

The fork-tailed flycatcher's long tail allows for quick turns and stops in their pursuit of flying prey. They can reach speeds up to 65 miles per hour (105 km/h).
