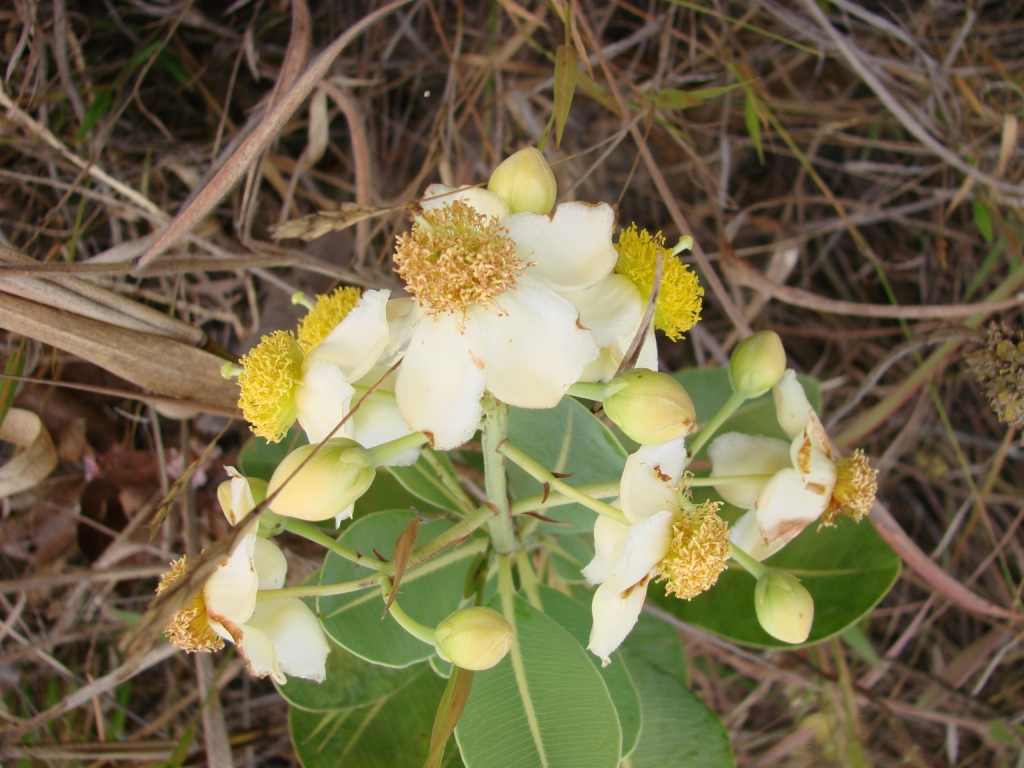

Scientific classification
- Kingdom: Plantae
- Clade: Tracheophytes
- Clade: Angiosperms
- Clade: Eudicots
- Clade: Rosids
- Order: Malpighiales
- Family: Calophyllaceae
- Genus: Kielmeyera
- Species: K. coriacea

Binomial name
- Kielmeyera coriacea Mart. et Zucc.

= Kielmeyera coriacea =

Species of tree

Kielmeyera coriacea (pau santo or boizinho) is a medicinal plant native to Cerrado and Pantanal vegetation in Brazil. It is also used as a honey plant and is one of the most characteristic and peculiar species of the Brazilian Cerrado. The species is notable for its conspicuous cork bark and has been suggested as a potential commercial substitute for traditional cork.

== Description ==
Kielmeyera coriacea is a small deciduous tree or shrub, typically reaching heights of 1-4 meters. It is described as a small, evergreen tree with a cylindrical but contorted trunk. The stem is covered by a conspicuous cork bark that can be several centimeters thick, with a periderm containing 1.1–1.8 cm of cork and only a few inclusions of phloem. The species belongs to the botanical family Calophyllaceae and is a plant of arboreal size that loses its leaves during a period of the year. Curiously, it is a plant quite common in cemeteries of the Federal District and its flowering coincides with the date of All Souls' Day, as if it also paid homage to those who rest there. The bark is approximately 3cm thick and yields a yellow resin that is described as emollient and tonic.

== Distribution and habitat ==
The native range of this species extends from eastern Bolivia to Brazil and Paraguay. It grows primarily in the seasonally dry tropical biome. In Brazil, it is native to multiple states including Goiás, São Paulo, Rondônia, Pará, Maranhão, Mato Grosso, Distrito Federal, Minas Gerais, Bahia, Paraná, Tocantins, Mato Grosso do Sul, and Piauí. Kielmeyera coriacea is natural to the savannah-type ecosystems of the Brazilian Cerrado. The species has been described as one of the most peculiar species of the Cerrado, a savanna-like vegetation of Central Brazil.

== Chemical composition ==
Kielmeyera coriacea is rich in bioactive compounds, particularly xanthones, which contribute to its medicinal properties.

=== Xanthones and phenolic compounds ===
Phytochemical investigation of dichloromethane extracts from the leaves and stems has revealed the presence of several xanthones, including ten xanthones, one biphenyl and two triterpenes. One xanthone and two triterpenes are new compounds. Recent studies have identified five 4-phenylcoumarins and three xanthones from K. coriacea, with some compounds being reported for the first time in the Calophyllaceae family and the genus Kielmeyera. The inner bark contains well-known potent antioxidants including protocatechuic acid, epicatechin and procyanidins A, B and C.

=== Essential oils ===
Essential oil analysis has shown that different parts of the plant contain varying chemical profiles. The leaf essential oil is rich in sesquiterpene hydrocarbons and oxygenated sesquiterpenes, with major compounds being germacrene-D (24.2%), (E)-caryophyllene (15.5%), and bicyclogermacrene (11.6%). The inner bark essential oil contains mainly alpha-copaene (14.9%) and alpha-(E)-bergamotene (13.0%).

=== Other compounds ===
The hexane root bark extract contains δ-tocotrienol and its dimer, which have shown cytotoxic activity against various human tumor cell lines.

== Traditional and medicinal uses ==
Kielmeyera coriacea is traditionally used by the native population of Brazil in the treatment of several tropical diseases including malaria, schistosomiasis, leishmaniasis, and fungal or bacterial infections. The plant is used in the treatment of toothache and was at one time much sought after for use in fomentations. It is added to bath water, and a yellow resin obtained from the plant is said to be emollient and tonic. The hydroethanolic extract of Kielmeyera coriacea also appears to act on the central nervous system in rats, showing anxiolytic and antidepressant effects.

== Pharmacological research ==
=== Antimicrobial activity ===
Studies have demonstrated that compounds isolated from K. coriacea, including the biphenyl aucuparin and various xanthones, show antimicrobial activities against Gram-positive bacteria. Aucuparin and 1,3,7-trihydroxy-2-(3-methylbut-2-enyl)-xanthone showed antimicrobial activities against Bacillus subtilis with MIC values of 3.12μg/mL and 12.5μg/mL, respectively.

=== Anticancer potential ===
Research has shown that K. coriacea exhibits antitumor activity both in vitro and in vivo against different tumor cell lines, indicating it is a promising medicinal plant in cancer therapy. δ-tocotrienols isolated from the species displayed cytotoxicity against human tumor cell lines including melanoma, colon, leukemia, and glioblastoma.

=== Other bioactivities ===
The inner bark has demonstrated antioxidant properties and inhibitory activities against α-amylase and lipase, suggesting potential applications in managing oxidative stress, hyperglycemia, and hyperlipidemia.

== Cork properties and economic uses ==
Kielmeyera coriacea is mentioned in the literature as the main tree species which produces cork in the Brazilian Cerrado. The species has been studied as a potential source for industrial cork, as all commercial cork currently comes from a single species, the cork-oak (Quercus suber), which is limited to the western Mediterranean region. The cork cells have a distribution similar to Quercus suber, with 4 to 8 sides and a predominance of hexagonal cells. The cell walls have an average height of 40 to 70 μm and thickness of 1.5 to 2.0 μm. The cork tissue may be detached from the stem and the tree has a high regeneration capacity of the periderm and its cork; this has led to suggestions of exploitation with successive cork removals at 5- to 6-year rotations. The species has economic interest for the production of wood, cellulose, and tannin for the leather industry.

== Taxonomy ==
The species has several accepted infraspecific varieties including K. coriacea var. coriacea, var. glabripes Saddi, var. guiaensis Saddi, var. intermedia Saddi, var. pseudocoriacea Saddi, and var. pseudotomentosa Saddi. Kielmeyera coriacea is part of what is known as the "K. coriacea complex," a group of morphologically variable and closely related taxa that have been the subject of taxonomic confusion. Molecular studies using microsatellite markers have helped clarify species boundaries within this complex and detected introgressive hybridization processes.

== Conservation status ==
According to recent assessments, the predicted extinction risk for Kielmeyera coriacea is "not threatened" with confident certainty. However, like other Cerrado plants, this species suffers strong anthropogenic pressure.
