= Antimony (disambiguation) =

Antimony is a chemical element with symbol Sb and atomic number 51.

Antimony may also refer to:

- Antimony, Utah, a town in Garfield County, Utah
- Antimony Mountain, a summit in British Columbia
- Antimony Peak, peak located in the San Emigdio Mountains of California
- Antimony Carver, a character in the webcomic Gunnerkrigg Court
- Antimony Price, a character in the InCryptid novel series
- Antimony biochemical language

== See also ==
- Antinomy
- Sb (disambiguation)
- Isotopes of antimony
- Native antimony (mineral)
