= Kielmeyera peruviana =

Conservation status
- Critically Endangered (IUCN 3.1)

Scientific classification
- Kingdom: Plantae
- Clade: Tracheophytes
- Clade: Angiosperms
- Clade: Eudicots
- Clade: Rosids
- Order: Malpighiales
- Family: Calophyllaceae
- Genus: Kielmeyera
- Species: K. peruviana

Binomial name
- Kielmeyera peruviana Saddi

Species of plant

Kielmeyera peruviana is a species of flowering plant in the Calophyllaceae family. It is a small tree, up to 6 meters tall, which is endemic to the Department of San Martin in northern Peru. It grows in lower montane rain forest (Yungas) from 1,200 to 1,600 meters elevation.

The species was described by Nagib Saddi in 1984.
