= SB =

SB or Sb may refer to:

== Places ==
=== United States ===
- San Bernardino, California, a city
- Santa Barbara, California, a city
- South Burlington, Vermont, a city

=== Elsewhere ===
- Saint Pierre and Miquelon, a territory of France (FIPS PUB 10-4 territory code SB)
- Solomon Islands, a country (ISO 3166 country code SB)
- Sibiu County, a county in Romania

== Organisations ==
- Special Branch, of UK and some Commonwealth police
- Służba Bezpieczeństwa, secret police in communist Poland
- Sluzhba Bezpeky, WWII Ukrainian partisan underground intelligence service
- Shaw Brothers Studio, a Hong Kong movie company
- Statistics Bureau (Japan)
- Šiaulių bankas, a Lithuanian commercial bank
- Sarvajana Balaya, Sri Lankan political alliance

== Science and technology ==
- SB buffer, for electrophoresis
- Antimony, symbol Sb, a chemical element
- Barred spiral galaxy, in astronomy
- Scientiæ Baccalaureus or Bachelor of Science, an academic degree
- Spectroscopic binary stars, designated SB1 and SB2
- Stilb (unit) (symbol sb), a unit of luminance
- sideband
- Spina bifida

=== Computing ===
- .sb file, the file format for Scratch Projects
  - .sb2 file and .sb3, the file formats for Scratch 2 and 3
- .sb, Internet country code top-level domain for Solomon Islands
- sb, Store Byte, an RISC-V instruction

== Sport and games ==
- Sun Belt Conference, an NCAA Division I conference
- Nike SB, skateboarding shoes
- "Season's Best", an athletics abbreviation
- Stolen base, in baseball
- Sonneborn–Berger score, a scoring system often used to break ties in chess tournaments
- Sundby Boldklub, a football club in Denmark
- The Super Bowl, an American championship football game

== Transportation ==
- Aircalin (IATA airline code)
- Sailing barge (ship prefix)
- Skagensbanen (the Skagen Railway), a Danish railway line and company
- South Buffalo Railway (reporting code)
- Surabaya Kota railway station, Surabaya, East Java, Indonesia (station code: SB)
- Suroboyo Bus in Surabaya, Indonesia
- Tupolev SB, a Soviet bomber of World War II
- Toyota SB, car
- SB craft, an Imperial Japanese Army variant of the Imperial Japanese Navy's No. 101-class landing ship
- Surabaya (trishaws/rickshaws prefix SB)

== People ==
- José Ronaldo do Nascimento (born 1966), a Brazilian handball player known as SB

== Other uses ==
- Special Warfare Boat Operator rating, US Navy
- Senate Bill, typically coded like "SB 1234"
- Sonderbehandlung, German Nazi era euphemism for mass murder
- Substantive, or noun, in some languages
- Swagbucks, a rewards company by Prodege

== See also ==
- BS (disambiguation)
- B (disambiguation)
- S (disambiguation)
- SBS (disambiguation)
