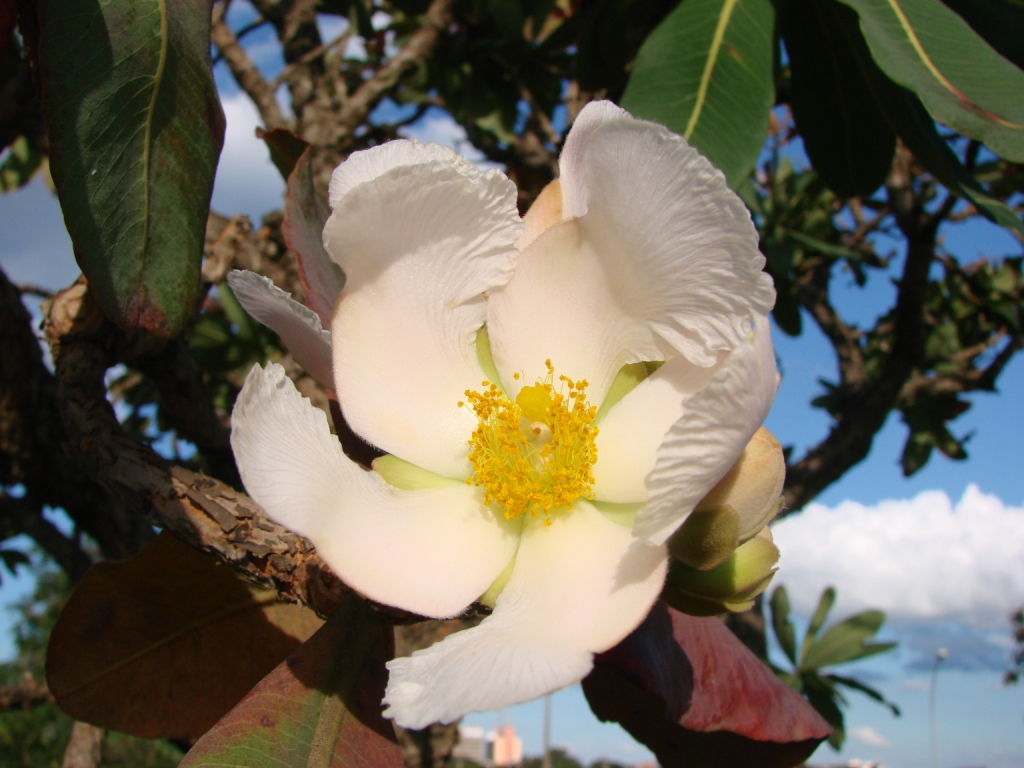

Conservation status
- Least Concern (IUCN 3.1)

Scientific classification
- Kingdom: Plantae
- Clade: Tracheophytes
- Clade: Angiosperms
- Clade: Eudicots
- Clade: Rosids
- Order: Malpighiales
- Family: Calophyllaceae
- Genus: Kielmeyera
- Species: K. speciosa

Binomial name
- Kielmeyera speciosa A.St.-Hil., A.Juss. & Cambess. (1827)

Synonyms
- Kielmeyera speciosa var. major A.St.-Hil.; Kielmeyera speciosa var. minor A.St.-Hil.; Kielmeyera speciosa var. typica Wawra

= Kielmeyera speciosa =

Species of flowering plant

Kielmeyera speciosa is a species of flowering plant in the genus Kielmeyera. It is a shrub or tree native to central Brazil, where it grows in Cerrado savanna.
