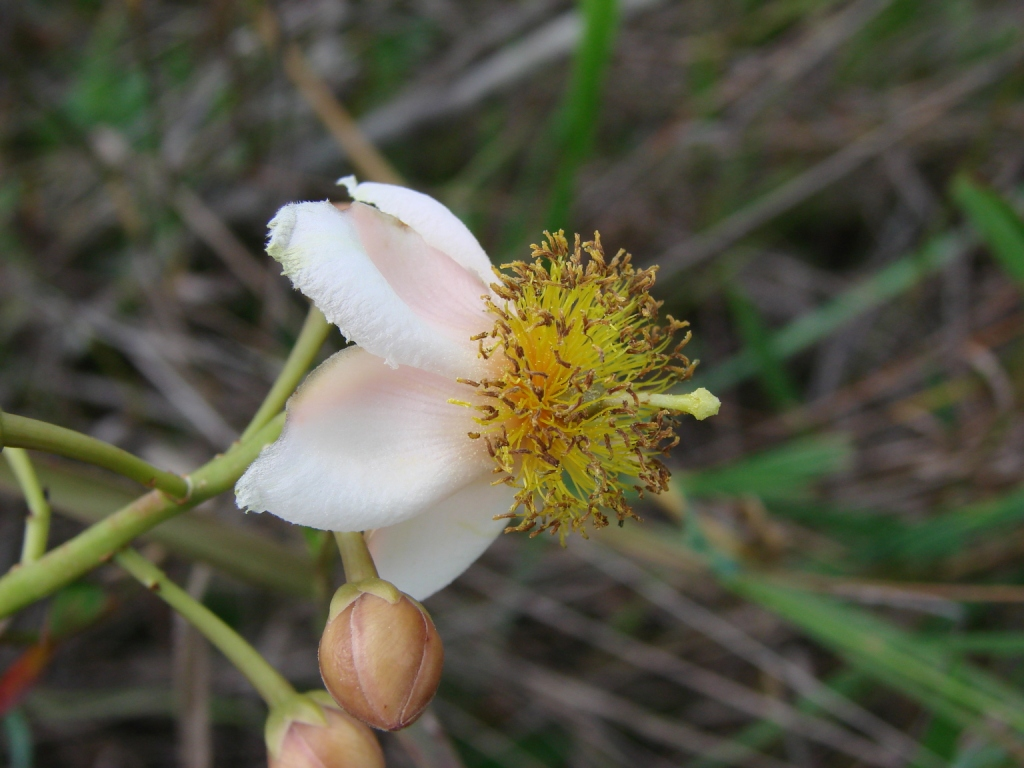

Scientific classification
- Kingdom: Plantae
- Clade: Tracheophytes
- Clade: Angiosperms
- Clade: Eudicots
- Clade: Rosids
- Order: Malpighiales
- Family: Calophyllaceae
- Genus: Kielmeyera
- Species: K. neriifolia

Binomial name
- Kielmeyera neriifolia Cambess. (1828)

= Kielmeyera neriifolia =

Species of flowering plant

Kielmeyera neriifolia is a species of Kielmeyera from Brazil.
