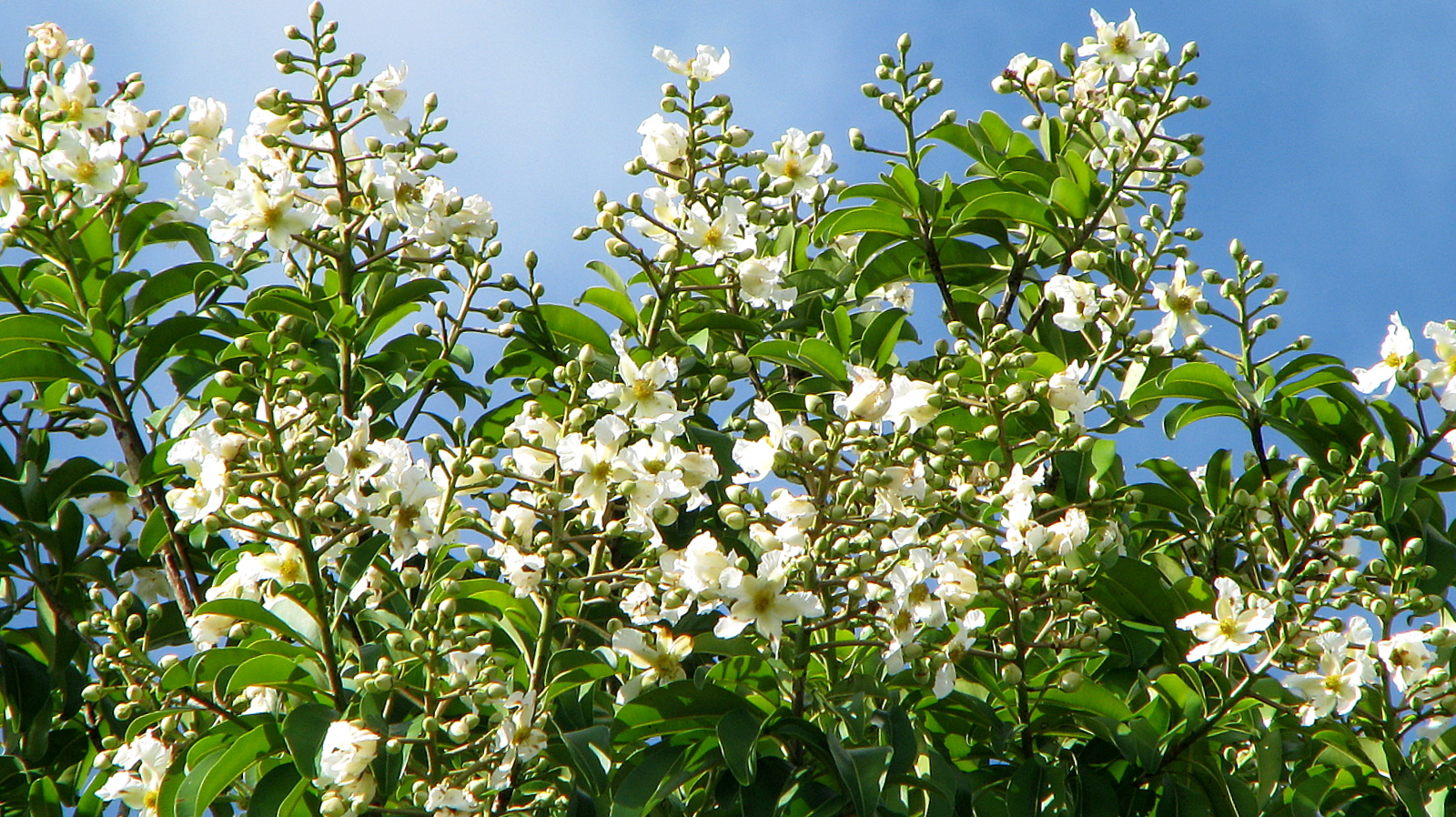

Conservation status
- Least Concern (IUCN 3.1)

Scientific classification
- Kingdom: Plantae
- Clade: Tracheophytes
- Clade: Angiosperms
- Clade: Eudicots
- Clade: Rosids
- Order: Malpighiales
- Family: Calophyllaceae
- Genus: Kielmeyera
- Species: K. neglecta

Binomial name
- Kielmeyera neglecta Saddi 1984

Varieties
- Kielmeyera neglecta var. neglecta; Kielmeyera neglecta var. neglectiifolia Saddi

= Kielmeyera neglecta =

Species of flowering plant

Kielmeyera neglecta, commonly known as caga-matéria, is a species of flowering plant in the family Calophyllaceae. It is a tree native to the states of Alagoas, Bahia, and Sergipe in northeastern Brazil. It is native to restinga (tropical moist forest growing on sand) and campo rupestre.

Two varieties are accepted:

- Kielmeyera neglecta var. neglecta
- Kielmeyera neglecta var. neglectiifolia Saddi

== Gallery ==
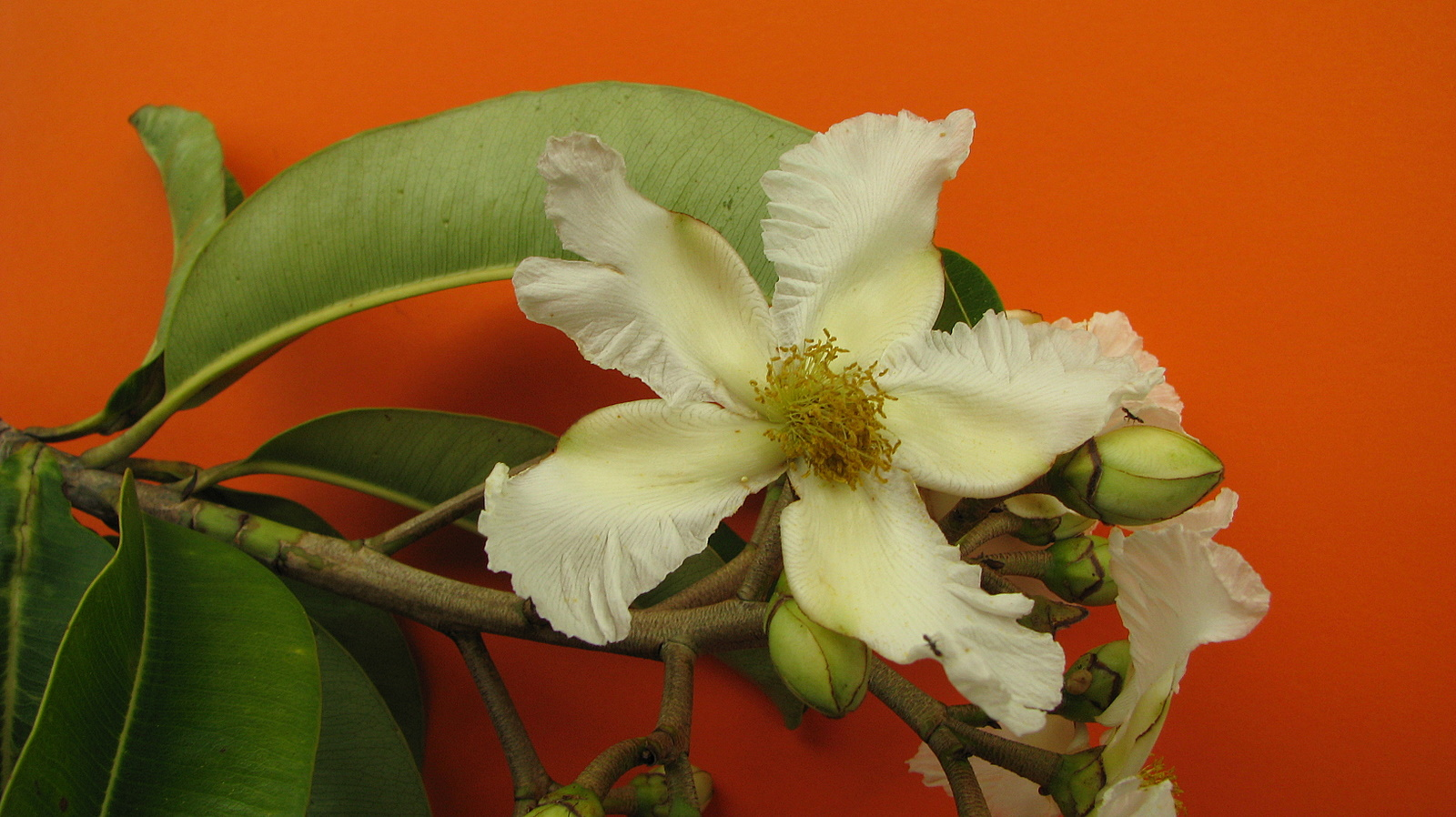

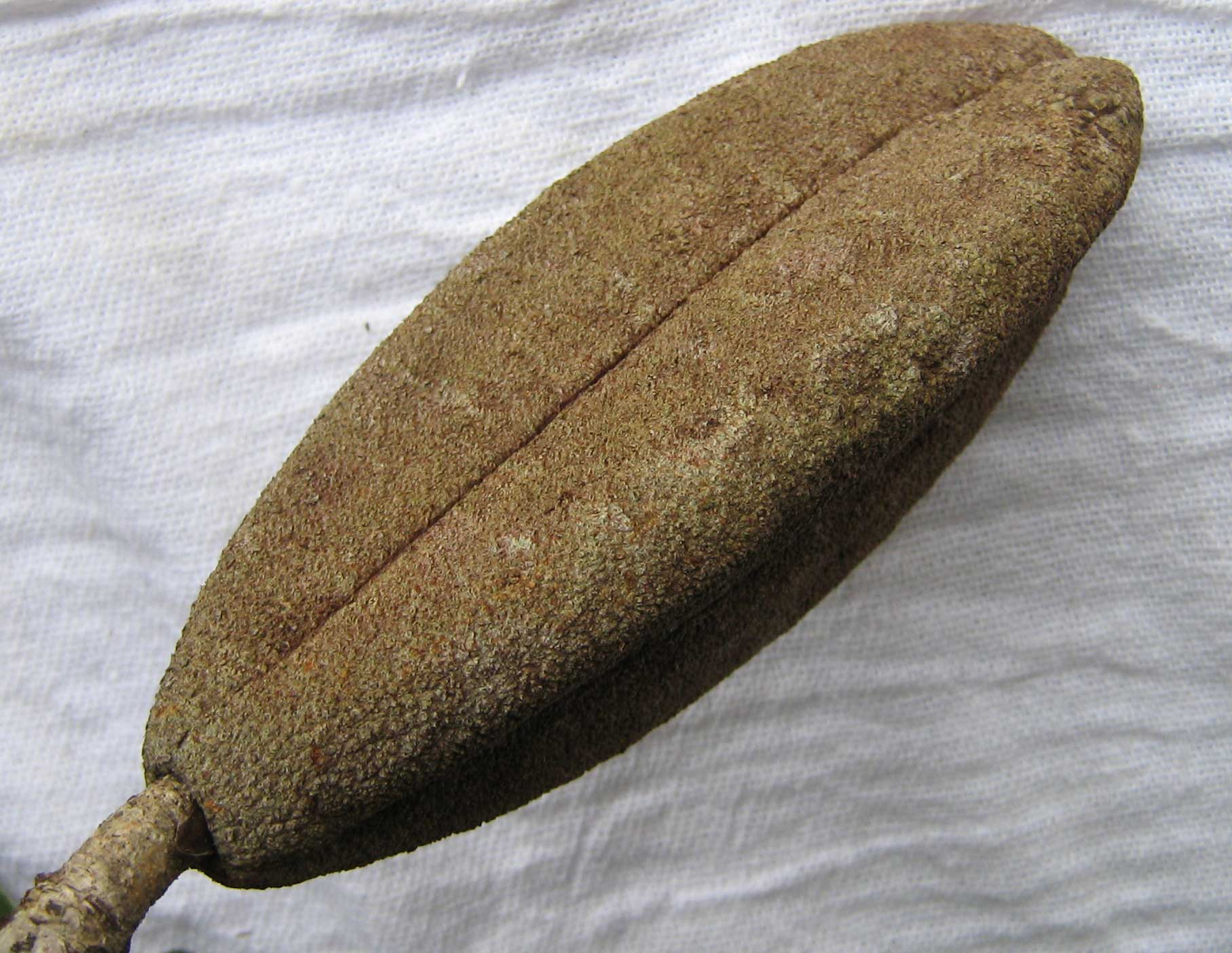

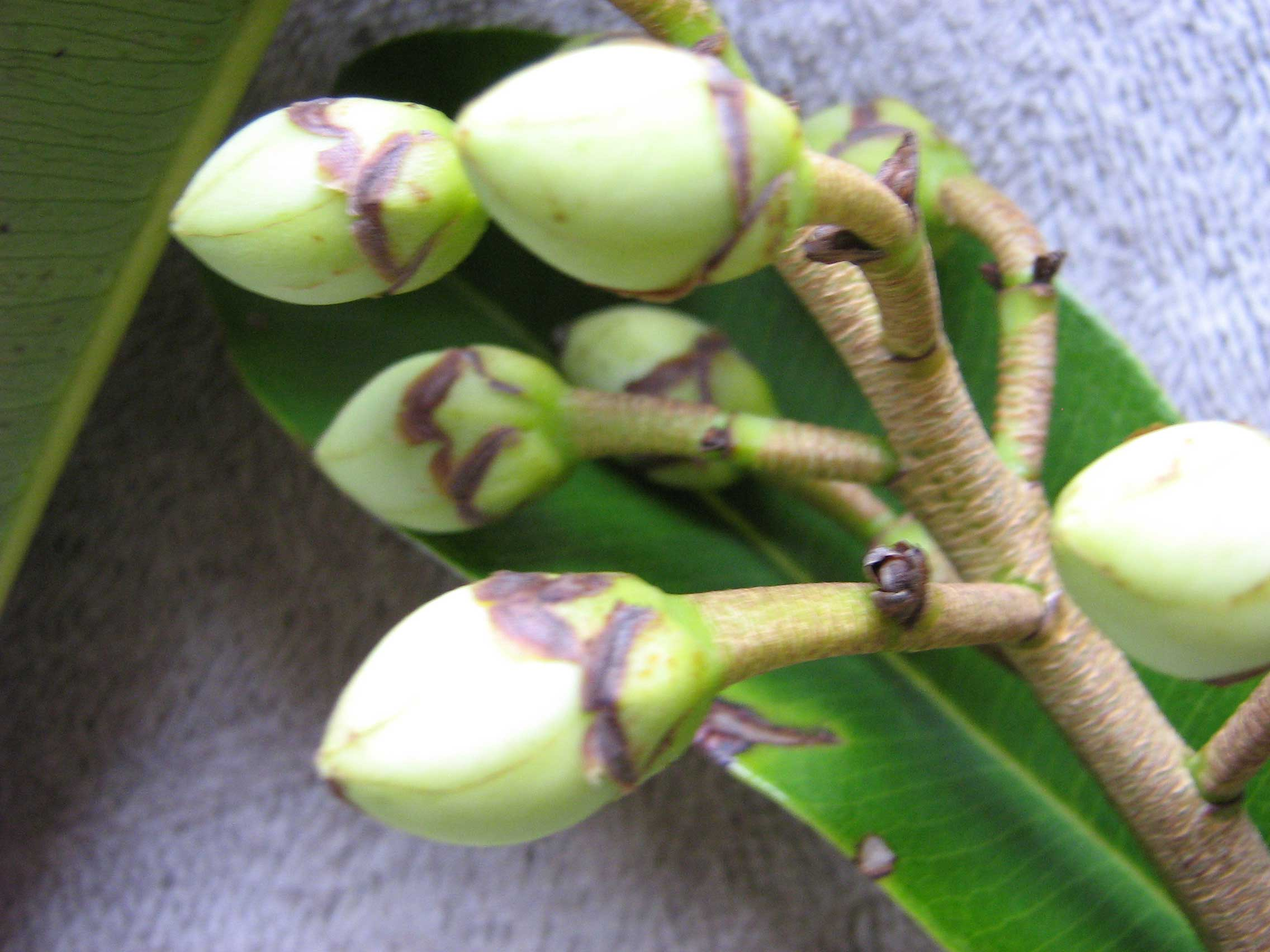
