= Billy Boyle =

Irish actor and entertainer

- Occupations: Actor, singer
- Years active: 1962–present

Billy Boyle is an Irish actor and singer on British film, television and stage. His recording career included five 45 rpm singles for the Decca and Columbia labels, including the novelty song "My Baby's Crazy 'Bout Elvis" (Decca F 11503) in 1962. He is a veteran of the West End stage, having played leading roles in over 15 hit shows.

In his first West End musical, Maggie May, he was nominated as best newcomer. Gower Champion then chose him to play Barnaby in Hello Dolly at The Theatre Royal Drury Lane. He appeared in Canterbury Tales at the Phoenix Theatre as The Clerk of Oxford. Harold Hobson, The Times critic said, "He was a breath of fresh air in the West-End". He went on to play leading roles in No Sex Please, We're British, Billy, What's a Nice Country, The Rivals, Love, Lust, & Marriage, Some Like It Hot, Disney's Beauty and the Beast, and in the original cast of Dirty Dancing. Lately he has appeared as Grandpa George and Grandpa Joe in Charlie and The Chocolate Factory at Drury Lane. In 2010, he was the Mysterious Man in the Regent’s Park Open Air Theatre production of Into the Woods.

In 2016, he was Major Bouvier and Norman Vincent Peale in the smash hit Grey Gardens. He followed this playing Arvide in Guys and Dolls at the Phoenix Theatre in the West End. He has had his own very successful television series in Ireland, It's Billy Boyle, as well as leading roles in Trail of Guilt, the award-winning The Grass Arena and The Bretts, as well as many guest appearances in EastEnders, The Professionals, Coronation Street, Father Ted, etc.

In the late 1970s, Boyle was cast as Ronald McDonald in the European TV commercials and in all print media for the fast-food chain McDonald's. He was the last 'straight man' to Basil Brush on BBC1's The Basil Brush Show and later presented Dance Crazy for ITV, on the history of dance, with Lesley Judd. He was seen in Dirk Gently and Lead Balloon.

His films include Stanley Kubrick's Barry Lyndon, Groupie Girl, Side by Side, Wild Geese II, The Scarlet and the Black, Round Ireland with a Fridge and A United Kingdom.

== Filmography ==
| Year | Title | Role | Notes |
|---|---|---|---|
| 1970 | Groupie Girl | Wesley | |
| 1975 | Barry Lyndon | Nora's brother #2 | |
| 1975 | Side by Side | Gary | |
| 1985 | Wild Geese II | Devenish | |
| 1987-1988 | The Bretts | Hegarty | 16 episodes |
| 1989 | Dead Bang | Priest | |
| 1990 | It's Billy Boyle | | |
| 1992 | Screen Two | Mr. Healy | Episode: "The Grass Arena" |
| 1993 | EastEnders | Danny Taurus | 12 episodes |
| 1996 | Father Ted | Chatback Priest | Episode: "A Christmassy Ted" |
| 1999 | Shergar | Carrigan | |
| 1999 | Trail of Guilt | | TV series |
| 2002 | The Basil Brush Show | | TV series |
| 2008 | Coronation Street | Father Maguire | 2 episodes |
| 2009 | Dance Crazy | | |
| 2010 | Dirk Gently | Harry Jordan | Episode: "Pilot" |
| 2010 | Round Ireland with a Fridge | Donal | |
| 2011 | Into the Woods | Mysterious Man | |
| 2011 | Lead Balloon | Priest | Episode: "Shoddy" |
| 2016 | A United Kingdom | Reverend James Manners | |
| 2017 | National Theatre Live: Follies | Theodore Whitman | |
| 2023 | Coronation Street | Glyn Young | |
| 2025 | Silent Witness | Charles Mead | |

== Stage ==
| Title | Role |
|---|---|
| Maggie May | |
| Hello, Dolly! | Barnaby |
| Canterbury Tales | The Clerk of Oxford |
| Some Like it Hot | Jerry/Daphne |
| No Sex Please, We're British | |
| Billy | |
| What's a Nice Country | |
| The Rivals | |
| Love, Lust, & Marriage | |
| Beauty and the Beast | Maurice |
| Into the Woods | The Mysterious Man |
| Charlie and the Chocolate Factory | Grandpa George/Grandpa Joe |
| Grey Gardens | Major Bouvier/Norman Vincent Peale |
| Guys and Dolls | Arvide |
| Follies | Theodore Whitman |
