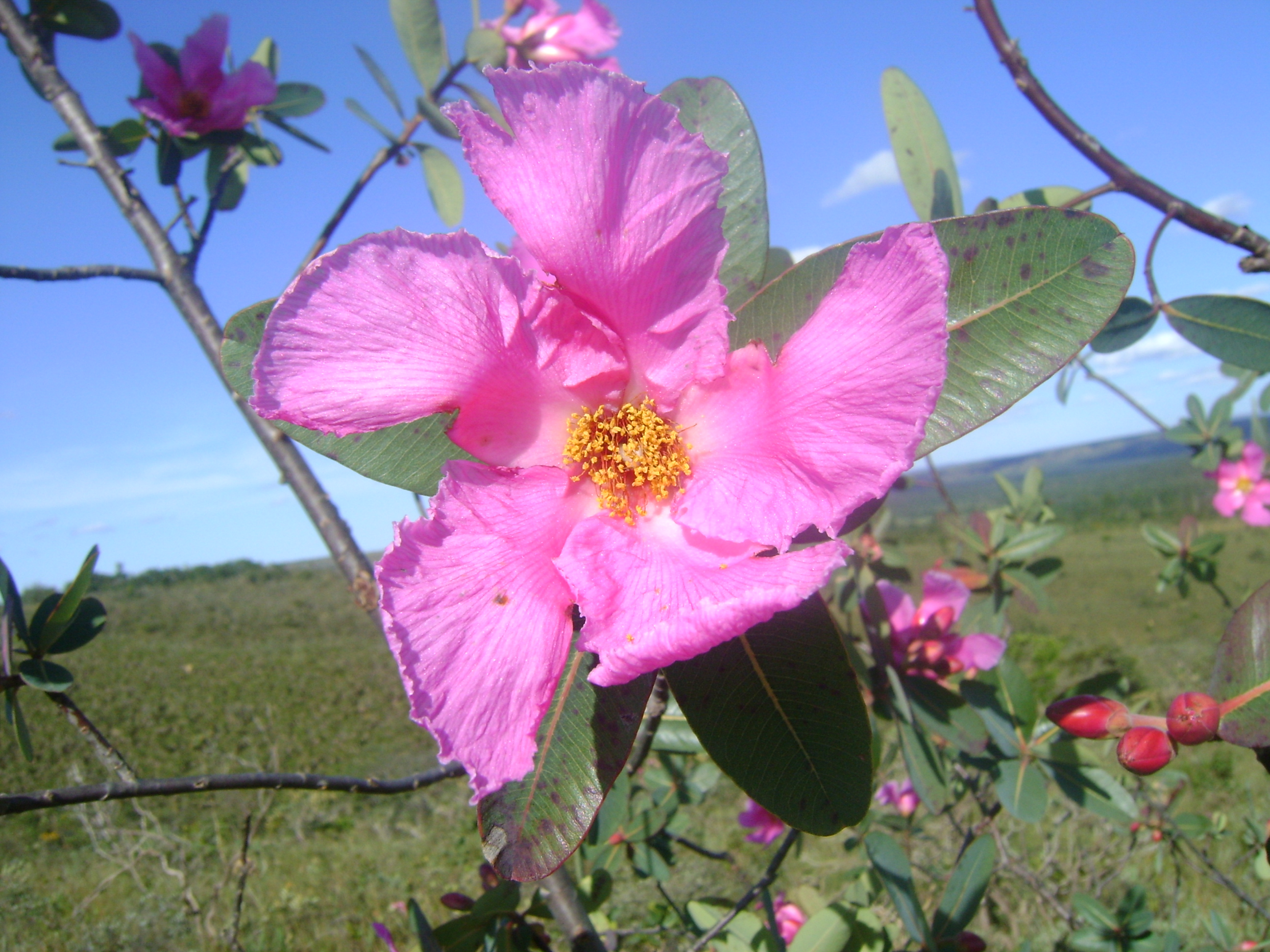

Scientific classification
- Kingdom: Plantae
- Clade: Tracheophytes
- Clade: Angiosperms
- Clade: Eudicots
- Clade: Rosids
- Order: Malpighiales
- Family: Calophyllaceae
- Genus: Kielmeyera
- Species: K. rubriflora

Binomial name
- Kielmeyera rubriflora Cambess. (1828)

= Kielmeyera rubriflora =

Species of flowering plant

Kielmeyera rubriflora is a species of Kielmeyera from Bolivia to Brazil.
