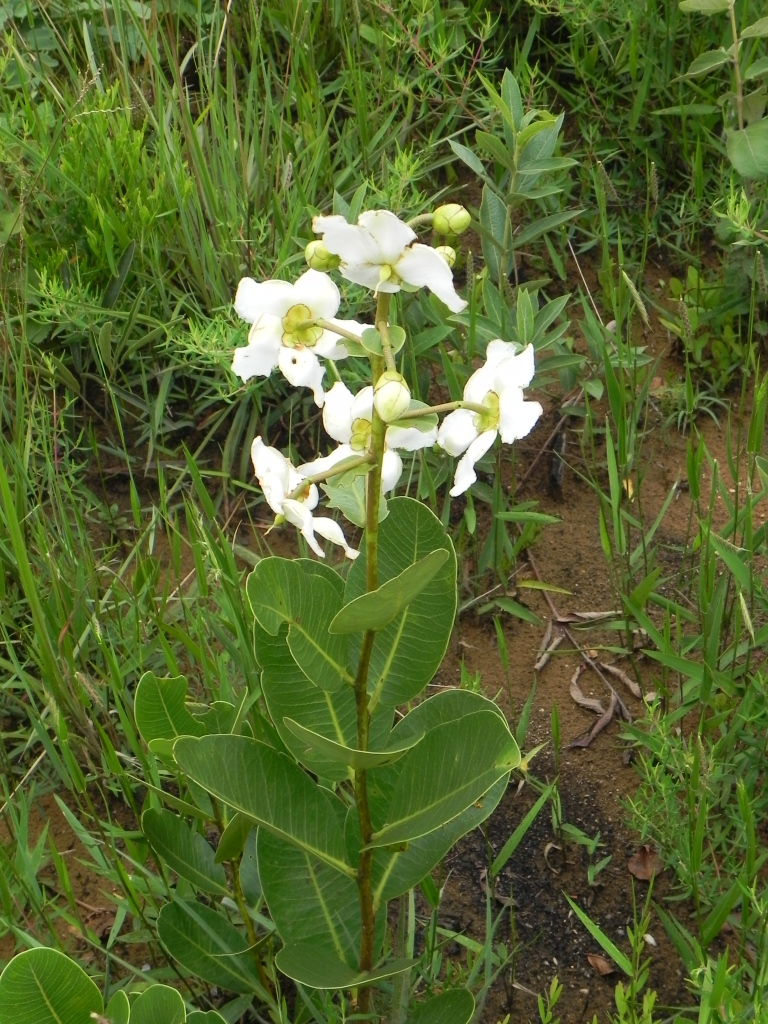

Scientific classification
- Kingdom: Plantae
- Clade: Tracheophytes
- Clade: Angiosperms
- Clade: Eudicots
- Clade: Rosids
- Order: Malpighiales
- Family: Calophyllaceae
- Genus: Kielmeyera
- Species: K. variabilis

Binomial name
- Kielmeyera variabilis Mart. et Zucc.

= Kielmeyera variabilis =

Species of tree

Kielmeyera variabilis (malva-do-campo or pau santo) is tree growing to a height of 3–6 meters, found in savannah regions of eastern and central Brazil (the Cerrado). K. variabilis is traditionally used in folk medicine to treat tropical diseases including schistosomiasis, leishmaniasis, malaria, as well as fungal and bacterial infections.

K. variabilis has been shown to contain three flavonols and a biflavone known to show antioxidant activity: quercitrin, quercetin-3-O-β-glucoside, quercetin-3-O-β-galactoside; and podocarpusflavone A (the biflavone).

In 2019 a new acylphoroglucinol isolated from the branches of the tree showed activity against Methicillin-resistant Staphylococcus aureus (MRSA).
