= Exo-alpha-bergamotene synthase =

Enzyme

exo-α-bergamotene synthase

Identifiers
- EC no.: 4.2.3.81

Databases
- IntEnz: IntEnz view
- BRENDA: BRENDA entry
- ExPASy: NiceZyme view
- KEGG: KEGG entry
- MetaCyc: metabolic pathway
- PRIAM: profile
- PDB structures: RCSB PDB PDBe PDBsum
Search
- PMC: articles
- PubMed: articles
- NCBI: proteins

exo-α-Bergamotene synthase (EC 4.2.3.81, trans-α-bergamotene synthase, LaBERS (gene)) is an enzyme with systematic name (2E,6E)-farnesyl diphosphate lyase (cyclizing, (–)-exo-α-bergamotene-forming). This enzyme catalyses the following chemical reaction:

(2E,6E)-farnesyl diphosphate $\rightleftharpoons$ (–)-exo-α-bergamotene + diphosphate

The enzyme synthesizes a mixture of sesquiterpenoids from (2E,6E)-farnesyl diphosphate.
