= Side by Side (Lynsey de Paul song) =

"Side By Side" (a.k.a. "Side By Side (Together)" is the theme song for the film of the same name. It was written by Lynsey de Paul and Barry Blue in 1975 at the invitation of the film's writer and producer Bruce Beresford, and has a doo-wop, retro-style style. The song is performed by the male-female duo "Twogether", (according to some sources Twogether is Stephanie de Sykes who plays Julia in the film and Billy Boyle who plays Gary). It was recorded at Marquee Studios, produced by de Paul and Blue and engineered by John Eden for GTO Records. The song featured on the 1977 soundtrack album for the film, where it is featured as track 4 and is listed as "Side By Side (Together)". The song is a love song about standing together but also alludes to the film's subject, which is the fate of two nightclubs that are next door to each other and in competition since the local council has discovered that, by ancient law, there can only be one nightclub in the town. A clip from the movie and theme song was featured on the ITV show Look Alive. A DVD of the film also featuring the theme music as well as other songs from the movie soundtrack was released on 24 June 2013.
