= Side by Side (1975 film) =

1975 British film by Bruce Beresford

- Directed by: Bruce Beresford
- Written by: Bruce Beresford; Garry Chambers; Ron Inkpen; Peter James
- Produced by: Drummond Challis
- Starring: Terry-Thomas; Barry Humphries; Stephanie de Sykes
- Cinematography: Harvey Harrison
- Edited by: Ray Lovejoy
- Music by: John Shakespeare; Derek Warne
- Production company: GTO
- Distributed by: GTO
- Release date: 26 December 1975 (UK)
- Running time: 84 minutes
- Country: United Kingdom
- Language: English

Side by Side is a 1975 pop comedy film, directed by Bruce Beresford. It tells the story of two rival nightclub owners played by Terry-Thomas and Billy Boyle. The cast also includes Barry Humphries, Stephanie de Sykes, Frank Thornton and many contemporary pop artists such as The Rubettes, Mud and Kenny. Beresford described the film as "awful" and said it had "the worst script I've ever read". It was released on DVD on 29 July 2013.

== Plot ==
Set in the fictitious English borough of Sludgely, the film centres on two rival nightclubs, located side by side. The decrepit Golden Nugget, which features strip shows and music hall variety turns, is run by Max Nugget (Terry-Thomas), assisted by his hypochondriac nephew Rodney (Barry Humphries), while Sound City is a pop music club, run by Gary (Billy Boyle). A local magistrate rules that only one club's licence will be renewed at the end of the month. The two clubs then attempt to improve their entertainment by attracting top acts. The film culminates in a comedic brawl in which a dividing wall is smashed, resulting in a merger between the two venues.

== Cast ==
- Barry Humphries as Rodney
- Terry-Thomas as Max Nugget
- Stephanie de Sykes as Julia
- Billy Boyle as Gary
- Dave Mount as Flip
- Frank Thornton as Inspector Crumb
- Jennifer Guy as Violet
- Sheila Collings as Bessie
- Geoffrey Sumner as Magistrate
- Neil McCarthy as Alf (uncredited)

Also starring The Rubettes, Mud, Kenny, Mac and Katie Kissoon, Desmond Dekker and Fox as themselves. Music hall comedian Joe Baker also performs as himself.

== Production ==
Side By Side was the third feature film directed by Australian Bruce Beresford, who had previously found success in England by teaming up with his compatriot Barry Humphries for the bawdy comedy The Adventures of Barry McKenzie (1972) and its sequel, Barry McKenzie Holds His Own (1974). Beresford's biographer Peter Coleman wrote that Beresford made Side By Side for the money and because it was difficult for him to obtain work after the Barry McKenzie films. The movie was funded by the film division of Laurence Myers' GTO Records. Producer Drummond Challis had worked previously with Beresford and Humphries on Barry McKenzie Holds His Own. In a 2017 memoir of his film career, Beresford tersely described the film as "a lamentable rock musical".

== Music ==
A tie-in soundtrack album was released in 1977 under the title Original Rocking Hits From The Film "Side By Side" on the Pickwick Records label (SHM 902), and featured Stephanie de Sykes performing her highest UK charting song, "Born With a Smile on My Face". The late Dave Mount, drummer of Mud, had a starring role in the film. The artist "Twogether" that performs the "Side By Side" film theme, may actually be Lynsey de Paul and Barry Blue, the song's composers. The film closes with a singalong rendition of the popular standard of the same name, Side by Side, led by Mud and Hello with Barry Humphries on piano.

== Critical reception ==
Graham McCann's 2009 biography of Terry-Thomas, Bounder!, describes the film as "a low-budget piece of nonsense" which was savaged by critics "both for its 'marshmallow plot' and the 'evident lack of enthusiasm' shown by most of its cast."

Musical film author Stephen Glynn wrote that Side by Side used the two clubs' rivalry "as an excuse to feature of a roster of Glam acts ... filmed in performance mode with no discernible difference to a Thursday night episode of Top of the Pops".

== See also ==
- List of British films of 1975
