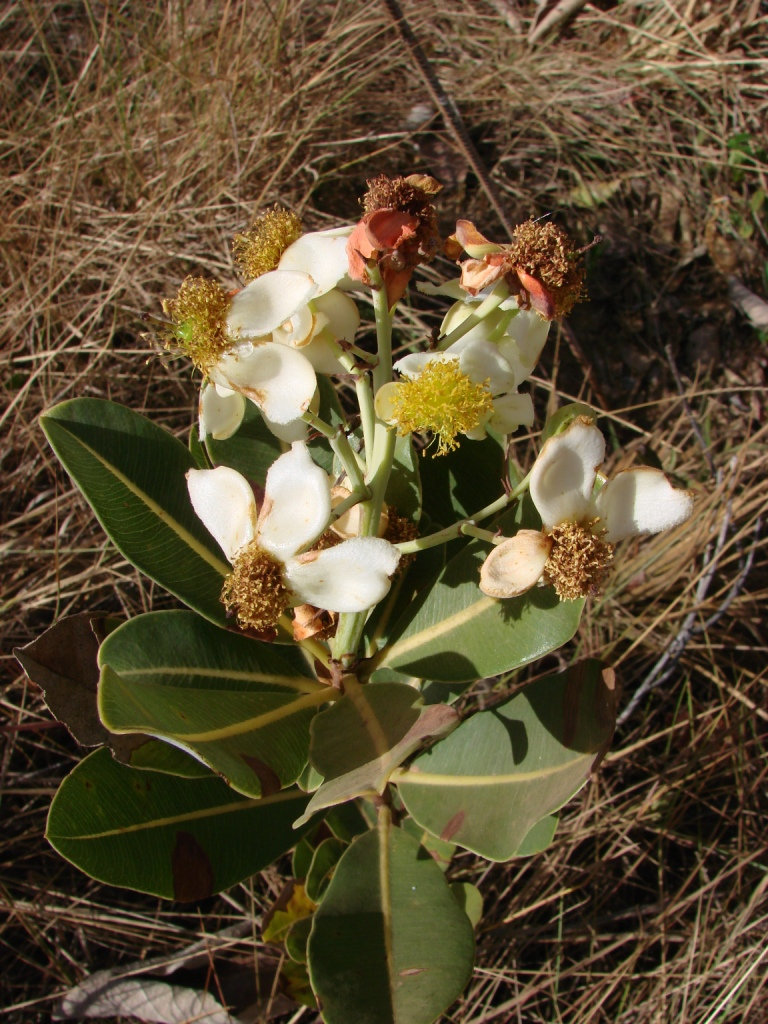
- Kielmeyera variabilis

Scientific classification
- Kingdom: Plantae
- Clade: Embryophytes
- Clade: Tracheophytes
- Clade: Spermatophytes
- Clade: Angiosperms
- Clade: Eudicots
- Clade: Rosids
- Order: Malpighiales
- Family: Calophyllaceae
- Genus: Kielmeyera; Mart. & Zucc.

Species
- 55; see text

Synonyms
- Martinieria Vell.

= Kielmeyera =

Genus of flowering plants

Kielmeyera is a genus of flowering plants in the family Calophyllaceae. It is native to South America, with 55 species native to Bolivia, Brazil, Paraguay, and Peru, and a large occurrence in the Brazilian cerrado.

== Species ==
55 species are accepted.

- Kielmeyera abdita Saddi
- Kielmeyera albopunctata Saddi
- Kielmeyera altissima Saddi
- Kielmeyera anisosepala Saddi
- Kielmeyera appariciana Saddi
- Kielmeyera argentea Choisy
- Kielmeyera aureovinosa M.Gomes
- Kielmeyera bifaria Saddi
- Kielmeyera cataractae R.J.Trad
- Kielmeyera colibri R.J.Trad
- Kielmeyera coriacea Mart.
- Kielmeyera corymbosa Mart.
- Kielmeyera cuspidata Saddi
- Kielmeyera decipiens Saddi
- Kielmeyera divergens Saddi
- Kielmeyera doceana R.J.Trad
- Kielmeyera elata Saddi
- Kielmeyera excelsa Cambess.
- Kielmeyera fatimae R.J.Trad
- Kielmeyera ferruginosa A.P.B.Santos & Trad
- Kielmeyera gracilis Wawra
- Kielmeyera grandiflora (Wawra) Saddi
- Kielmeyera humifusa Cambess.
- Kielmeyera inopinata R.J.Trad
- Kielmeyera insignis Saddi
- Kielmeyera itacarensis Saddi
- Kielmeyera juruenensis Saddi
- Kielmeyera lathrophyton Saddi
- Kielmeyera marauensis Saddi
- Kielmeyera membranacea Casar.
- Kielmeyera neglecta Saddi
- Kielmeyera neriifolia Cambess.
- Kielmeyera obtecta Saddi
- Kielmeyera occhioniana Saddi
- Kielmeyera oreophila R.J.Trad
- Kielmeyera paniculata Rusby
- Kielmeyera peruviana Saddi
- Kielmeyera petiolaris Mart. & Zucc.
- Kielmeyera pulcherrima L.B.Sm.
- Kielmeyera pumila Pohl
- Kielmeyera regalis Saddi
- Kielmeyera reticulata Saddi
- Kielmeyera rizziniana Saddi
- Kielmeyera rosea Mart. & Zucc.
- Kielmeyera rubriflora Cambess.
- Kielmeyera rufotomentosa Saddi
- Kielmeyera rugosa Choisy
- Kielmeyera rupestris Duarte
- Kielmeyera sigillata Saddi
- Kielmeyera similis Saddi
- Kielmeyera speciosa A.St.-Hil., A.Juss. & Cambess.
- Kielmeyera stevensii R.J.Trad
- Kielmeyera tomentosa Cambess.
- Kielmeyera trichophora Saddi
- Kielmeyera variabilis Mart. & Zucc.
