= Social Boston Sports =

- Company type: Private
- Industry: Sports Club
- Founded: January 2007
- Headquarters: Boston, Massachusetts, US
- Key people: Justin Obey, Brian Shaw, John Sharry, and Frank Knippenberg
- Website: www.socialbostonsports.com

Social Boston Sports (SBS) was created in January 2007 by four professionals, Justin Obey, Brian Shaw, John Sharry, and Frank Knippenberg. SBS is an organization that provides a way for young professionals to become involved in events, parties, and coed recreational sports and activities throughout Boston.
