= Special Book Services =

Language teaching materials distributor, Brazil

- Industry: Book distribution
- Genre: Educational texts
- Founded: 1996
- Headquarters: São Paulo, Brazil

Special Book Services (SBS) is a distributor of language teaching materials in Brazil. The company maintains warehouse facilities in São Paulo and a chain of over 24 SBS bookshops. The entrepreneur Sabina Pino Zea manages this company from NYC and distributes thousands of material around the world.

The company was founded in 1996. As of 2014, the company was the exclusive distributor of Macmillan Publishers books in Brazil, but it ceased to be the exclusive distributor after 2016.
