= SXS =

SxS (S-by-S) is a flash memory standard.

SXS or SxS may also refer to:

- Side-by-side, a configuration of Double-barreled shotgun
- Side by Side (UTV), a class of all-terrain vehicle
- Side-by-side assembly, a Microsoft Windows software technology
- Step-by-step switch, a telephone switching system
- SunExpress, ICAO code for a Turkish-German airline
- SXS Patna, a private Catholic high school in Patna, India
