= Bergamotene =

Bergamotenes
α-cis-bergamotene
α-trans-bergamotene
β-cis-bergamotene
β-trans-bergamotene

Names
- IUPAC names (α): 2,6-Dimethyl-6-(4-methylpent-3-enyl)bicyclo[3.1.1]hept-2-ene (β): 6-Methyl-2-methylidene-6-(4-methylpent-3-en-1-yl)bicyclo[3.1.1]heptane

Identifiers
CAS Number	(α): 17699-05-7; (α-trans): 13474-59-4; (α-cis): 23971-87-1; (β): 6895-56-3; (β-trans): 15438-94-5; (β-cis): 15438-93-4
3D model (JSmol)	(α): Interactive image; (β) (β): Interactive image; (β-cis): Interactive image
ChEBI	(α-trans): CHEBI:62756; (α-cis): CHEBI:61679; (β-cis): CHEBI:61678
ChemSpider	(α-trans): 78115
KEGG	(α-trans): C20811; (α-cis): C19735; (β-cis): C19737
PubChem CID	(α-trans): 6429302; (α-cis): 6429303; (β-trans): 12300073; (β-cis): 12300069
UNII	(α-trans): 599TK2712C (α-trans); (β): 2H330CKD1Z
CompTox Dashboard (EPA)	(α-trans): DTXSID901017570
- InChI: (α-trans): InChI=1S/C15H24/c1-11(2)6-5-9-15(4)13-8-7-12(3)14(15)10-13/h6-7,13-14H,5,8-10H2,1-4H3/t13-,14-,15+/m0/s1 Key: YMBFCQPIMVLNIU-SOUVJXGZSA-N; (α-cis): InChI=1S/C15H24/c1-11(2)6-5-9-15(4)13-8-7-12(3)14(15)10-13/h6-7,13-14H,5,8-10H2,1-4H3/t13-,14-,15-/m0/s1 Key: YMBFCQPIMVLNIU-KKUMJFAQSA-N; (β-trans): InChI=1S/C15H24/c1-11(2)6-5-9-15(4)13-8-7-12(3)14(15)10-13/h6,13-14H,3,5,7-10H2,1-2,4H3/t13-,14-,15-/m0/s1 Key: DGZBGCMPRYFWFF-KKUMJFAQSA-N; (β-cis): InChI=1S/C15H24/c1-11(2)6-5-9-15(4)13-8-7-12(3)14(15)10-13/h6,13-14H,3,5,7-10H2,1-2,4H3/t13-,14-,15+/m0/s1 Key: DGZBGCMPRYFWFF-SOUVJXGZSA-N
- SMILES: (α): CC1=CCC2CC1C2(C)CCC=C(C)C; (β) (β): CC(=CCCC1(C2CCC(=C)C1C2)C)C; (β-cis): CC(=CCC[C@@]1([C@H]2CCC(=C)[C@@H]1C2)C)C

Properties
Chemical formula	C_{15}H_{24}
Molar mass	204.357 g·mol^{−1}
- Except where otherwise noted, data are given for materials in their standard state (at 25 °C [77 °F], 100 kPa). Infobox references

Bergamotenes are a group of isomeric chemical compounds with the molecular formula C_{15}H_{24}. The bergamotenes are found in a variety of plants, particularly in their essential oils.

There are two structural isomers, α-bergamotene and β-bergamotene, which differ only by the location of a double bond. Both of these isomers have stereoisomers, the most common of which are known as the cis and trans-isomers (or endo- and exo-isomers).

α-Bergamotene is found in the oils of carrot, bergamot, lime, citron, cottonseed, and kumquat.

== Pheromones ==
The bergamotenes are pheromones for some insects. For example, β-trans-bergamotene is a pheromone for the wasp Melittobia digitata. Plants can defend themselves against attack by herbivorous insects by producing pheromones such as bergamotenes that attract predators of those herbivores. In a more complex relationship, the tobacco plant Nicotiana attenuata emits α-trans-bergamotene from its flowers at night to attract the tobacco hawk moth (Manduca sexta) as a pollinator; however, during the day the leaves produce α-trans-bergamotene to lure predatory insects to feed on any larvae and eggs that the pollinator may have produced.

== Biosynthesis ==
All the bergamotenes are biosynthesized from farnesyl pyrophosphate via a variety of enzymes including exo-alpha-bergamotene synthase, (+)-endo-beta-bergamotene synthase, (-)-endo-alpha-bergamotene synthase, and others. Bergamotenes, in turn, are intermediates in the biosynthesis of more complex chemical compounds. For example, β-trans-bergamotene is a precursor in the biosynthesis of fumagillin, ovalicin, and related antibiotics.
