= (+)-alpha-santalene synthase ((2Z,6Z)-farnesyl diphosphate cyclizing) =

Class of enzymes

(+)-α-santalene synthase ((2Z,6Z)-farnesyl diphosphate cyclizing)

Identifiers
- EC no.: 4.2.3.50

Databases
- IntEnz: IntEnz view
- BRENDA: BRENDA entry
- ExPASy: NiceZyme view
- KEGG: KEGG entry
- MetaCyc: metabolic pathway
- PRIAM: profile
- PDB structures: RCSB PDB PDBe PDBsum
Search
- PMC: articles
- PubMed: articles
- NCBI: proteins

(+)-α-Santalene synthase ((2Z,6Z)-farnesyl diphosphate cyclizing) (EC 4.2.3.50, SBS) is an enzyme with systematic name (2Z,6Z)-farnesyl diphosphate lyase (cyclizing; (+)-α-santalene-forming). This enzyme catalyses the following chemical reaction

(2Z,6Z)-farnesyl diphosphate $\rightleftharpoons$ (+)-α-santalene + diphosphate

The enzyme synthesizes a mixture of sesquiterpenoids from (2Z,6Z)-farnesyl diphosphate.
