= List of food origins =

This is a list of food items by the region of the world they originate or were domesticated in.

== Items common to most regions ==
=== Vegetables ===
- Dandelion greens

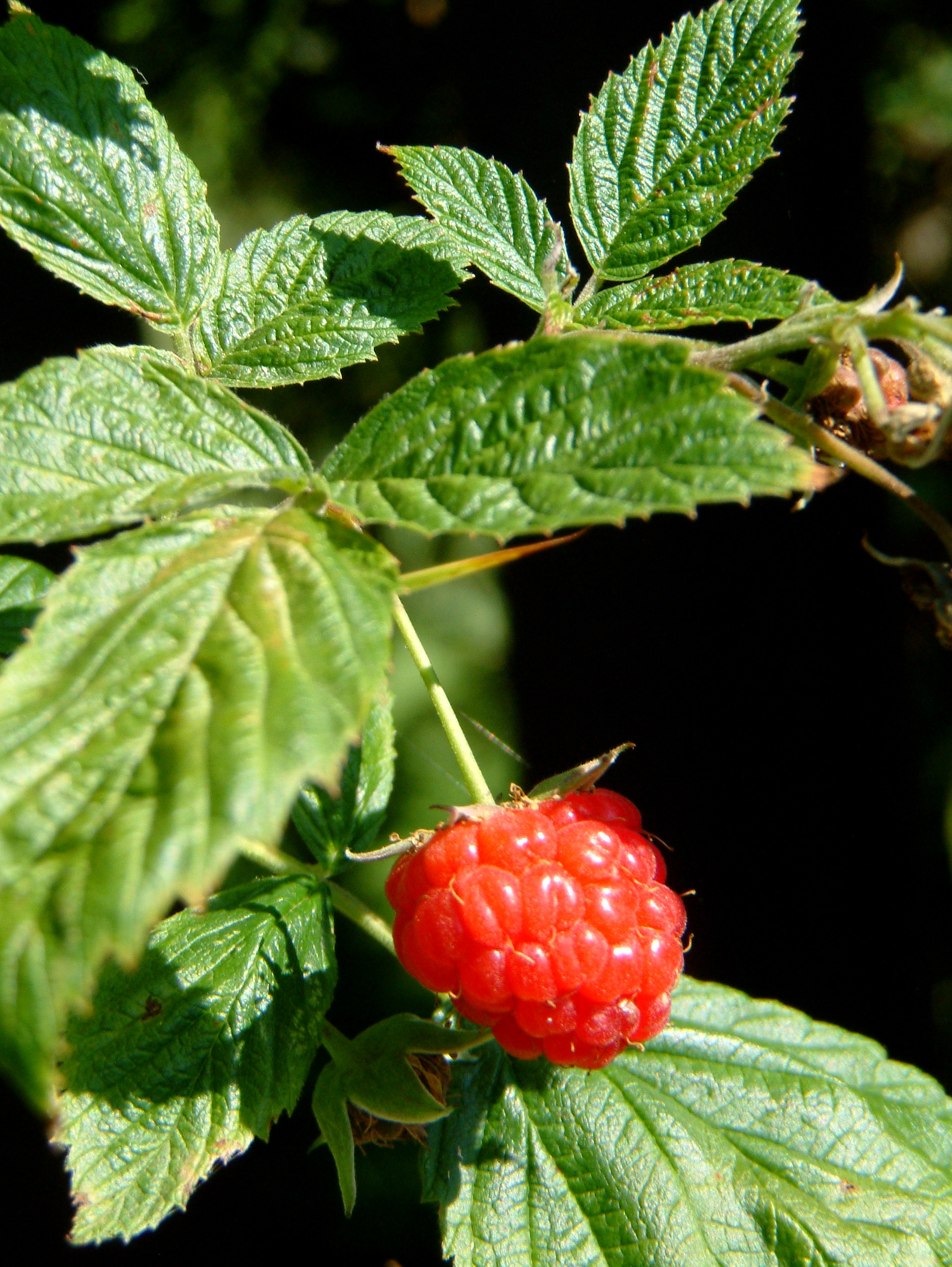
A wild raspberry

=== Fruits ===
- Coconuts
- Cranberry (species are native to subarctic regions)
- Elderberry (not present in tropical regions)
- Mulberry
- Raspberry (not present in Africa)
- Wild strawberry (not present in Africa)
- Yellow plum (common to tropical regions, excluding North America, Europe, and West Asia)

=== Meats ===
- Crab
- Mussels
- Rabbit
- Duck

=== Seeds/Nuts ===
- Acorn (not present in Africa and South America)
- Chestnuts (Northern Hemisphere)
- Hickory nuts (species native to East/Southeast Asia, North America, and South Asia)
- Pine nuts
- Walnuts (Northern Hemisphere)

=== Herbs/Spices ===
- Wormwood

=== Other ===
- Birch syrup (produced from birch trees which are native to Europe, North Asia, and North America)

== East Africa ==
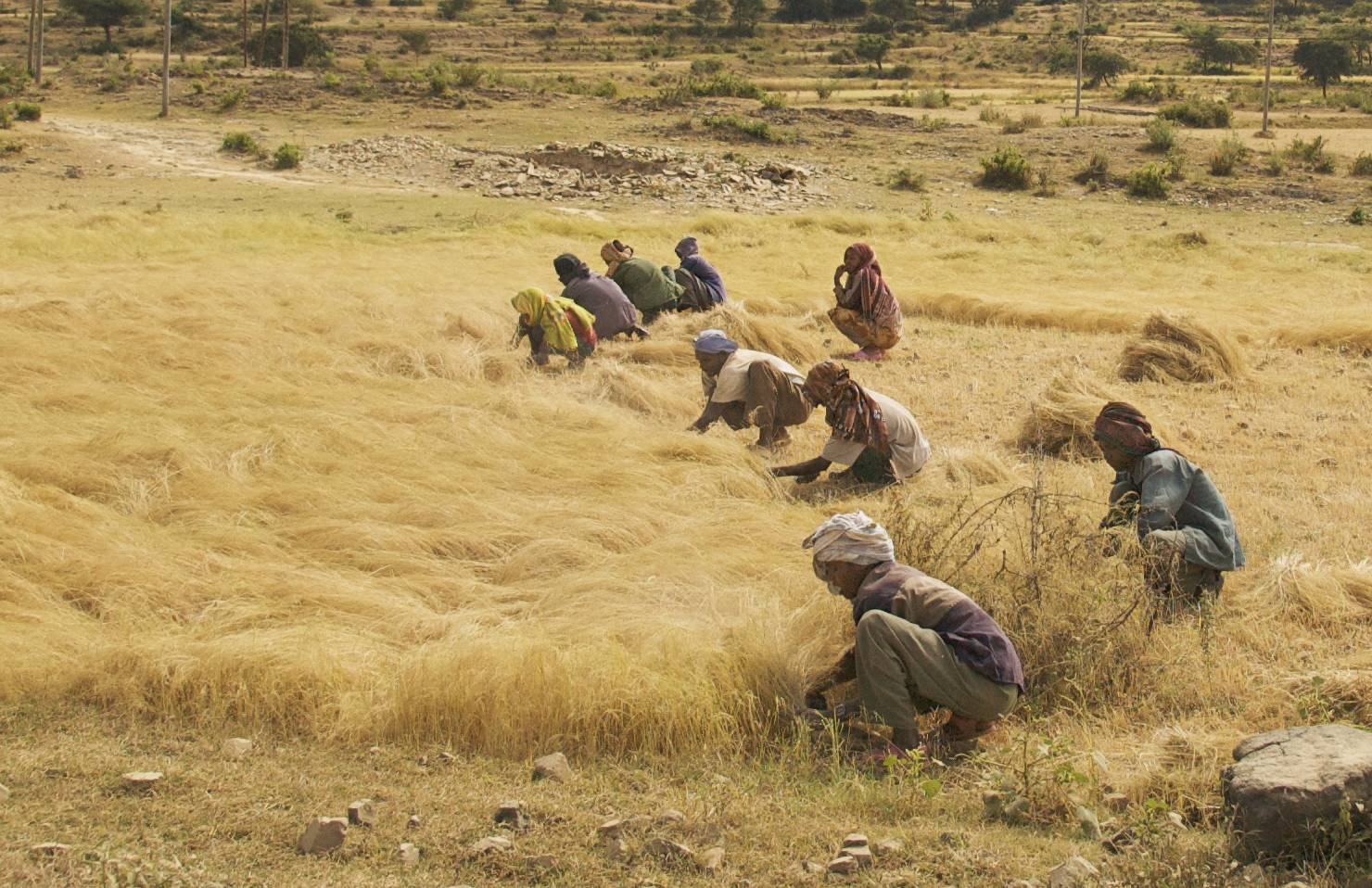
Workers harvesting teff in Northern Ethiopia

=== Grains/Cereals ===
- Finger millet
- Teff
- Sorghum Originally from Sudan

=== Vegetables ===
- Ensete
- Okra

=== Fruits ===
- Watermelon, originally from Northern Sudan.
- African gooseberry
- Water berry
- Monkey apple
- Star gooseberry
- Voa vanga

=== Seeds/Nuts ===
- Noug
- Yeheb

=== Other ===
- Coffee
- Khat

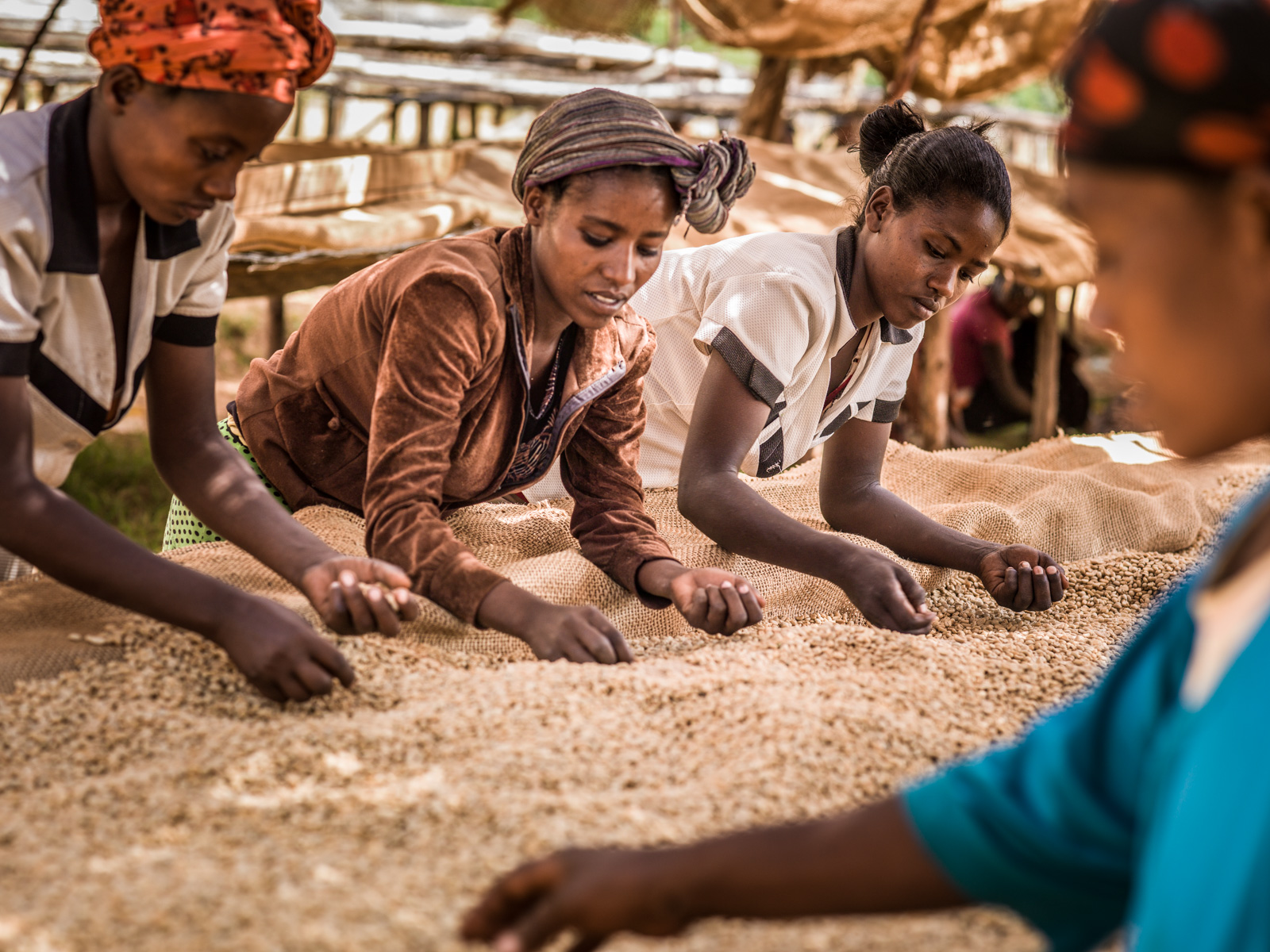
Four workers sorting coffee beans for size in Hawassa, Ethiopia

== West and Southern Africa ==
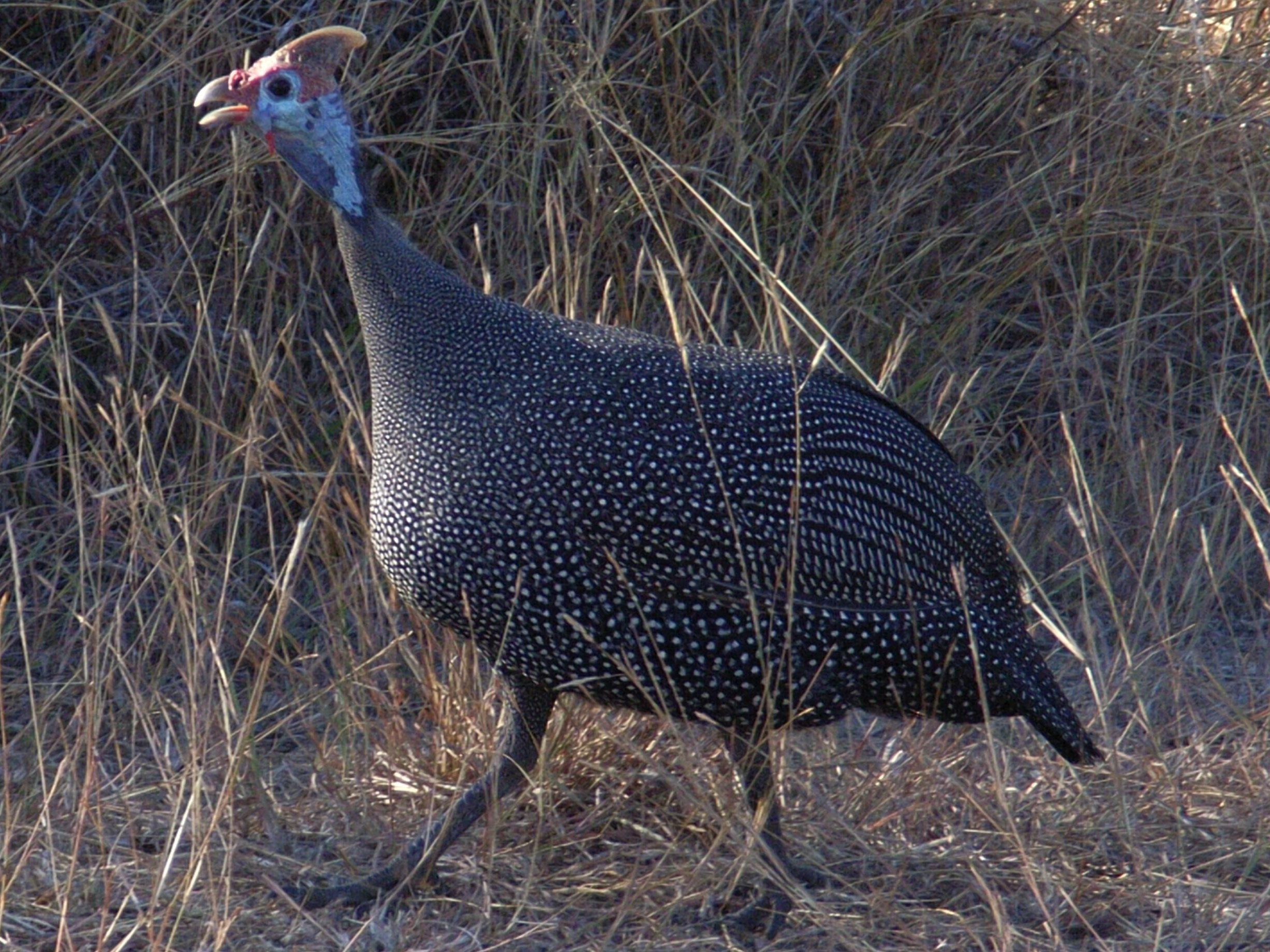
Guineafowl in Kruger Park, South Africa

=== Grains/Cereals ===
- African rice
- Fonio
- Pearl millet

=== Vegetables ===
- Cowpea or black-eye peas
- Hausa groundnut
- Pigeon pea
- Yam

=== Fruits ===
- Ackee
- African custard-apple
- African mangosteen
- African peach
- Amvout
- Baobab fruit
- Bungo
- Boufembe
- Bushveld
- Udara
- Black monkey orange
- Fluted gourd
- Finger root
- Kaffir plum
- Kola nut
- Cola millenii
- Bush cola (Cola pachycarpa)
- Monkey cola (Cola rostrata and Cola lepidota)
- Liane
- Marula
- Miracle berry
- Mokotra
- Natal plum
- Abam (Gambeya lacourtiana)
- Kiwano
- Kei apple
- Mobola plum
- Safou
- Tamarind
- Sao Tome peach (Chytranthus mannii)

=== Meats ===
- Guineafowl

=== Seeds/Nuts ===
- Kola Nut

=== Other ===
- Oil palm
- Ossame

== Asia ==
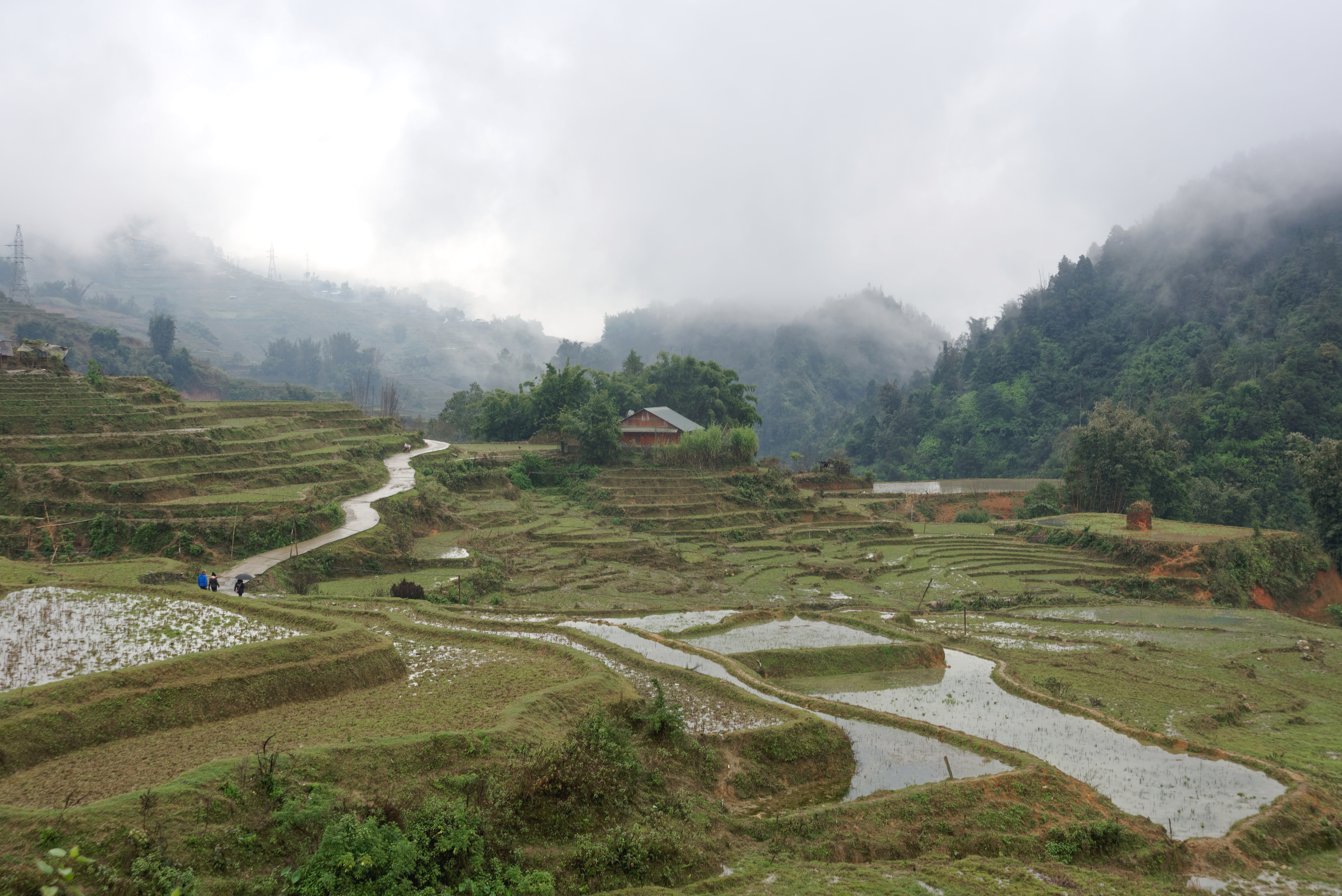
A Vietnamese rice field

== East and Southeast Asia ==
=== Grains/Cereals ===
- Buckwheat
- Foxtail millet
- Rice

=== Vegetables ===
- Adzuki bean (or red mung bean)
- Calabash (or bottle gourd)
- Ginseng
- Lolot
- Katuk
- Radish
- Soybean
- Taro
- Water spinach
- Wax gourd
- Winged bean

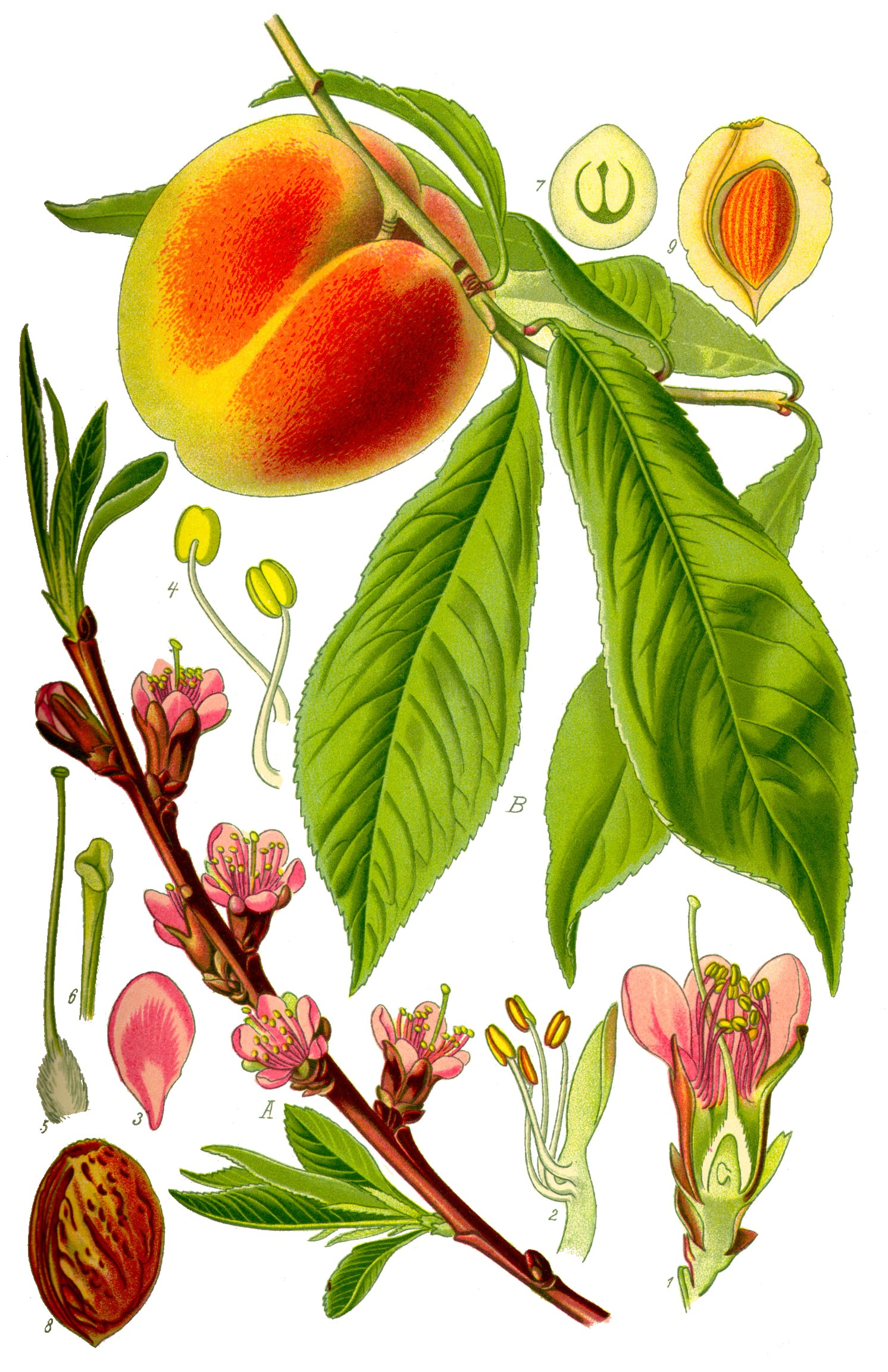
An illustration of a peach in different stages

=== Fruits ===
- Akebi
- Autumnberry
- Assam fan palm (Livistona jenkinsiana)
- Asam paya
- Asam keping
- Alupag
- Asian pear
- Batoko plum
- Burmese grape (Baccaurea ramiflora)
- Bangkal
- Boxthorn
- Bilimbi
- Button mangosteen
- Seashore mangosteen
- Yellow mangosteen
- Che
- Citrus fruits (Citron, Calamansi, Grapefruit, Kumquat, Mandarin, Lemon, Lime, Orange, Pomelo, and Tangerine)
- Cempedak
- Ceri
- Palmyra Palm
- Durian
- Durian Kuning
- Red durian
- Red-fleshed durian
- Dabai
- Gac
- Goji
- Goumi
- Hardy Kiwi
- Jambos
- Katmon
- Kousa dogwood
- Kadsura coccinea
- Kepel
- Kuy
- Kiwifruit
- Kubal
- Kwai muk
- Lanzones
- Lapsi
- Longan
- Loquat
- Lipote
- Lychee
- Luuk jan
- Mangosteen
- Matoa
- Breadfruit
- Keledang
- Marang
- Maprang
- Malay gooseberry
- Mock Strawberry
- Melinjo
- Peach
- Persimmon
- Pomelo
- Paper mulberry
- Pangium
- Pulasan
- Pedalai
- Rambutan
- Rambai
- Rattan
- Rukam
- Rose myrtle
- Salak
- Starfruit
- Scramberry
- Sugar palm
- Spiderberry
- Sawo kecik
- Tampoi
- Japanese barberry
- Jentik
- Monkfruit
- Ucong
- Yangmei
- Wampi
- Wax apple
- Velvet tamarind
- Velvet persimon
- White mango
- Gitaan
- Nam nam
- Uvaria grandiflora
- Red sapote (Timonius minahassae)

=== Meats ===
- Chicken

=== Seeds/Nuts ===
- Fox nut
- Malva nut
- Water caltrop

=== Herbs/Spices ===
- Betel leaf
- Fingerroot
- Fish mint
- Indonesian bay leaf
- Hot mint
- Kewra
- Saffrol laurel
- Sichuan pepper

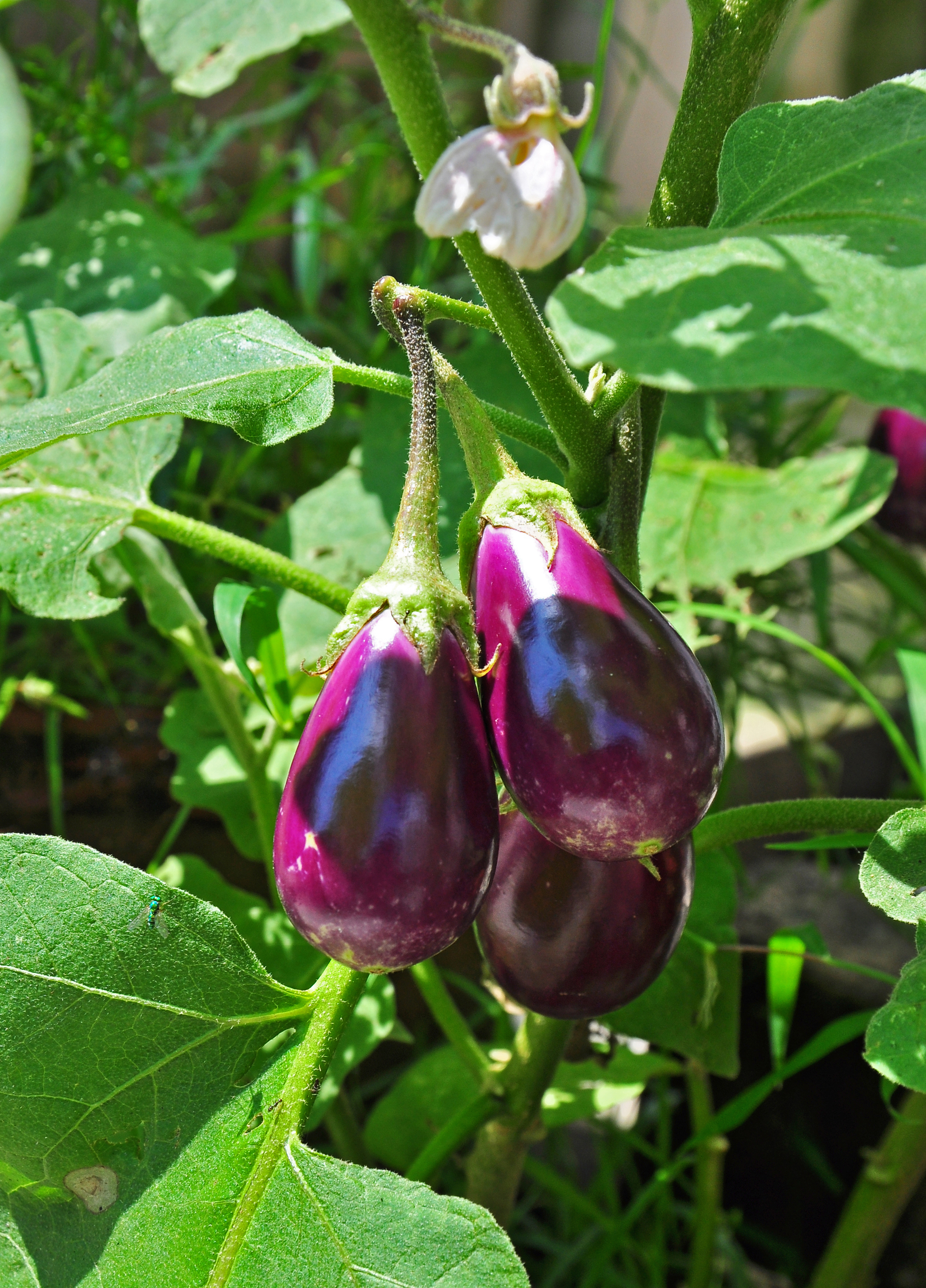
Eggplants that are yet to be harvested

=== Other ===
- Tea
- Hemp
- Java olive tree

== Southern Asia or Indian Subcontinent ==
=== Grains/Cereals ===
- Indian barnyard millet
- Jungle Rice
- Little Millet
- Raishan

=== Vegetables ===
- Black gram
- Chamoe
- Cucumber
- Eggplant
- Elephant foot yam
- Horseradish tree
- Ivy gourd
- Luffa
- Angled luffa
- Moth Bean
- Mung Bean
- Neem
- Pigeon pea
- Snake gourd
- Ceylon spinach

=== Fruits ===
- Akola
- Bael fruit
- Bengal Currant
- Burflower-tree
- Ceylon gooseberry
- Ceylon raspberry
- Brindle berry
- Cowa fruit
- Elephant apple
- Jackfruit
- Indian gooseberry
- Indian coffee plum
- Indian plum
- Gamboge
- Glueberry
- Gajale
- Kon Thekera
- Kadamba
- Malabar plum
- Medlar
- Mahura
- Mango
- Monkey fruit
- Mootippuli
- Soh-shang
- Taikor
- Tara
- Wood-apple

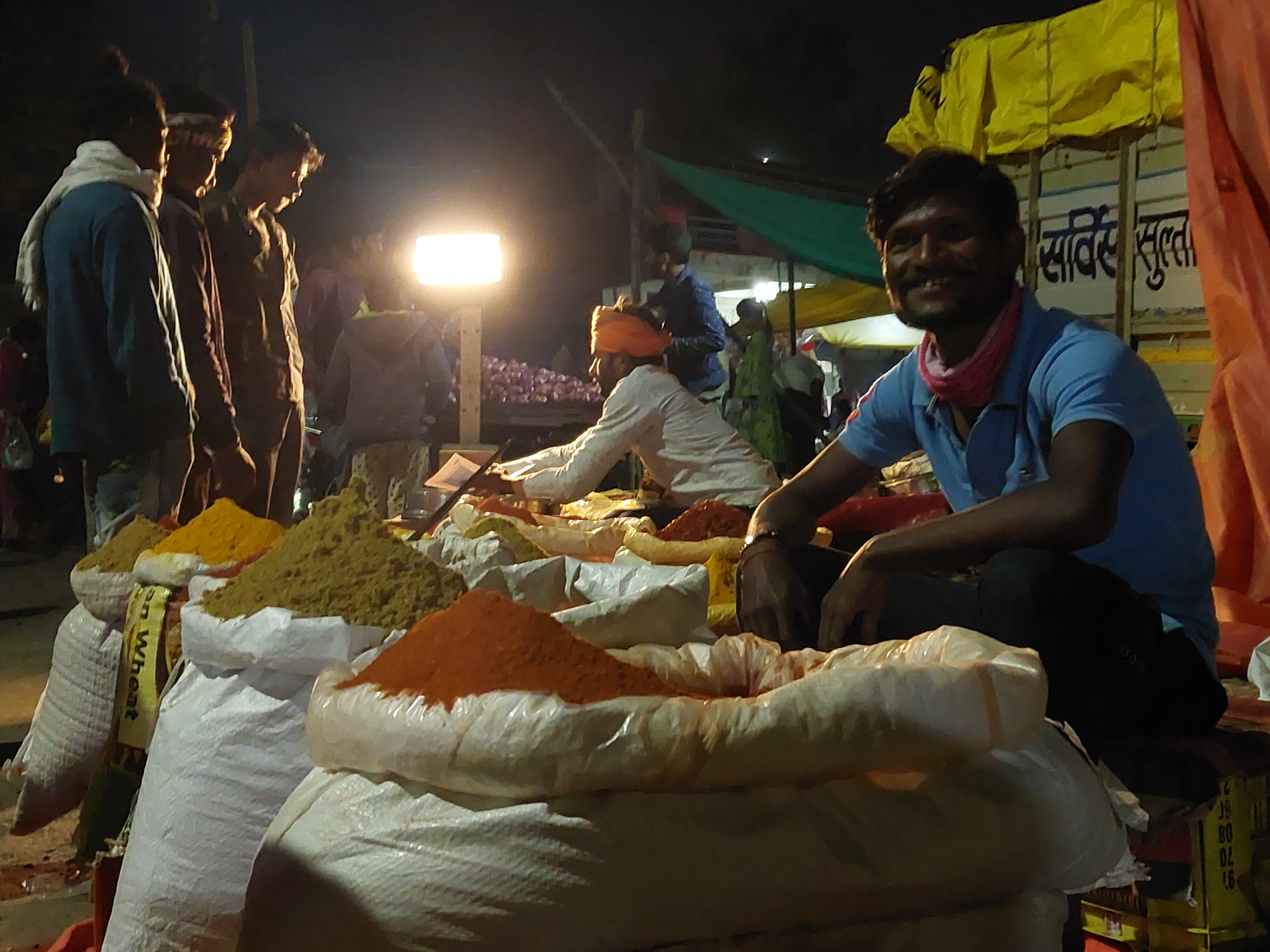
Indian spice market

=== Herbs/Spices ===
- Black pepper
- Cardamom
- Cinnamon
- Curry leaf
- Holy basil
- Indian bay leaf
- Long pepper
- Radhuni
- Turmeric
- Vetiver

=== Other ===
- Sal tree

== Western Asia or Middle East ==
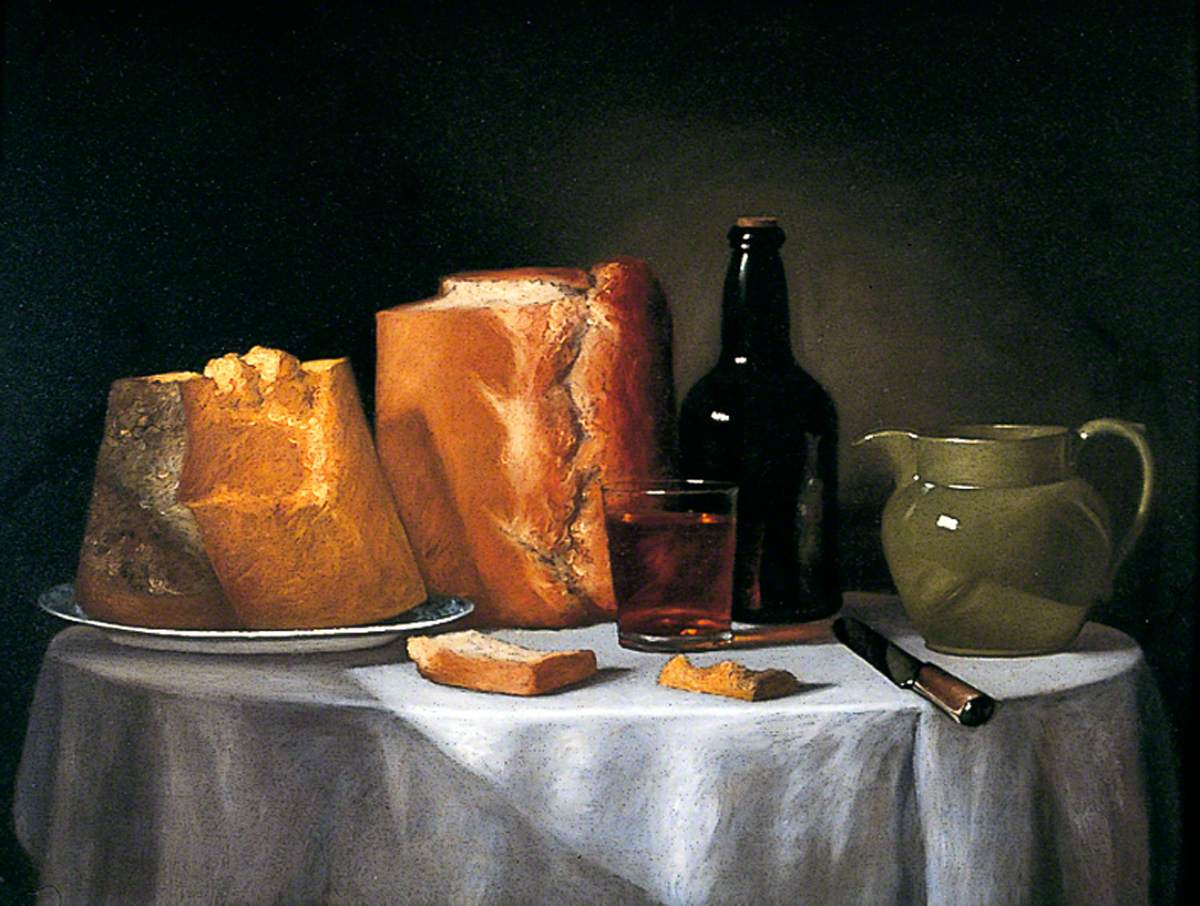
A still life of bread and wine; products of wheat and grapes which were originally cultivated in Western Asia

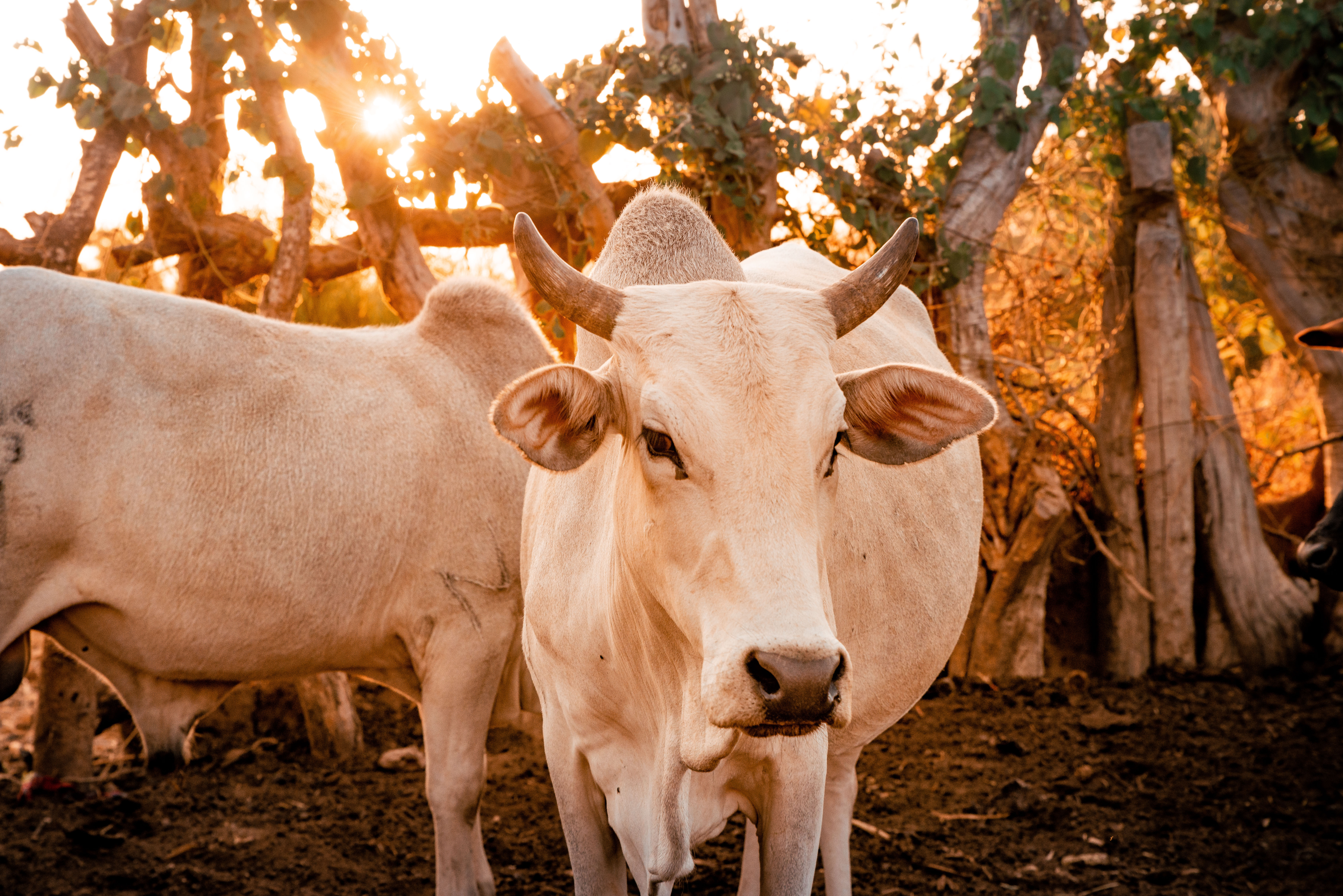
Cattle

=== Grains/Cereals ===
- Barley
- Bitter vetch
- Oats
- Rye
- Wheat

=== Vegetables ===
- Allium species (chives, garlic, leek, onion, scallions, and shallots)
- Asparagus
- Beet
- Carrot
- Chickpea
- Fava bean
- Lentil
- Lettuce
- Turnip

=== Fruits ===
- Apple
- Apricot
- Date palm
- Fig
- Grape
- Jujube
- Lasura
- Myrtus
- Plum
- Medlar
- Pomegranate
- Quince

=== Meats ===
- Beef
- Goat
- Mutton
- Pork

=== Seeds/Nuts ===
- Almond
- Flax or Linseed
- Sesame

=== Herbs/Spices ===
- Asafoetida
- Black caraway
- Coriander
- Dill
- Lemongrass
- Thyme
- Mustard
- Spearmint

== Australia ==
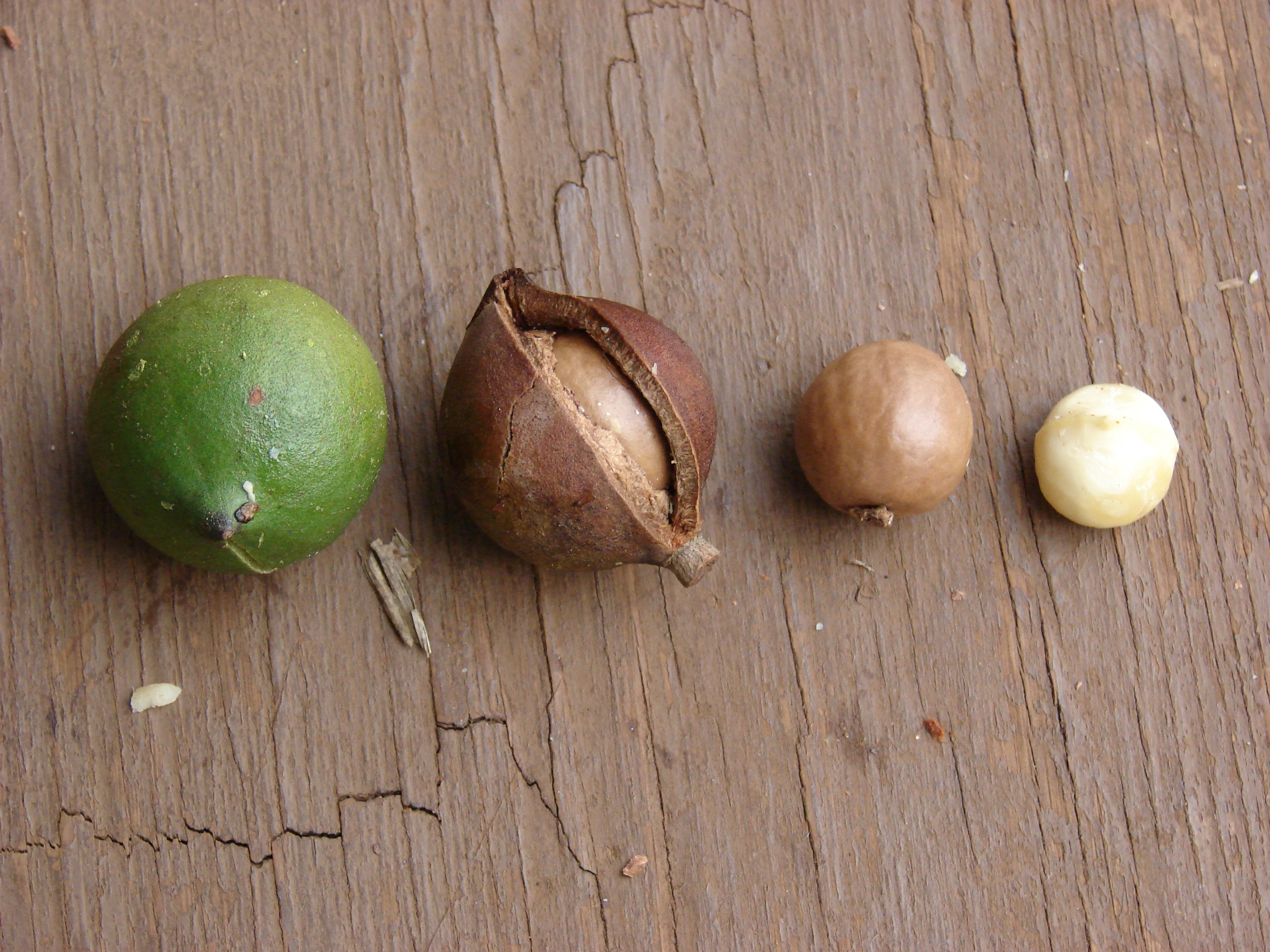
Various stages of the Macadamia nut

=== Vegetables ===
- Pencil yam

=== Fruits ===
- Australian tamarind
- Black apple
- Blue cherry
- Broad-leaf bramble
- Burdekin plum
- Bush cherry
- Bush banana
- Cedar Bay cherry
- Cluster fig
- Common apple-berry
- Conkerberry
- Davidson's plum
- Desert fig
- Desert lime
- Emu apple
- Fibrous satinash
- Finger lime
- Illawarra plum
- Kakadu lime
- Kakadu plum
- Karkalla
- Lady apple
- Lemon aspen
- Little gooseberry tree
- Lilly pilly
- Magenta cherry
- Midyim
- Mountain pepper
- Muntries
- Native cherry
- Native currant
- Nonda plum
- Pigface
- Purple apple-berry
- Purple cherry
- Quandong
- Riberry
- Sandpaper fig
- Snow berry
- Sweet apple-berry
- Southern satinash
- White aspen
- White apple
- Powderpuff lilly-pilly
- Wild orange

=== Seeds/Nuts ===
- Macadamia

=== Meats ===
- Emu
- Kangaroo
- Possum
- Sea turtle

=== Other ===
- Aniseed myrtle
- Saltbush
- Witchetty grub

== Austranesia and New Guinea ==
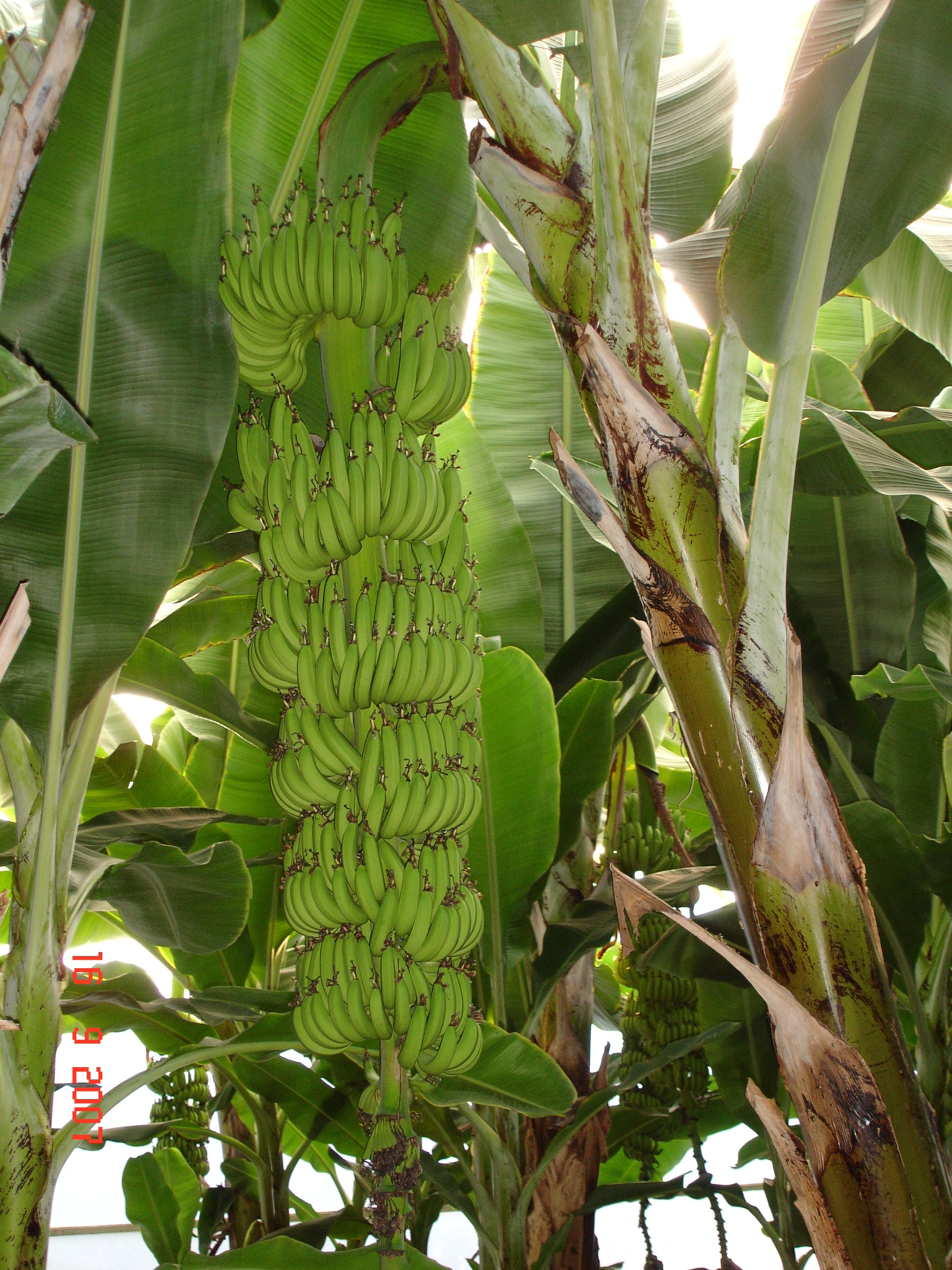
Banana tree featuring a full crop

=== Grains/Cereals ===
- Job's tears

=== Vegetables ===
- Aibika
- Air yam
- East Asian arrowroot (Kudzu)
- Eucheuma (sea moss or gusô)
- Fiji sago palm
- Fiveleaf yam
- Giant swamp taro
- Giant taro
- Highland pitpit
- Indian coral tree
- Joint fir
- Lengkuas
- Lesser yam
- Pako
- The Plentiful fig
- Polynesian arrowroot
- Sea grape
- Ti plant
- Torch ginger
- Ube (purple yam)
- Water chestnut

=== Fruits ===
- Antidesma montanum
- Banana
- Bignay
- Bilimbi
- Binukaw
- Blue tongue
- Breadfruit
- Button mangosteen
- Breadnut
- Cempedak
- Dracontomelon costatum
- Dragon plum
- Fingersop
- Fe'i banana
- Dye Fig
- Ficus wassa
- Hala fruit
- Galo
- Golden apple
- Hala Fruit
- Island lychee
- Jackfruit
- Java apple
- Lipote
- Mangosteen
- Nypa fruticans
- Marang
- Marata
- Marianas breadfruit
- Millaa millaa vine
- Monkey jack
- Mo'onia fruit
- Mountain apple
- Noni
- Rambutan
- Rattan fruit
- Rukam
- Santol
- Star fruit
- Tal palm
- Tipuho
- Velvet apple
- Water apple

Sugarcane for sale in a market in Kerala, India

=== Meats ===
- Banteng
- Carabao

=== Seeds/Nuts ===
- Beach cordia
- Galip nut
- Pao nut
- Pili
- Sea almond
- Tahitian chestnut

=== Herbs/Spices ===
- Bitter ginger
- Clove
- Cubeb
- Ginger
- Lemongrass
- Nutmeg tree (origin of Nutmeg and Mace)
- Pangi
- Pandan

=== Other ===
- Agar
- Areca nut
- Areng palm
- Betel
- Edible-nest swiftlet
- Jaggery palm
- Kalingag
- Kava
- Nipa palm
- Queen sago palm
- Sugarcane
- True sago palm

== Northern Europe, Western Europe and Eastern Europe ==
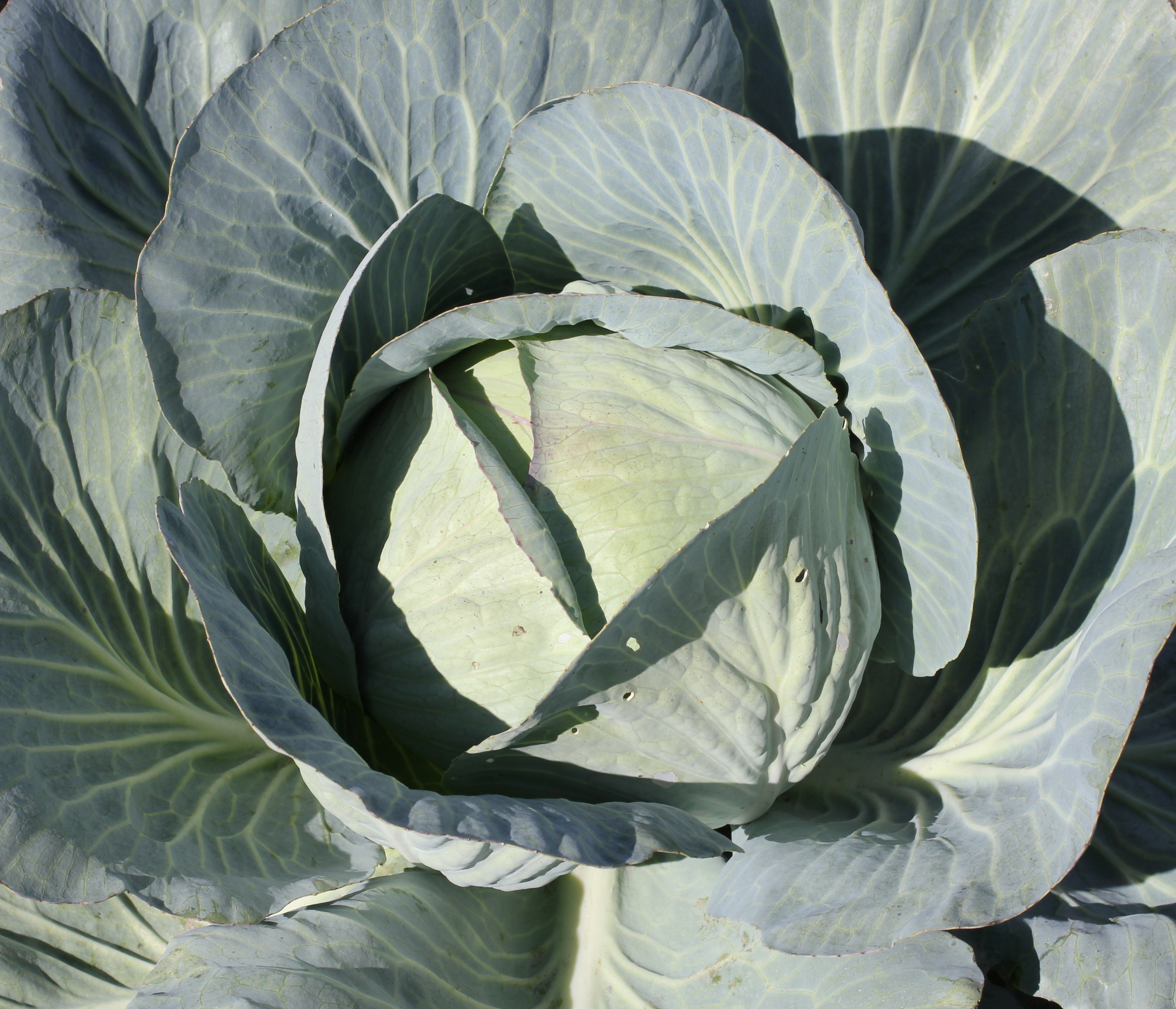
A head of cabbage

=== Grains/Cereals ===
- Large crabgrass

=== Vegetables ===
- Angelica
- Cabbage
- Parsnips
- Kohlrabi

=== Fruits ===
- Arbutus berry
- Barberry
- Blackcurrant
- Briançon apricot
- Bilberry
- Cherry
- Cloudberry
- Date-plum
- Dewberry
- Elderberry
- Garden strawberry (domesticated variety)
- Gooseberry
- Guelder rose
- Hawberry
- Hawthorn
- Lingonberry
- Juniper berry
- Pear
- Plum
- Red raspberry
- Redcurrant
- Rose hip
- Sloe
- Whortleberry

=== Meats ===
- Domestic Rabbit

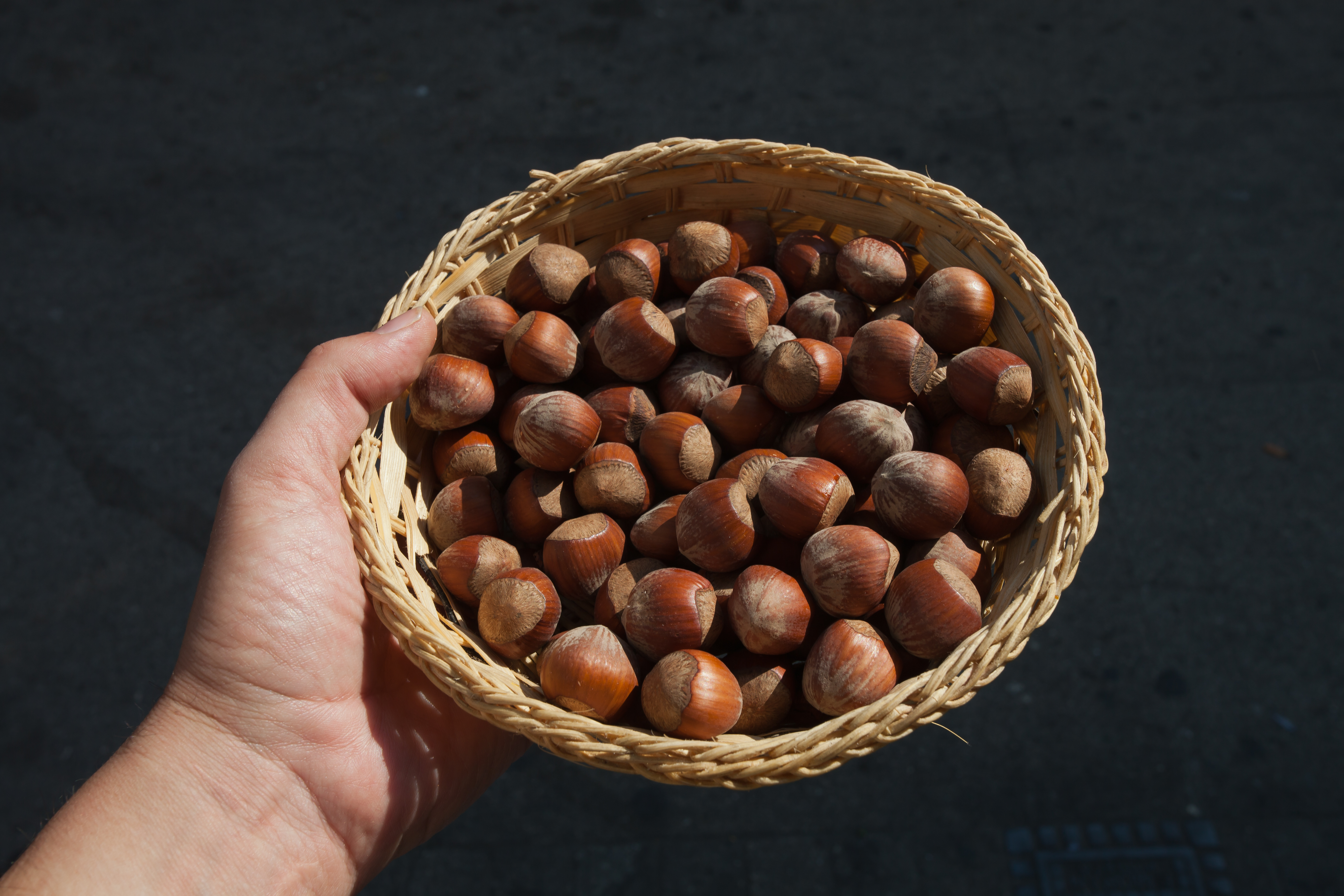
A basket of hazelnuts from Galiza, Spain

=== Seeds/Nuts ===
- Hazelnuts
- Rapeseed

=== Herbs/Spices ===
- Caraway
- Dill
- Hops
- Tarragon

== Southern Europe or Mediterranean ==
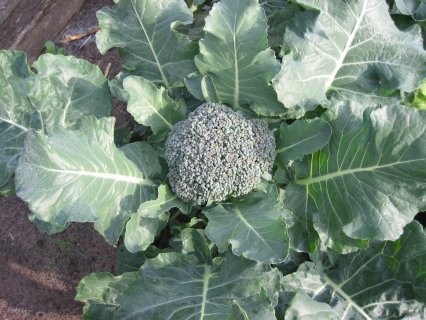
A broccoli plant ready for harvest

=== Vegetables ===
- Broccoli
- Brussels sprouts
- Beetroot
- Caper
- Cauliflower
- Collard
- Kale
- Sugarbeet
- Peas

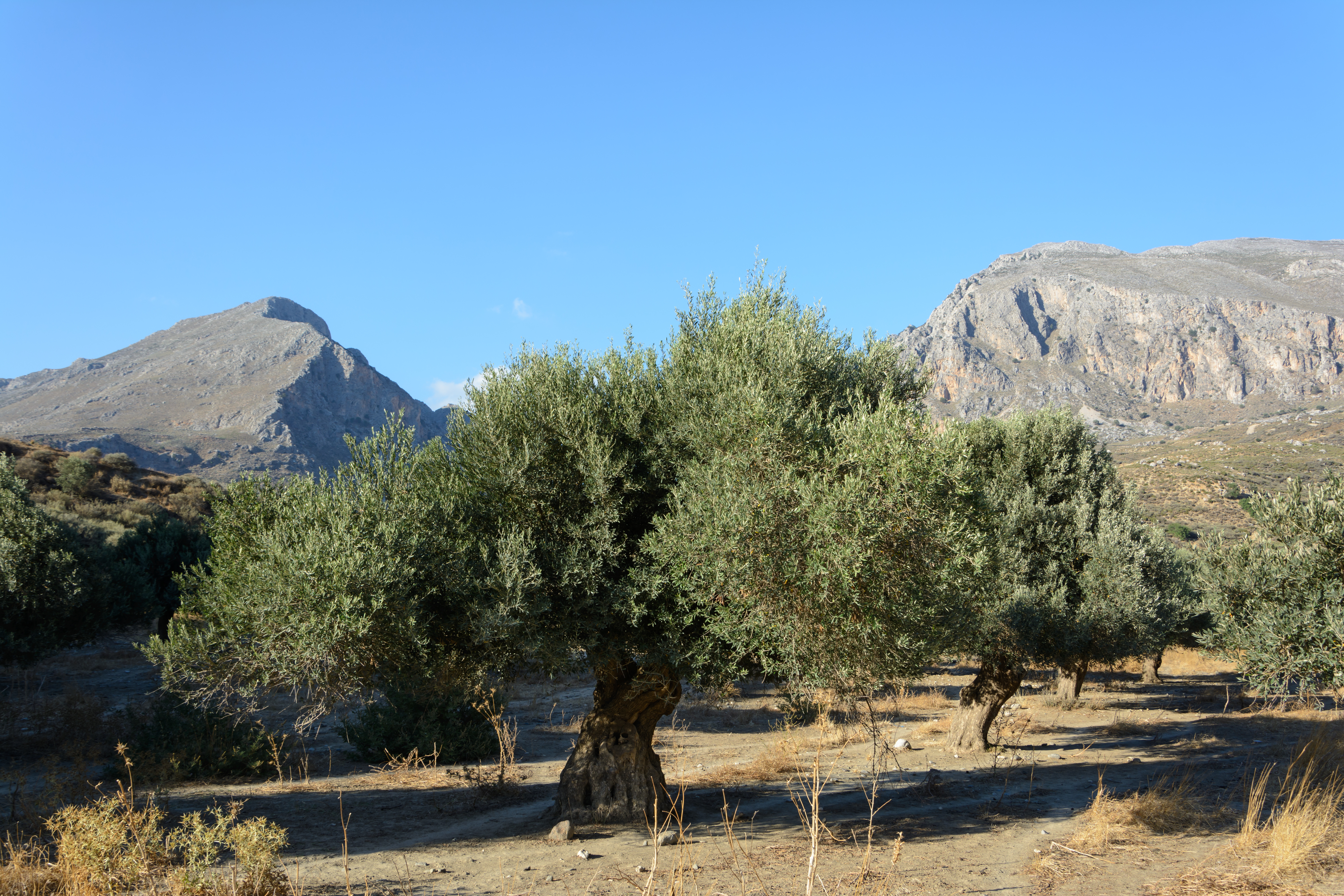
An olive tree in Crete

=== Fruits ===
- Cornelian cherry
- Fig
- Juniper berry
- Grape vine (Vitis vinifera)
- Madrone (Arbutus unedo)
- Seaberry
- Olive

=== Herbs/Spices ===
- Catnip
- Common sage
- Fennel
- Oregano
- Parsley
- Rosemary

== North America ==
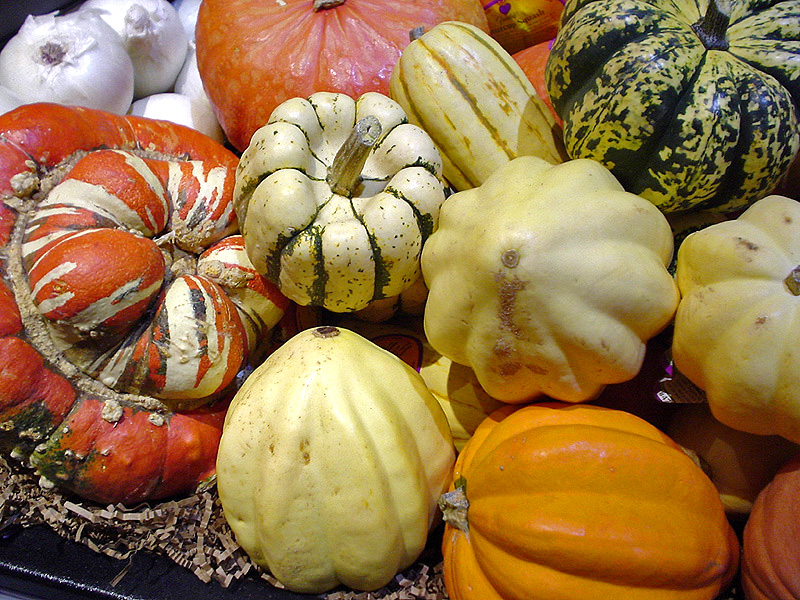
Various squashes such as Turban, Sweet Dumpling, Carnival, Gold Acorn, Delicata, Buttercup and Golden Nugget.

=== Grains/Cereals ===
- Amaranth
- Erect knotweed
- Little barley
- Maygrass
- Wild rice

=== Vegetables ===
- American Groundnut
- Sunchoke
- Tepary bean
- Dandelion

=== Fruits ===
- American persimmon
- American plum
- American raspberry
- Beach plum
- Black cherry
- Black raspberry
- Blackberry
- Blueberry
- Buffaloberry
- Canada plum
- Canadian serviceberry
- Chokecherry
- Desert apricot
- Dewberry
- Eastern may hawthorn
- Fox grape
- Ground plum
- Huckleberry
- Maypop
- Pawpaw
- Red mulberry
- Salal
- Salmonberry
- Saskatoonberry
- Saw palmetto
- Thimbleberry
- Toyon
- Wintergreen

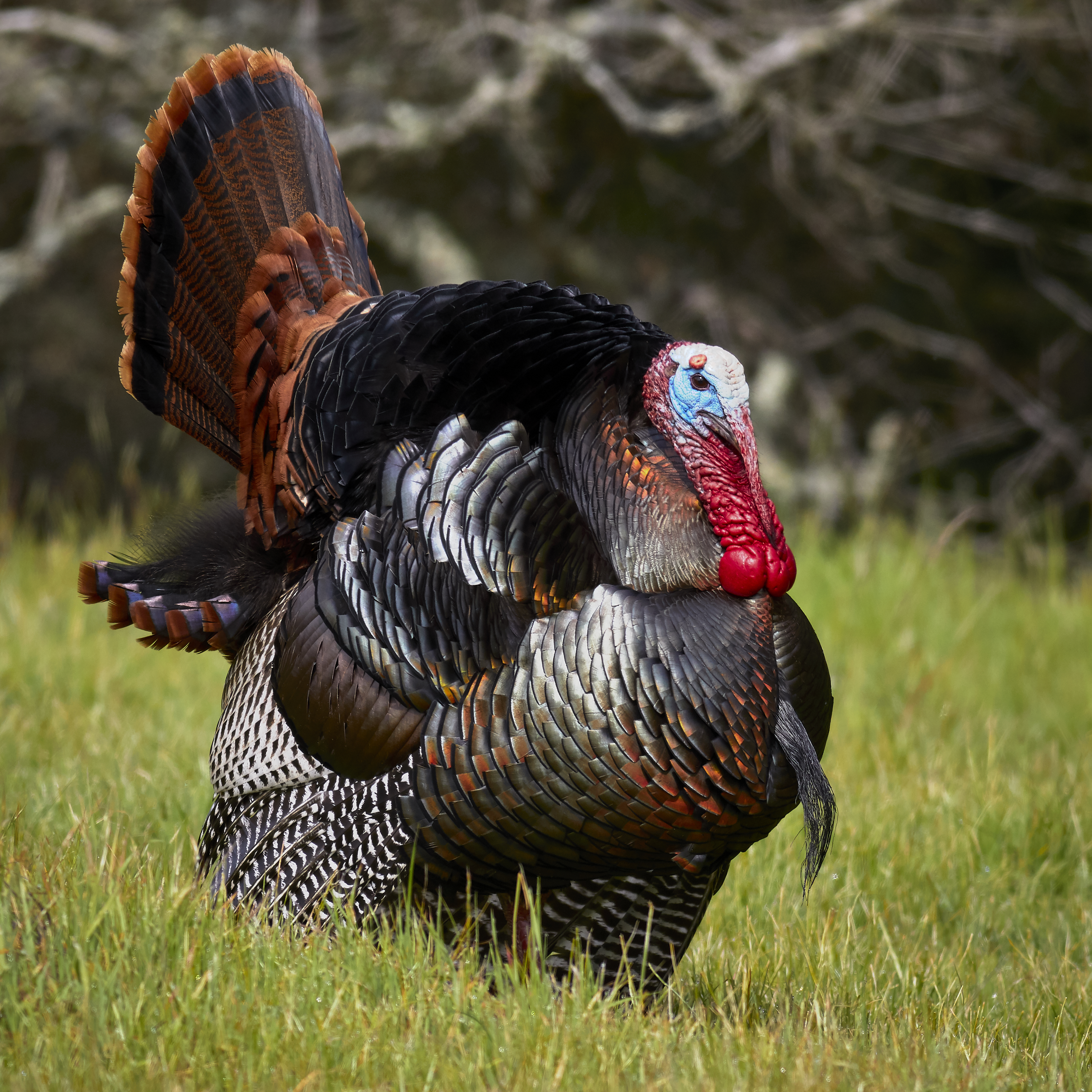
A wild male turkey with plumage on display

=== Meats ===
- Alligator
- Bison
- Turkey (bird)

=== Seeds/Nuts ===
- American hazelnut
- Black Walnut
- Pecan
- Sunflower

=== Herbs/Spices ===
- American ginseng
- Blue sage
- Coneflower
- White sage

=== Other ===
- Maple syrup

== Central America and Caribbean ==
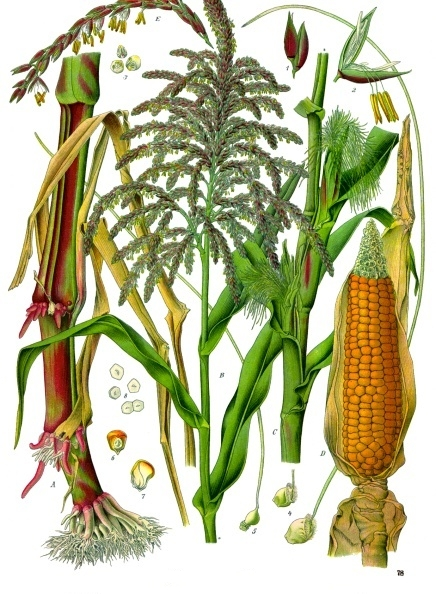
A diagram showing a stalk and cob of Maize/Corn

=== Grains/Cereals ===
- Maize (corn)

=== Vegetables ===
- Common bean or Pole bean
- Jicama
- Prickly pear cactus
- Scarlet runner bean or Butter bean
- Squash species (acorn squash, butternut squash, pumpkin, and zucchini)
- Strangler fig
- Yucca
- Zucchini

=== Fruits ===
- Acerola
- Avocado
- Black sapote
- Guava
- Lucuma
- Mamey sapote
- Muntingia
- Papaya
- Pitaya (Dragonfruit)
- Prickly pear fruit
- Sapodilla
- Soursop
- Tomatillo

=== Herbs/Spices ===
- Achiote
- Allspice
- Blue vine sage
- Chia
- Vanilla

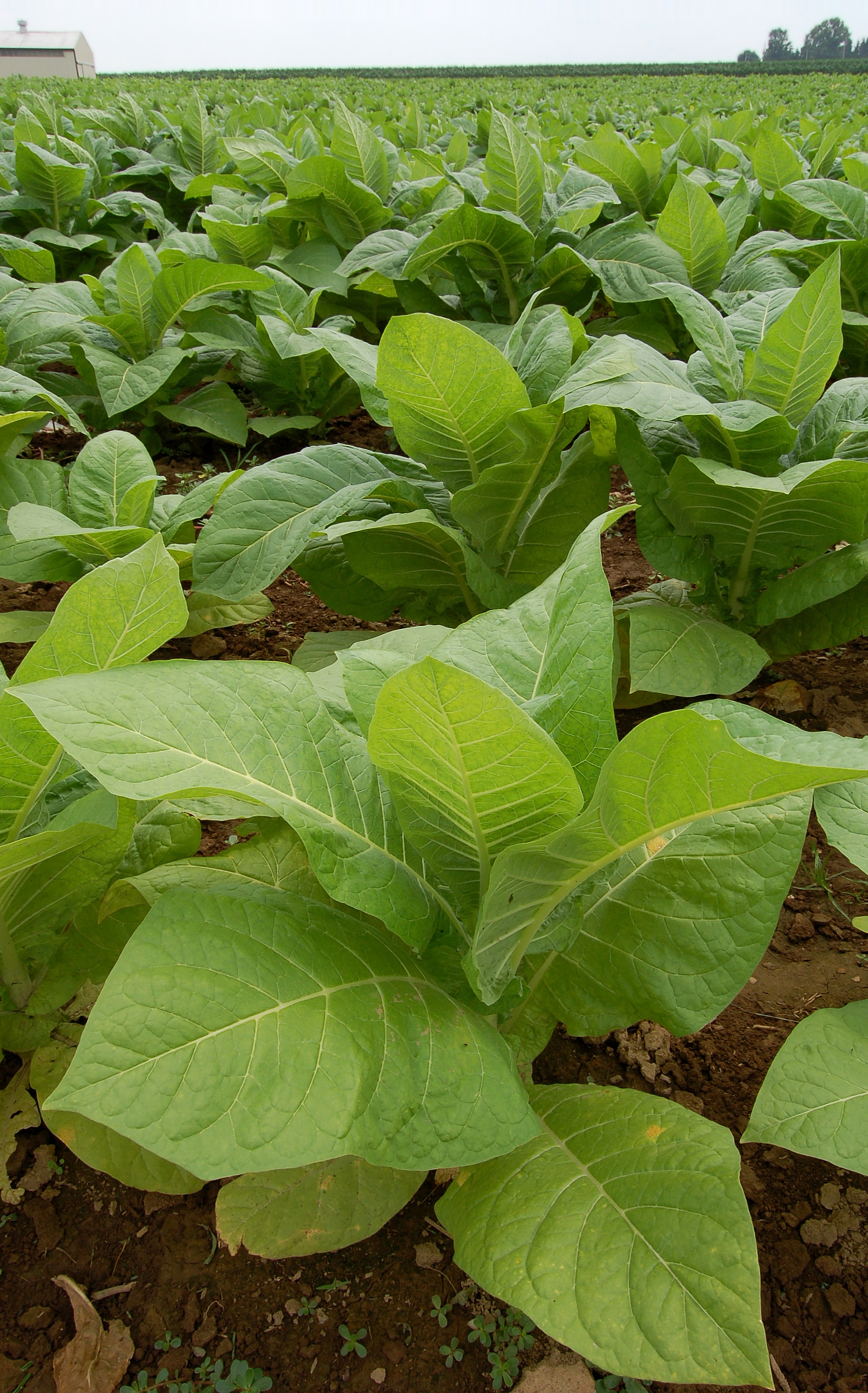
A field of tobacco being grown in Pennsylvania United States

=== Other ===
- Agave
- Chicle
- Diviner's sage
- Tobacco

== South America ==
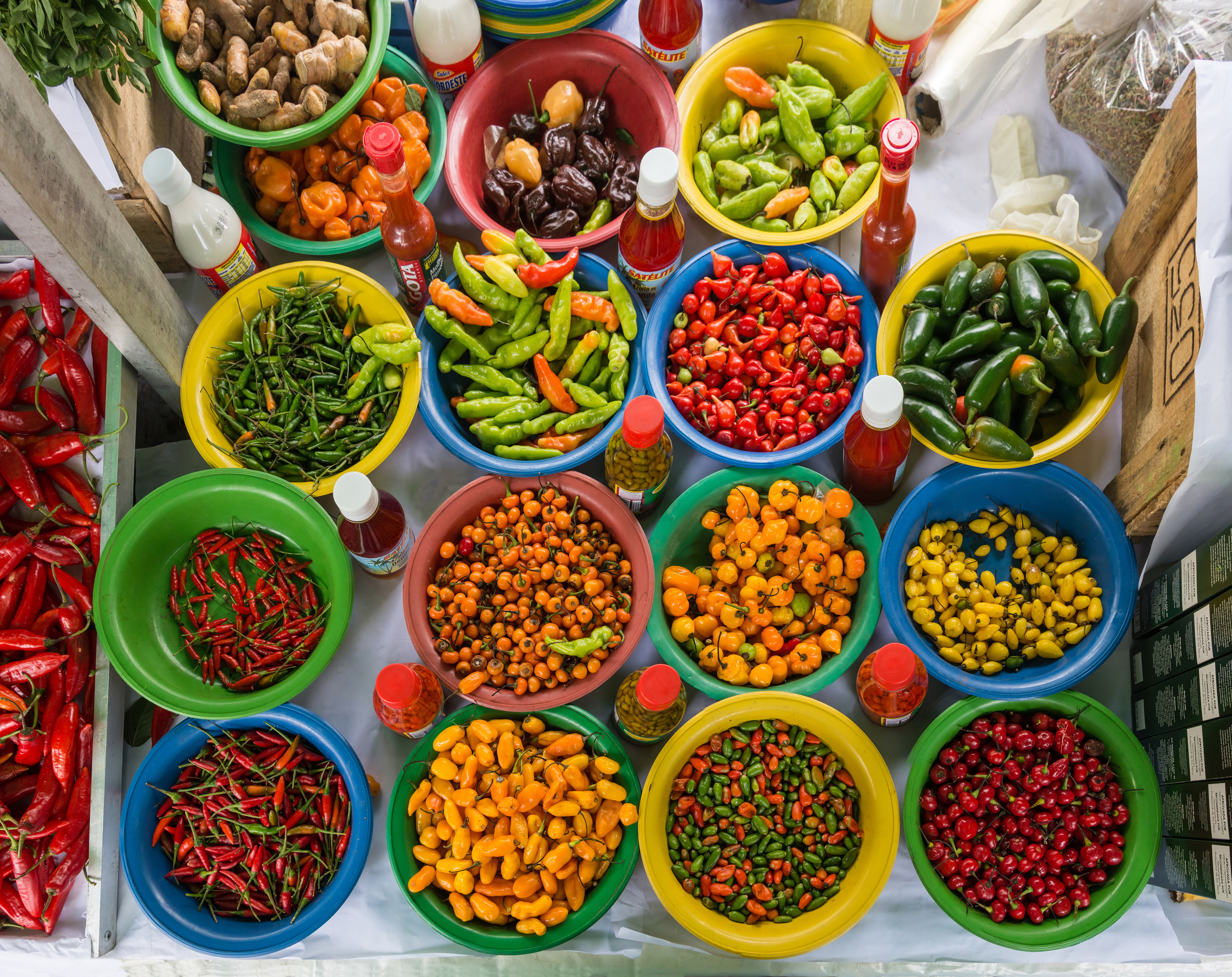
Various chili pepper species presented for sale in a market in São Paulo, Brazil

=== Grains/Cereals ===
- Quinoa

=== Vegetables ===
- Andean lupin
- Arrowroot
- Canna (plant)
- Cassava
- Lima bean
- Oca
- Potatoes
- Sweet potato
- Yacón
- Ulloco

=== Fruits ===
- Araza
- Cashew apple
- Cherimoyas
- Chili peppers
- Courbaril
- Feijoa
- Grenadia
- Jabuticaba
- Jelly palm
- Passion fruit
- Pineapple
- Saúco
- Tamarillo
- Tomato
- Quenepa

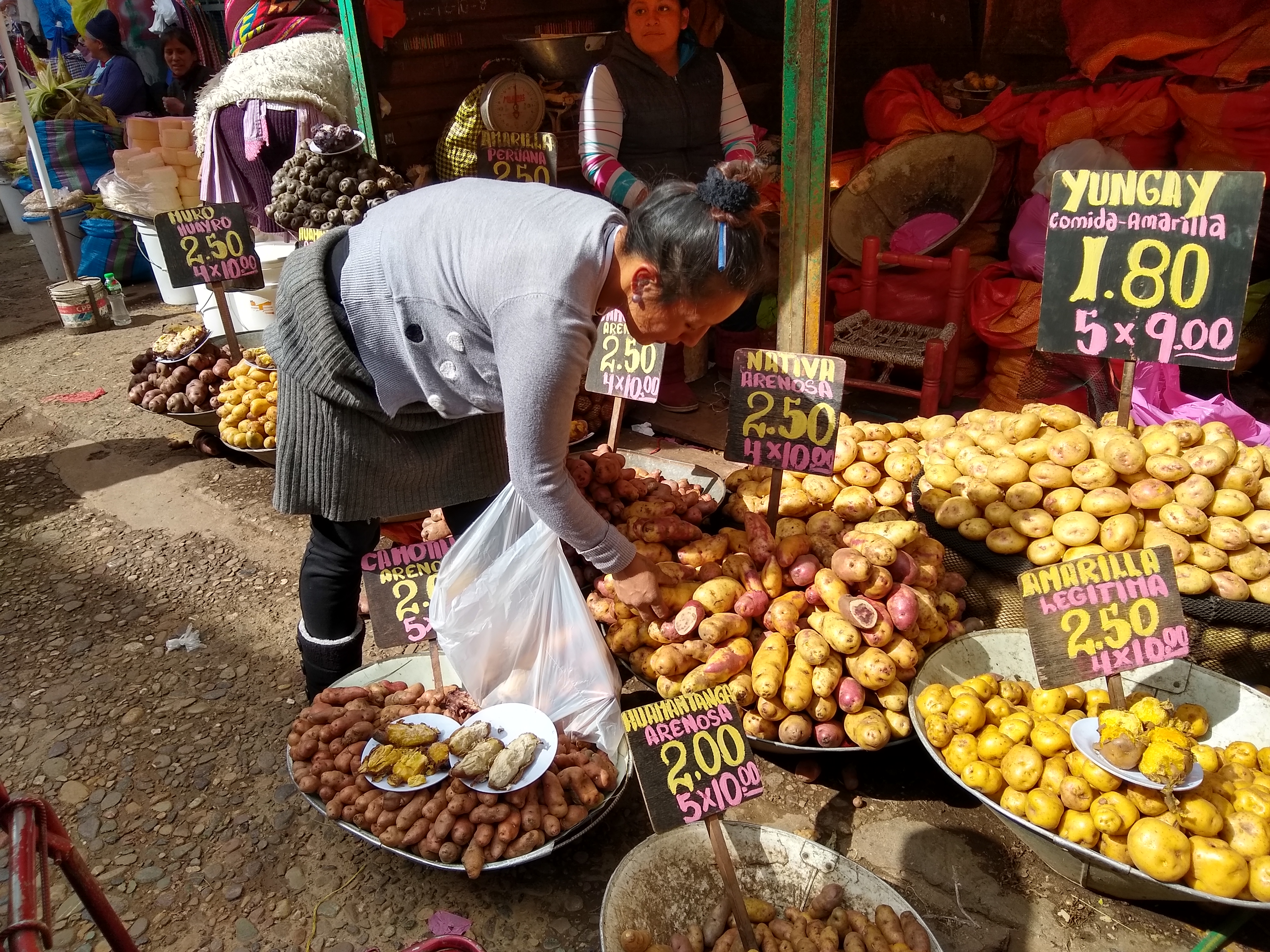
Varieties of potatoes and tubers presented for sale in a market in Huancayo, Peru

=== Meats ===
- Armadillo
- Alpaca
- Capybara
- Guinea pig
- Llama
- Rhea (bird)

=== Seeds/Nuts ===
- Brazil nut
- Cashew
- Peanut

=== Herbs/Spices ===
- Anacahuita
- Boldo
- Cocoa bean
- Lemon verbena

=== Other ===
- Coca
- Guarana
- Guayusa
- Marcela
- Yerba mate

== See also ==
- Ark of Taste – Catalogue of endangered foods
- List of culinary fruits
- List of culinary herbs and spices
- List of culinary nuts
- List of dried foods
- List of edible seeds
- List of snack foods
- List of vegetables
- Local food – Food produced within a short distance of where it is consumed
- Neolithic Revolution – Transition in human history from hunter-gatherer to settled peoples
- New World crops – Crops native to the New World
