= Indian plum =

Indian plum is a common name for several plants and may refer to:

- Oemleria, a shrub in the rose family native to the Pacific Coast of North America
- Flacourtia indica, an Asian species often used as a living fence
- Flacourtia jangomas, a rainforest tree in the willow family that is widely planted in Asia and Southeast Asia
- Flacourtia rukam, an Asian species
- Ziziphus mauritiana, Indian ber or chinese date
