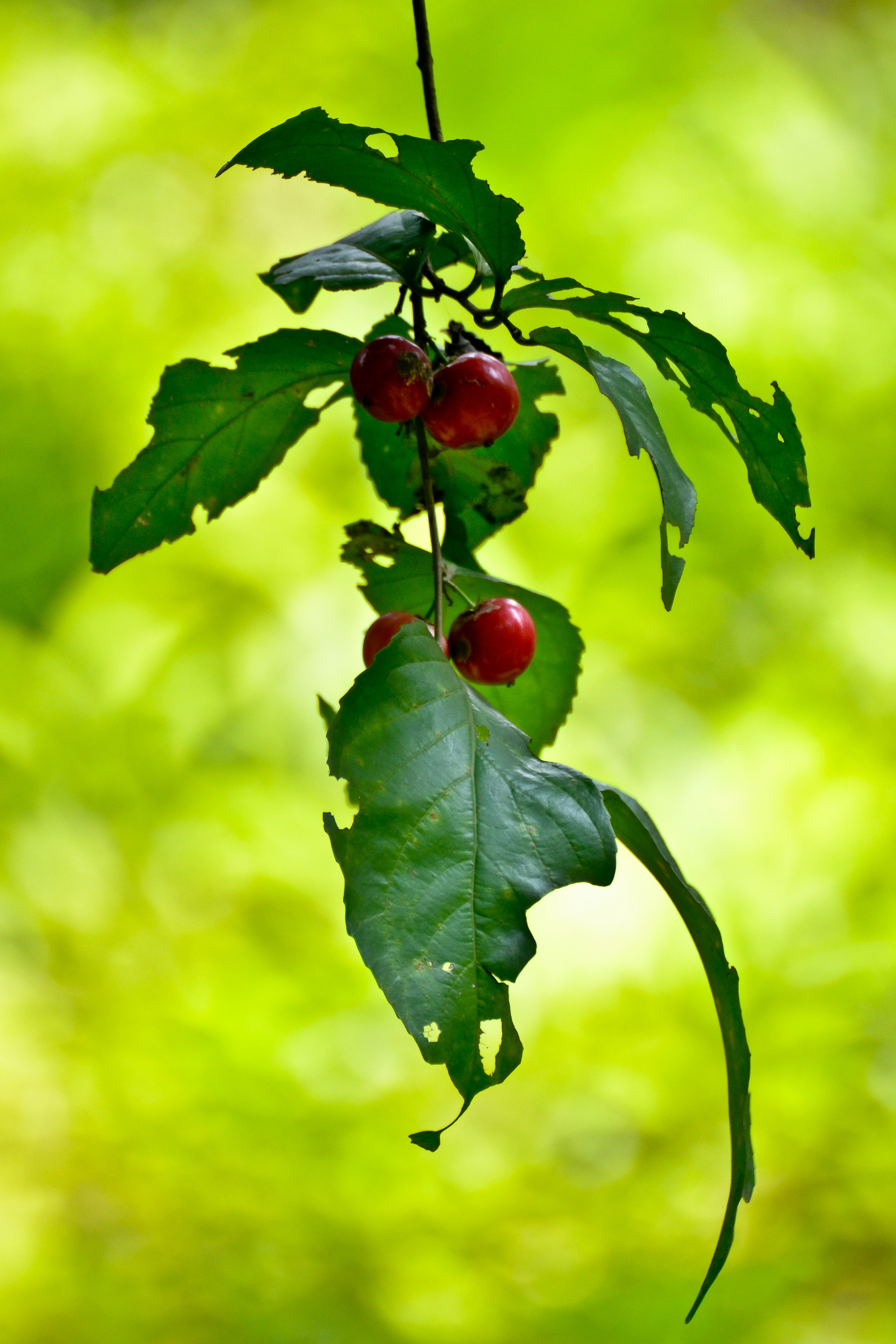

Scientific classification
- Kingdom: Plantae
- Clade: Tracheophytes
- Clade: Angiosperms
- Clade: Eudicots
- Clade: Rosids
- Order: Malpighiales
- Family: Salicaceae
- Genus: Flacourtia
- Species: F. inermis

Binomial name
- Flacourtia inermis (Burm. f.) Merr.

= Flacourtia inermis =

Species of flowering plant

Flacourtia inermis, known commonly as lovi-lovi, or batoko plum, is a species of flowering plant native to the Philippines and Indonesia, but which has naturalized around the edges of tropical Asia and Africa. Common names in Indonesia include tome-tome (Ternate, North Maluku), tomi-tomi (Ambon, Maluku), lovi-lovi, and lobi-lobi.

== Description ==
It is a medium-sized spineless tree that may grow up to 15 metres (49 feet). The mature leaves are oblong and elliptic in shape and glossy on the upper side, with a toothed margin. They are about 8 to 20 centimetres (3 to 8 inches) long and 3 to 15 cm (1 to 6 in) wide. The young leaves are bright orange to reddish in color, turning green as they mature.

The fruits are produced in bunches and resemble cherries. The fruit is round and shiny, turning from light green to a deep red colour upon ripening. Each fruit measures 1 to 3 cm (1/2 to 1 1/4 in) in diameter. The flesh is crunchy but sour and acidic in taste. Its fruit is rich in an antimicrobial agent-2,3-Dihydroxybenzoic acid.

=== Related species ===
The family Salicaceae includes well-known species such as kei apple (Dovyalis caffra), paniala (F. jangomas), and rukam (F. rukam).

== Uses ==
The fruits are edible raw or cooked but usually not eaten fresh, instead being used in jams, preserves, and syrups.
