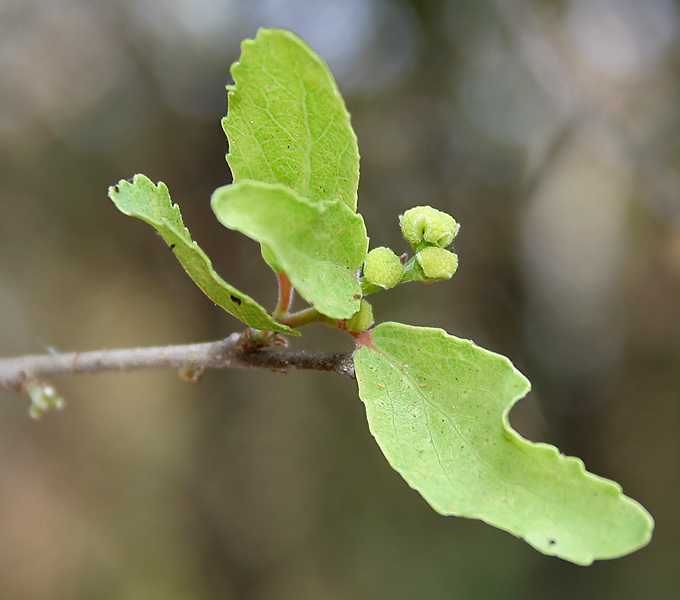
- Flacourtia indica

Scientific classification
- Kingdom: Plantae
- Clade: Embryophytes
- Clade: Tracheophytes
- Clade: Spermatophytes
- Clade: Angiosperms
- Clade: Eudicots
- Clade: Rosids
- Order: Malpighiales
- Family: Salicaceae
- Subfamily: Salicoideae
- Tribe: Saliceae
- Genus: Flacourtia; Comm. ex L'Hér.

Type species
- Flacourtia ramontchi L'Hér.

Species
- See text

Synonyms
- Donzellia Ten. in Index Seminum (NAP, Neapolitano) 1839: 11 (1839); Stigmarota Lour. in Fl. Cochinch.: 633 (1790); Thacombauia Seem. in Fl. Vit.: 426 (1873)

= Flacourtia =

Genus of flowering plants

Flacourtia is a genus of flowering plants in the family Salicaceae. It was previously placed in the now defunct family Flacourtiaceae. The generic name honors Étienne de Flacourt (1607–1660), a governor of Madagascar. It contains 23 species of shrubs and small trees that are native to the African and Asian tropics and subtropics. Several species, especially Flacourtia indica, are cultivated as ornamentals and for their fruits. The trunks of small trees are often guarded by branching spines.

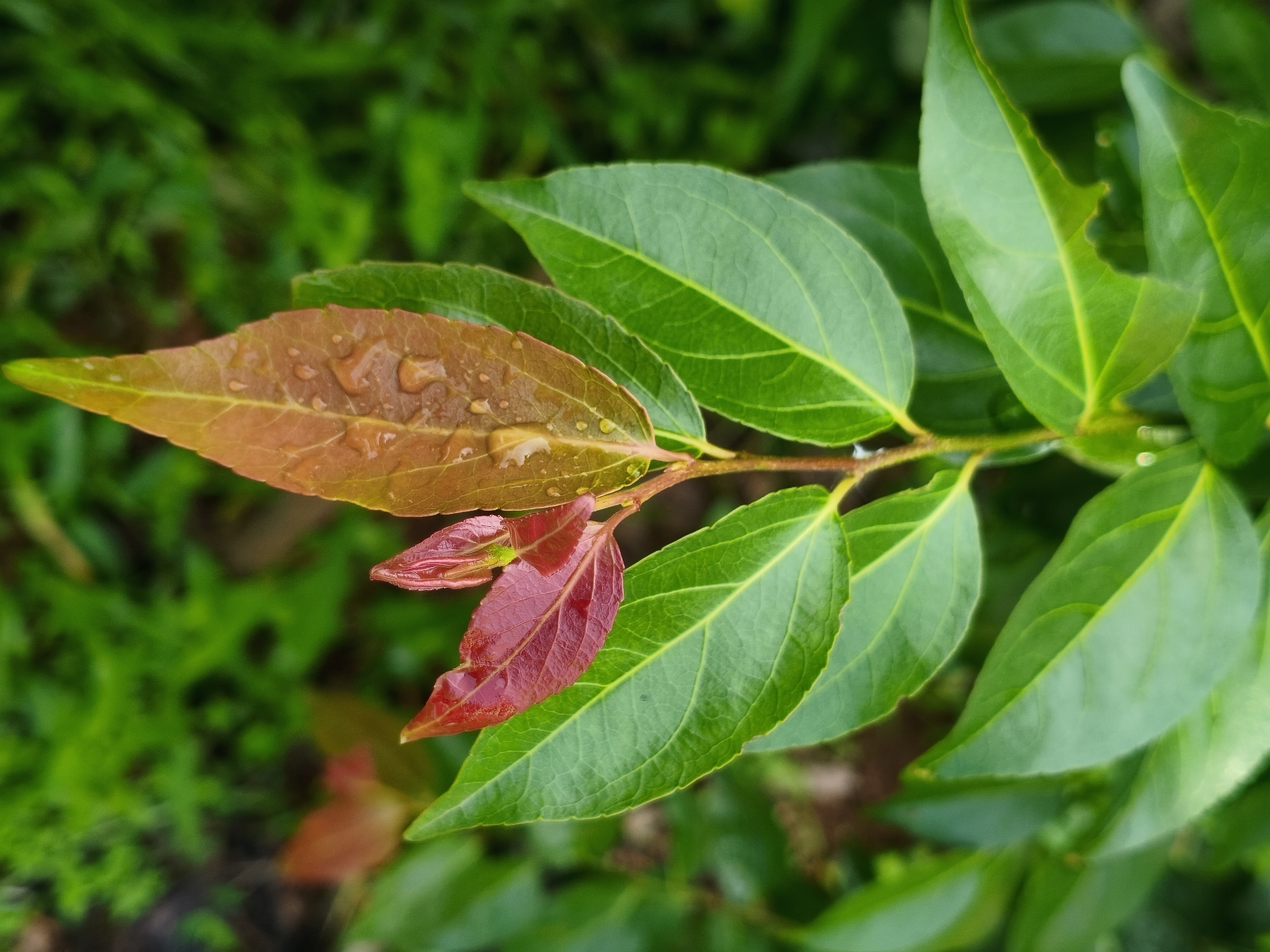
Leaves of a Flacourtia genus species

== Species ==
As accepted by Plants of the World Online;

- Flacourtia amalotricha A.C.Sm.
- Flacourtia cavaleriei H.Lév.
- Flacourtia degeneri A.C.Sm.
- Flacourtia flavescens Willd.
- Flacourtia helferi Gamble ex Ridl.
- Flacourtia indica (Burm.f.) Merr. – southern Asia, Madagascar
- Flacourtia inermis Roxb. (Batoko plum)
- Flacourtia jangomas (Lour.) Raeusch. – (Indian coffee plum) Tropical Asia
- Flacourtia kinabaluensis Sleumer
- Flacourtia latifolia (Hook.f. & Thomson) T.Cooke
- Flacourtia mollipila Sleumer
- Flacourtia mollis Hook.f. & Thomson
- Flacourtia montana J.Graham
- Flacourtia occidentalis Blatt.
- Flacourtia oppositifolia Gagnep.
- Flacourtia ramontchi L'Hér.
- Flacourtia rukam Zoll. & Moritzi – (Rukam) Indonesia
- Flacourtia subintegra A.C.Sm.
- Flacourtia territorialis Airy Shaw
- Flacourtia tomentella Miq.
- Flacourtia vitiensis (Seem.) A.C.Sm.
- Flacourtia vogelii Hook.f.
- Flacourtia zippelii Slooten

GRIN (United States Department of Agriculture and the Agricultural Research Service) only accepts 5 species; Flacourtia indica, Flacourtia inermis, Flacourtia jangomas, Flacourtia montana and Flacourtia rukam.

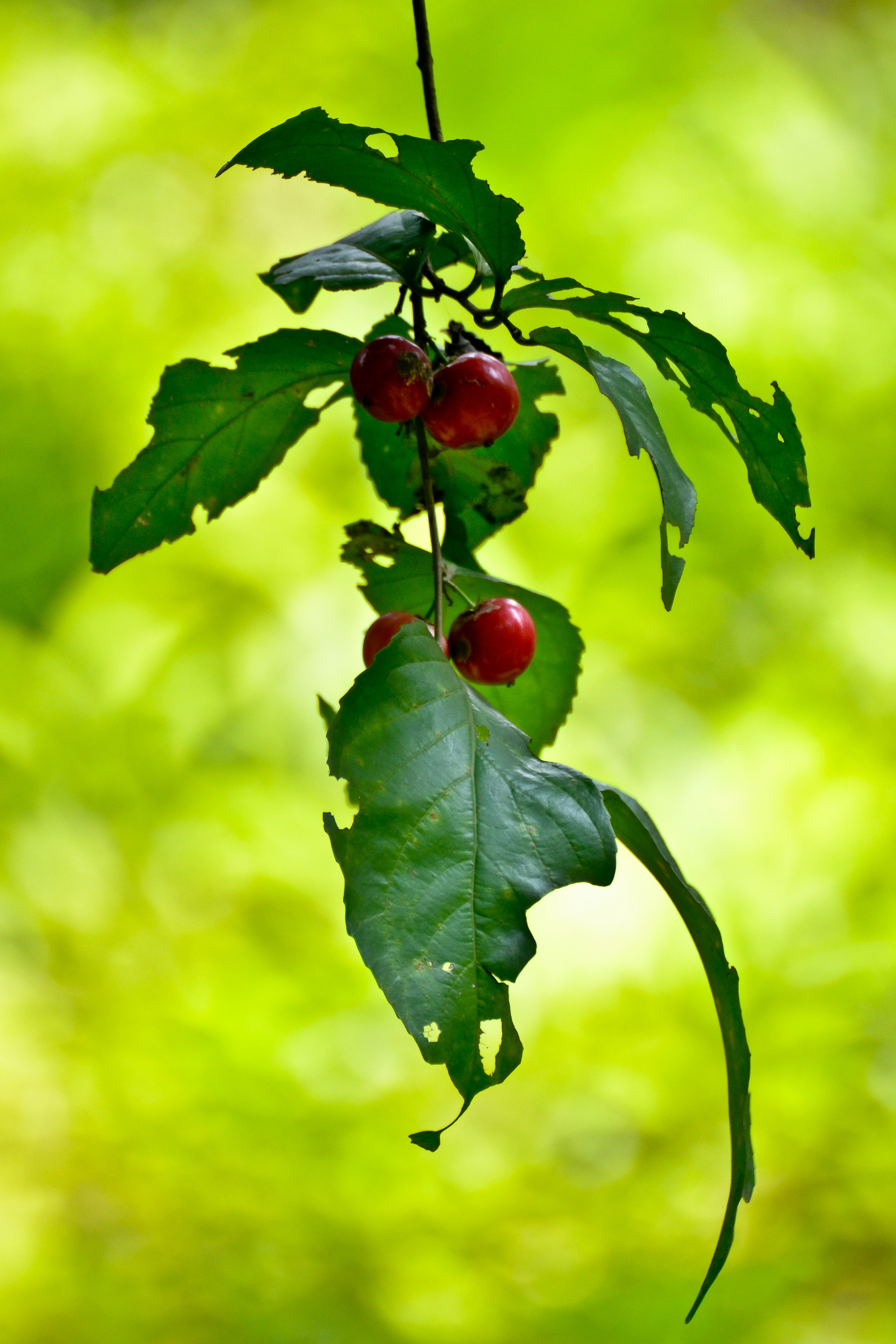
Flacourtia inermis

=== Formerly placed here ===
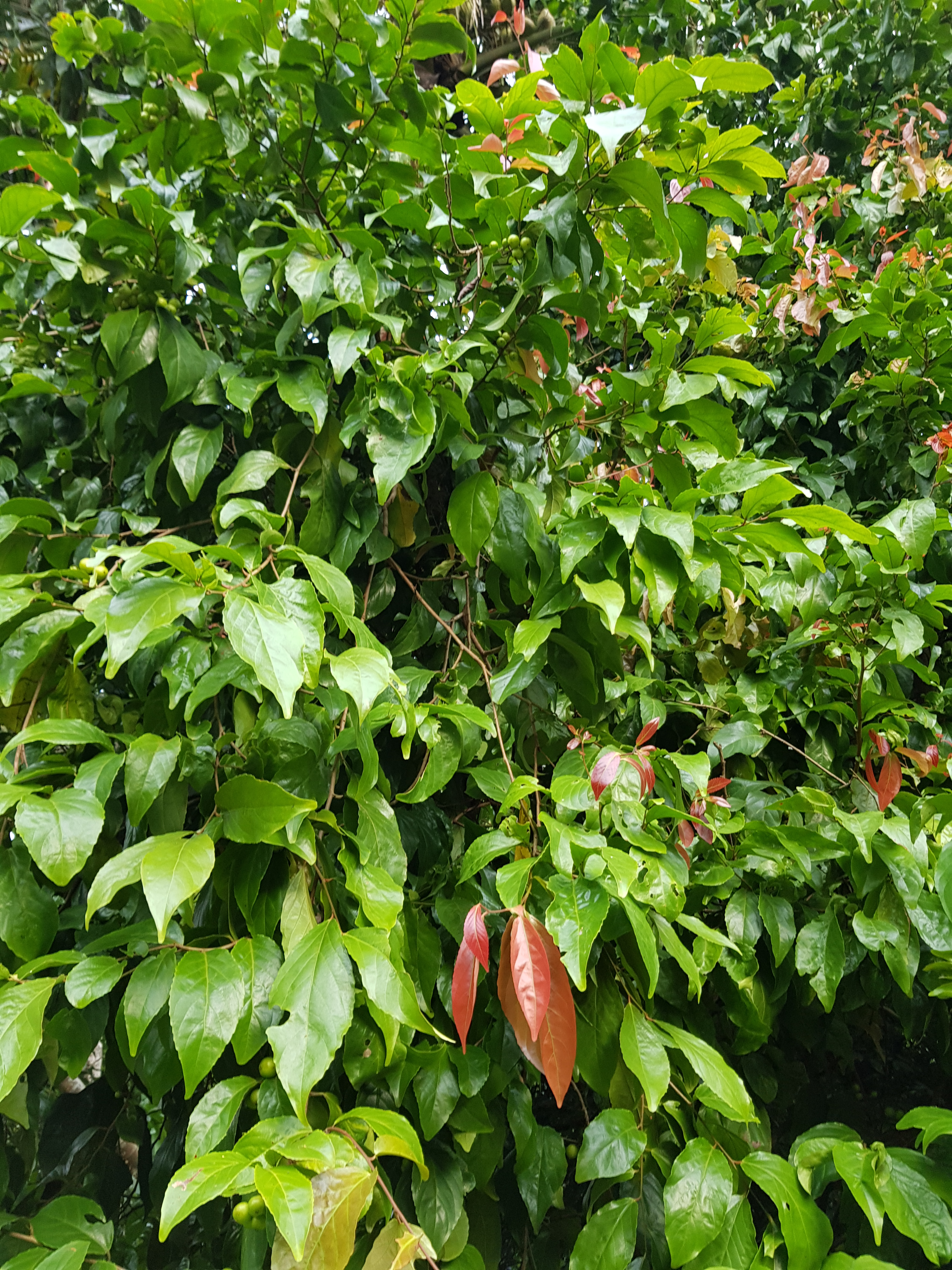
Lovi fruit

- Xylosma flexuosa (Kunth) Hemsl. (as F. flexuosa Kunth)
