= Flacourtia latifolia =

Conservation status
- Endangered (IUCN 2.3)

Scientific classification
- Kingdom: Plantae
- Clade: Tracheophytes
- Clade: Angiosperms
- Clade: Eudicots
- Clade: Rosids
- Order: Malpighiales
- Family: Salicaceae
- Genus: Flacourtia
- Species: F. latifolia

Binomial name
- Flacourtia latifolia (Hook.f. & Thomson) T.Cooke

Synonyms
- Flacourtia ramontchi var. latifolia Hook.f. & Thomson; Myroxylon latifolium (Hook.f. & Thomson) Kuntze; Xylosma latifolia Hook.f. & Thomson

Species of flowering plant

Flacourtia latifolia, synonym Xylosma latifolia, is a species of flowering plant in the family Salicaceae. It is a tree native to the Western Ghats of Karnataka and Kerala in southern India, where it grows in moist montane forest.
