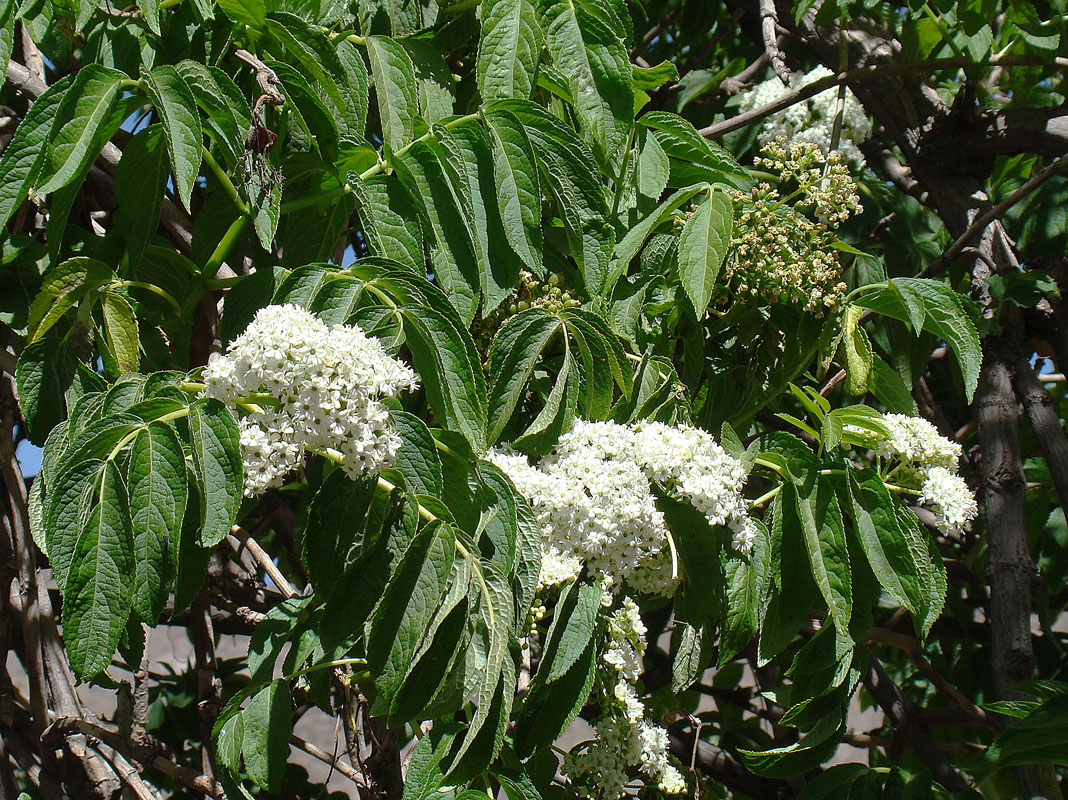
- Leaves and inflorescences

Conservation status
- Least Concern (IUCN 3.1)

Scientific classification
- Kingdom: Plantae
- Clade: Embryophytes
- Clade: Tracheophytes
- Clade: Spermatophytes
- Clade: Angiosperms
- Clade: Eudicots
- Clade: Asterids
- Order: Dipsacales
- Family: Viburnaceae
- Genus: Sambucus
- Species: S. peruviana

Binomial name
- Sambucus peruviana Kunth

Synonyms
- Sambucus canadensis var. oreopola (Donn.Sm.) Rehder; Sambucus graveolens Willd. ex Schult.; Sambucus nigra L. subsp. peruviana (Kunth) Bolli; Sambucus oreopola Donn.Sm.; Sambucus suaveolens DC.

= Sambucus peruviana =

Species of plant

Sambucus peruviana is a species of tree in the family Viburnaceae. It is native to Central America and South America.

== Description ==
Trees up to 8 m, irregular trunk. Leaves compound, with 7-9 ovate-oblong leaflets, margin serrate, acute apex, hairy underside. The inflorescences are cymes 18–22 cm long, with white fragrant flowers. The fruits are black berries 1.2 cm in diameter, with 3-5 seeds.

== Distribution and habitat ==
Sambucus peruviana is found from Costa Rica and Panama down the Andes south to northwestern Argentina between 2800 and 3900 m of elevation.

== Vernacular names ==
Sauco (Colombia, Peru, Bolivia), kiola (Argentina), r'ayan (Quechua language).

== Uses ==
The fruits can be made into jams, drinks, and wines. The leaves, flowers and fruits have medicinal properties; analgesic, antiinflammatory, antiseptic, sudorific. The wood is hard and resistant, used for construction, tools and making of quenas.
