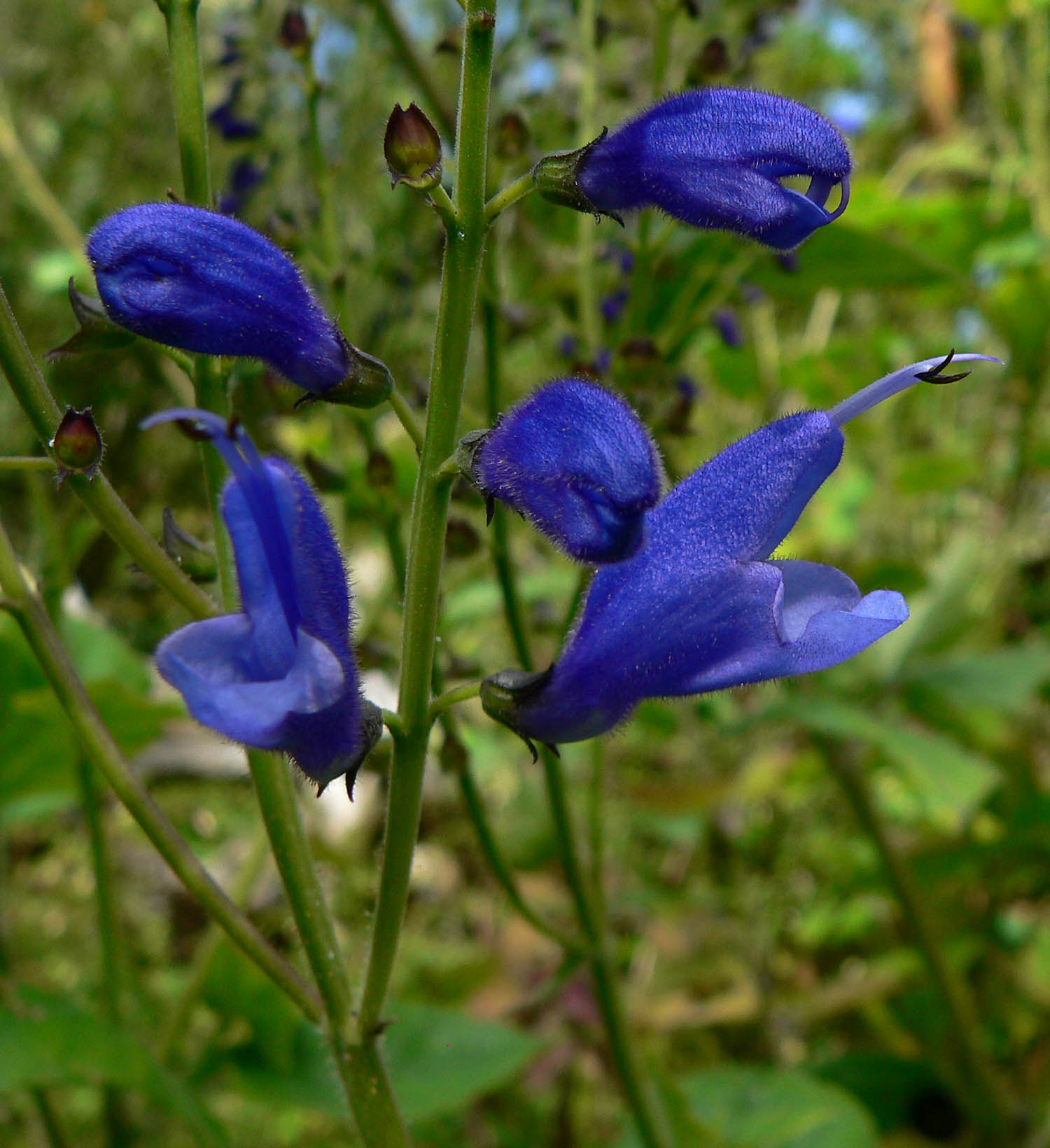

Scientific classification
- Kingdom: Plantae
- Clade: Tracheophytes
- Clade: Angiosperms
- Clade: Eudicots
- Clade: Asterids
- Order: Lamiales
- Family: Lamiaceae
- Genus: Salvia
- Species: S. cacaliifolia

Binomial name
- Salvia cacaliifolia Benth.

= Salvia cacaliifolia =

Species of flowering plant

Salvia cacaliifolia, the blue vine sage or Guatemalan sage, is a species of flowering plant in the family Lamiaceae, native to the mountains of Chiapas, Mexico, and in Guatemala and Honduras, at 1,500–2,500 m (4,921–8,202 ft) elevation. It has been available in the United Kingdom for many years, after being recognized by Irish gardener and journalist William Robinson in 1933. Since the 1970s, it has been available in the United States, after Strybing Arboretum and Huntington Botanical Gardens introduced it to California growers.

== Nomenclature ==
The specific epithet is sometimes spelt cacaliaefolia in the literature; however, cacaliifolia is accepted as the correct spelling. It means "with leaves like Cacalia (a genus which has been renamed).

== Description ==
It is an herbaceous perennial, blooming from midsummer to autumn with many pure gentian-blue flowers, about .5 inches long, with small green calyces. The leaves are grass-green in color with many hairs. The creeping rootstock spreads easily, forming clumps that are easily divided. It grows well in a temperate climate. However it does not tolerate freezing temperatures, so must be given protection in cold wet winters. It is easily propagated by cuttings.

This plant has gained the Royal Horticultural Society's Award of Garden Merit.
