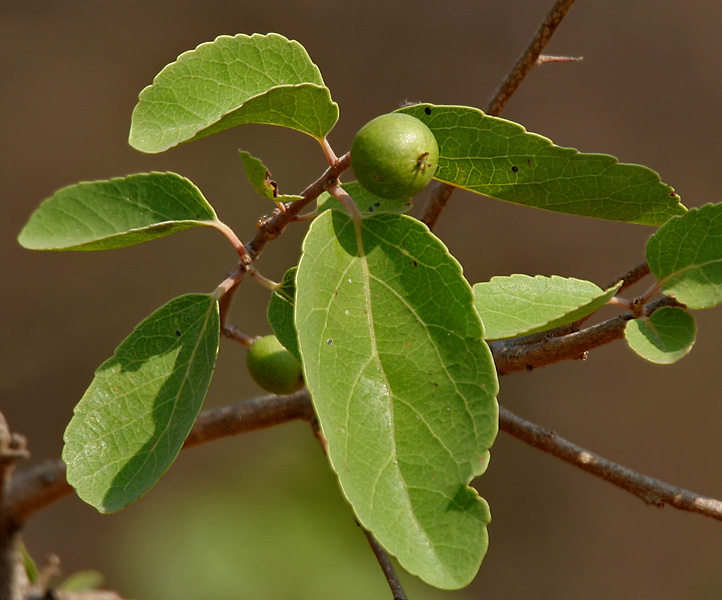

Conservation status
- Least Concern (IUCN 3.1)

Scientific classification
- Kingdom: Plantae
- Clade: Tracheophytes
- Clade: Angiosperms
- Clade: Eudicots
- Clade: Rosids
- Order: Malpighiales
- Family: Salicaceae
- Genus: Flacourtia
- Species: F. indica

Binomial name
- Flacourtia indica (Burm.f.) Merr.

Synonyms
- List: Gmelina indica Burm.f. in Fl. Indica: 132 (1768); Gmelina javanica Christm. in Vollst. Pflanzensyst. 2: 134 (1777); Flacourtia afra Pic.Serm. in Miss. Stud. Lago Tana 7(1): 97 (1951); Flacourtia balansae Gagnep. in Bull. Soc. Bot. France 55: 521 (1908); Flacourtia elliptica (Tul.) Warb. in H.G.A.Engler & K.A.E.Prantl, Nat. Pflanzenfam. 3(6a): 43 (1893); Flacourtia frondosa Clos in Ann. Sci. Nat., Bot., sér. 4, 8: 217 (1857); Flacourtia gambecola Clos in Ann. Sci. Nat., Bot., sér. 4, 8: 219 (1857); Flacourtia heterophylla Turcz. in Bull. Soc. Imp. Naturalistes Moscou 27(II): 331 (1854 publ. 1855); Flacourtia hilsenbergii C.Presl in Abh. Königl. Böhm. Ges. Wiss., ser. 5, 3: 441 (1845); Flacourtia hirtiuscula Oliv. in Fl. Trop. Afr. 1: 121 (1868); Flacourtia indica var. innocua (Haines) H.O.Saxena & Brahmam in Fl. Orissa 1: 79 (1994); Flacourtia kirkiana H.M.Gardner in Trees Shrubs Kenya: 21 (1936); Flacourtia lenis Craib in Bull. Misc. Inform. Kew 1916: 259 (1916); Flacourtia lucida Salisb. in Prodr. Stirp. Chap. Allerton: 366 (1796); Flacourtia obcordata Roxb. in Fl. Ind., ed. 1832. 3: 835 (1832); Flacourtia parvifolia Merr. in Lingnan Sci. J. 6: 328 (1928 publ. 1930); Flacourtia perrottetiana Clos in Ann. Sci. Nat., Bot., sér. 4, 8: 218 (1857); Flacourtia ramontchi var. renvoizei Fosberg in Kew Bull. 29: 254 (1974); Flacourtia rotundifolia Clos in Ann. Sci. Nat., Bot., sér. 4, 8: 218 (1857); Flacourtia rotundifolia Roxb. in Hort. Bengal.: 73 (1814), not validly publ.; Flacourtia sapida Roxb. in Pl. Coromandel 1: 49 (1796); Flacourtia sepiaria Roxb. in Pl. Coromandel 1: 48 (1796); Flacourtia sepiaria var. innocua Haines in unknown publication; Flacourtia thorelii Gagnep. in Bull. Soc. Bot. France 55: 522 (1908); Myroxylon dicline Blanco in Fl. Filip.: 813 (1837); Stigmarota africana Lour. in Fl. Cochinch.: 633 (1790); Stigmarota edulis Blanco in Fl. Filip., ed. 2.: 560 (1845); Xylosma elliptica Tul. in Ann. Sci. Nat., Bot., sér. 5, 9: 343 (1868); Verlangia indica Neck. ex Raf. in Sylva Tellur.: 34 (1838)

= Flacourtia indica =

Species of fruit and plant

Flacourtia indica (known commonly as ramontchi, governor's plum and Indian plum), is a species of flowering plant native to much of Africa and tropical and temperate parts of Asia. It has various uses, including folk medicine, fuel, animal food and human food.

== Description ==
This is a bushy shrub or tree with a spiny trunk and branches. In shrub form, it grows up to 25 feet (7.6 m), and as a tree, it reaches a maximum height around 50 feet (15 m). The drooping branches bear oval leaves. The seeds are dispersed by birds. This tree has thorns similar to that of a lime or lemon tree. If in contact with the thorns, it leaves a nasty stinging pain.

== Taxonomy ==
It is also commonly known as the 'batako' plum.

It was first described and published as Gmelina indica by Nicolaas Laurens Burman in Fl. Ind. 132, t. 39, fig. 5 in 1768, it was then re-published as Flacourtia indica by Elmer Drew Merrill in Interpr. Herb. Amboin. on page 377 in 1917.

F. indica and Flacourtia ramontchi (the Madagascar plum) are treated as separate species, including by Plants of the World Online, but not by GRIN (United States Department of Agriculture and the Agricultural Research Service).

== Distribution ==
It is native to the countries (and regions) of Bangladesh, Botswana, Burundi, Cambodia, China (southeastern and Hainan), Comoros, Democratic Republic of the Congo, Republic of the Congo, Ethiopia, India (Assam, Laccadive Islands), Indonesia (Java, Lesser Sunda Islands and Sulawesi), Kenya, Laos, Madagascar, Malawi, Malaysia, Mozambique, Myanmar, Namibia, Nepal, Pakistan, Philippines, Rwanda, Seychelles (Aldabra ), Singapore, Somalia, Sri Lanka, South Africa (Cape Provinces, KwaZulu-Natal and Northern Provinces), Sudan, Tanzania, Thailand, Uganda, Vietnam, Zambia and Zimbabwe.

It has been introduced into various places such as Angola, Bahamas, Chad, Dominican Republic, Hawaii, Jamaica, Leeward Islands, Mauritius, Nicobar Islands, Puerto Rico, (Island of) Réunion, Society Islands, Trinidad and Tobago.

== Uses ==
The ramontchi fruit itself is about an inch thick and red ripening purple. It is very fleshy and has 6 to 10 seeds in layered carpels. The pulp is yellow or white and sweet with an acidic tang. It is eaten raw or made into jelly or jam. It can be fermented to make wine.

The leaves and roots are used in herbal medicine for treatment of snakebite. The bark is believed to be effective for arthritis. Most parts of the plant are used for cough, pneumonia, and bacterial throat infection. It has also been used for diarrhoea.

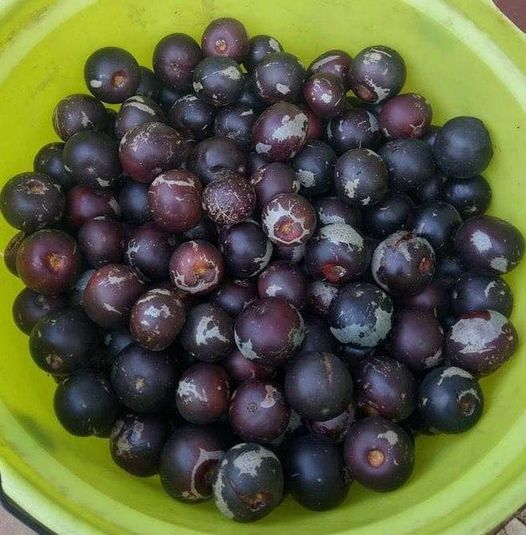
The fruits of Flacourtia indica

In India, it is used in folk medicine to treat functional disorders like rheumatoid arthritis and gout. Its berries are edible, and the bark can be triturated (ground) with sesamum oil and then used as alignment of rheumatism. Similarly, the extract of its fruit has diuretic, hepatoprotective, and antidiabetic properties (Patro et al. 2013). As it contains a glucoside ('Flacourside'), and 'Flacourtin' (an ester).

Antimalarial compounds have been found in the aerial parts of Flacourtia indica.

The tree is planted as a living fence; it was one of the species used for the Indian Inland Customs Line. The wood is used for firewood and small wooden tools such as plough handles.

== Cultivation ==
The plant is known as an occasionally invasive introduced species in some areas. It has been cultivated in Florida in the United States, and today, it occurs as a weed in some parts of the state.
