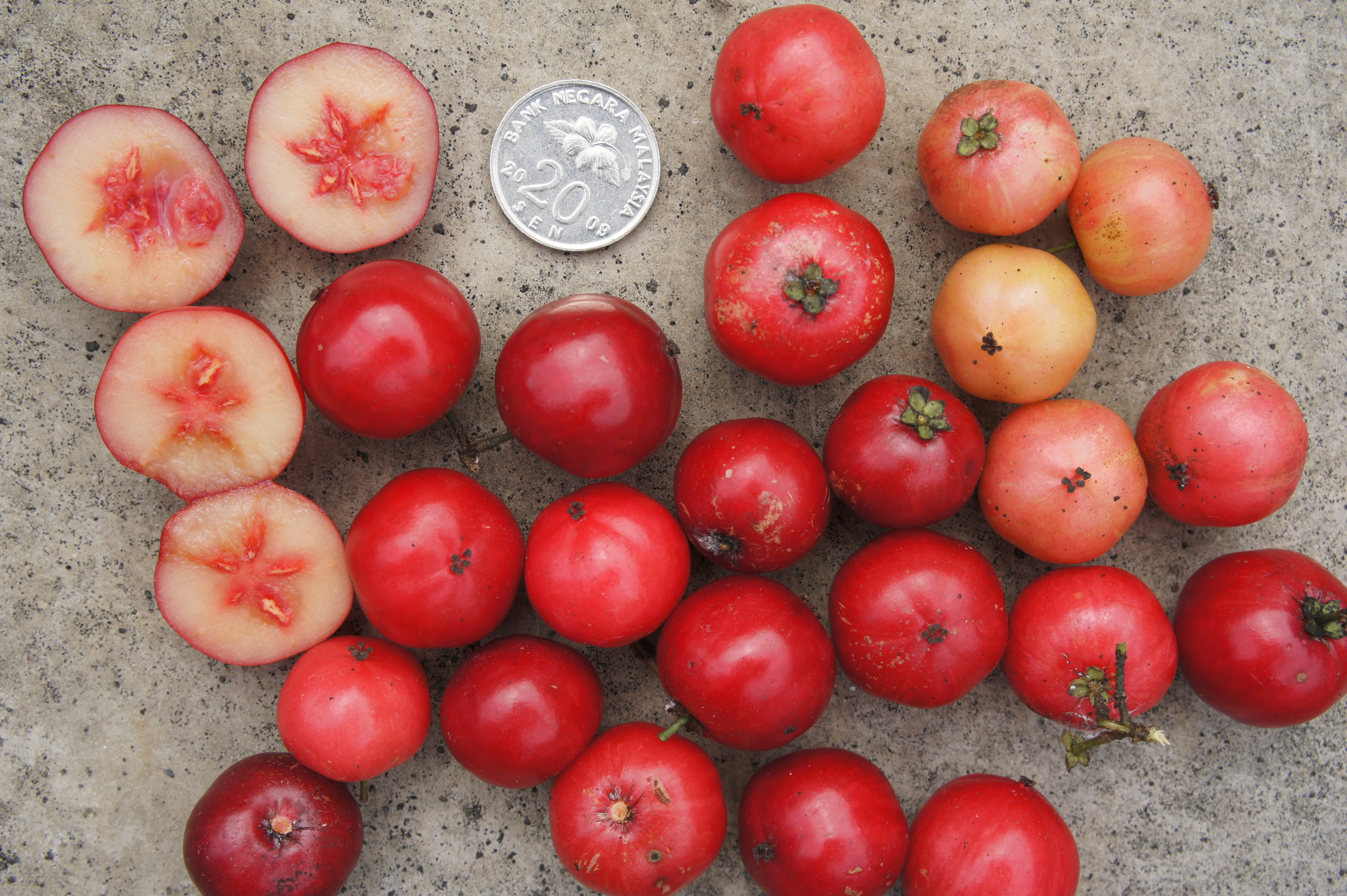

Scientific classification
- Kingdom: Plantae
- Clade: Tracheophytes
- Clade: Angiosperms
- Clade: Eudicots
- Clade: Rosids
- Order: Malpighiales
- Family: Salicaceae
- Genus: Flacourtia
- Species: F. rukam

Binomial name
- Flacourtia rukam Zoll. & Moritzi

Synonyms
- Flacourtia euphlebia

= Flacourtia rukam =

Species of fruit and plant

Flacourtia rukam is a species of flowering plant in the family Salicaceae. It is native to Island Southeast Asia and Melanesia, but has spread into Mainland Southeast Asia, India, and Polynesia. It is also cultivated for its edible fruit. Common names include rukam, governor's plum, Indian plum, and Indian prune.

This species is a tree growing 5 to 15 meters tall. The trunk is lined with thorns up to 10 centimeters long; some cultivated varieties lack thorns. New leaves are red to brown in color. Mature leaves are somewhat oval in shape with toothed edges and up to 16 centimeters long by 7 wide. Racemes of yellow-green male and female flowers occur in the leaf axils. The rounded fruit is about 2 centimeters long and is green, red, or purple in color.
