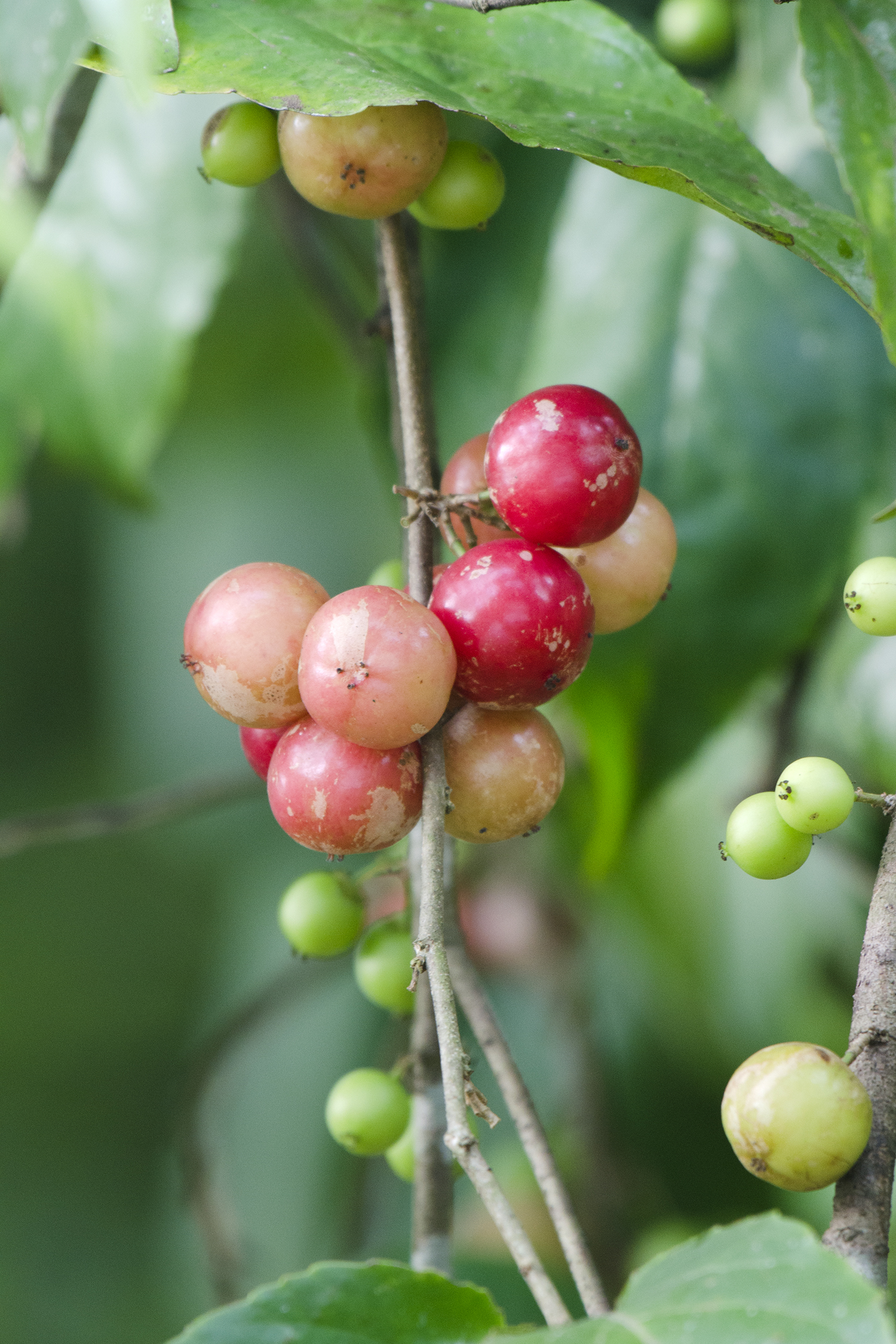
- Lubika

Scientific classification
- Kingdom: Plantae
- Clade: Embryophytes
- Clade: Tracheophytes
- Clade: Spermatophytes
- Clade: Angiosperms
- Clade: Eudicots
- Clade: Rosids
- Order: Malpighiales
- Family: Salicaceae
- Genus: Flacourtia
- Species: F. jangomas

Binomial name
- Flacourtia jangomas (Lour.) Raeusch.

Synonyms
- Flacourtia cataphracta Roxburgh ex Willdenow.; Rumea jangomas (Lour.) Spreng.; Stigmarota jangomas Lour.; Xylosma borneensis Ridl.

= Flacourtia jangomas =

Species of flowering plant in the willow family

Flacourtia jangomas is a species of flowering plant in the family Salicaceae. This lowland and mountain rain forest tree is sometimes referred to by the English common names Indian coffee plum, Indian plum, or scramberry.

It was once placed in the Flacourtiaceae family. It is widely cultivated in Southeast and East Asia, and has escaped cultivation in a number of places. Its wild origin is unknown but is speculated to be tropical Asia, most likely India and Sri Lanka.

== Description ==
=== Tree ===
Flacourtia jangomas is a small, deciduous shrub or tree that grows to a height of 6–10 m (20–33 ft). Trunk and branches are commonly thornless in old trees, but densely beset with simple or branched, blunt woody thorns when younger. Bark is light-brown to copper-red with a flaky texture and the leaves are light green and narrow ovate in shape. The leaves and roots contain tannin.

=== Flowers and fruit ===
It produces small white to whitish green fragrant flowers. The relatively juicy fruits are rounded pink to dark red and about 0.6–1 inch (1.5–2.5 cm) wide. The flesh is greenish yellow. The plant is dioecious, having separate reproductive organs on different individuals, producing either male or female flowers.

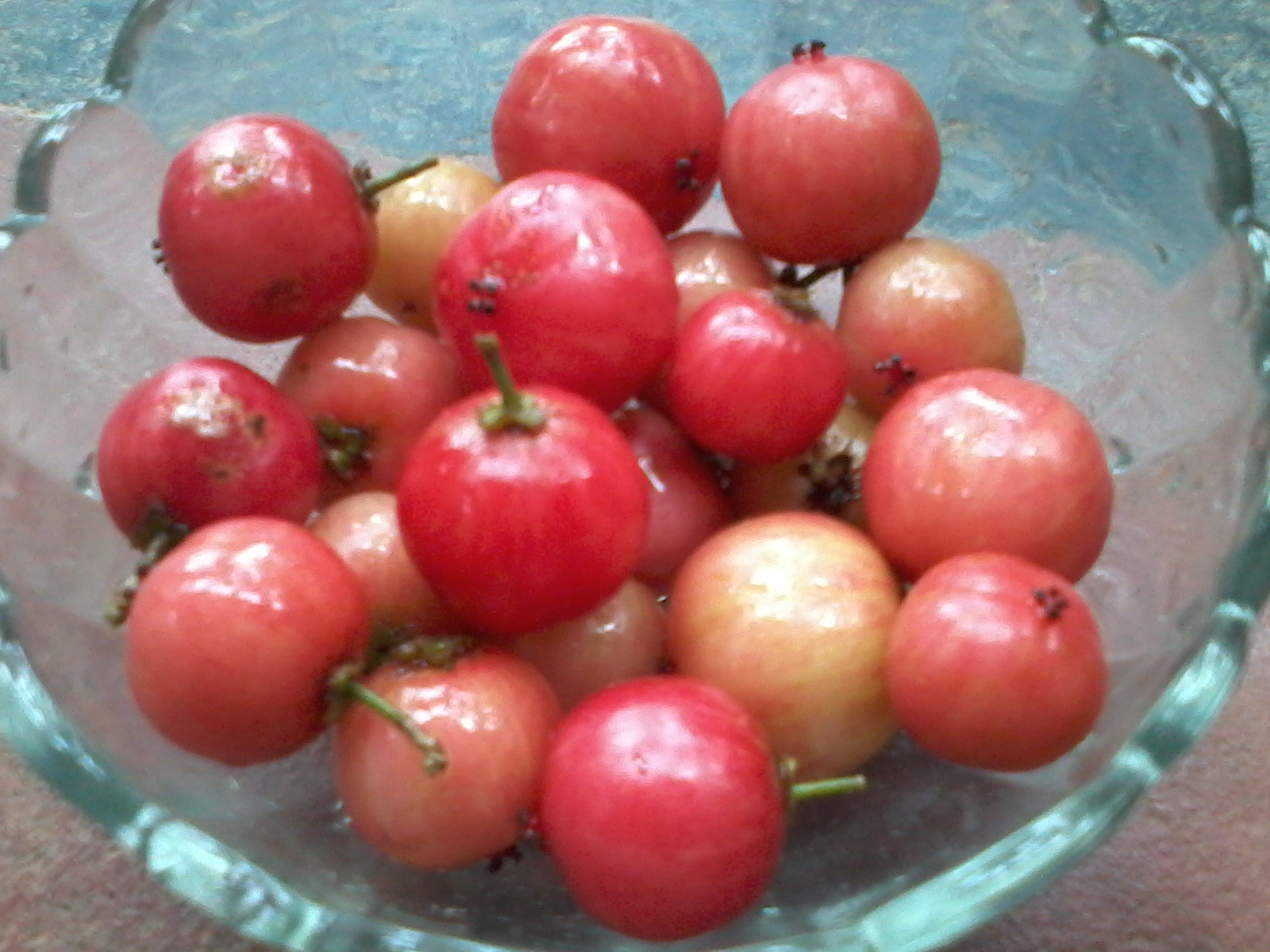
Close up of F. jangomas fruit

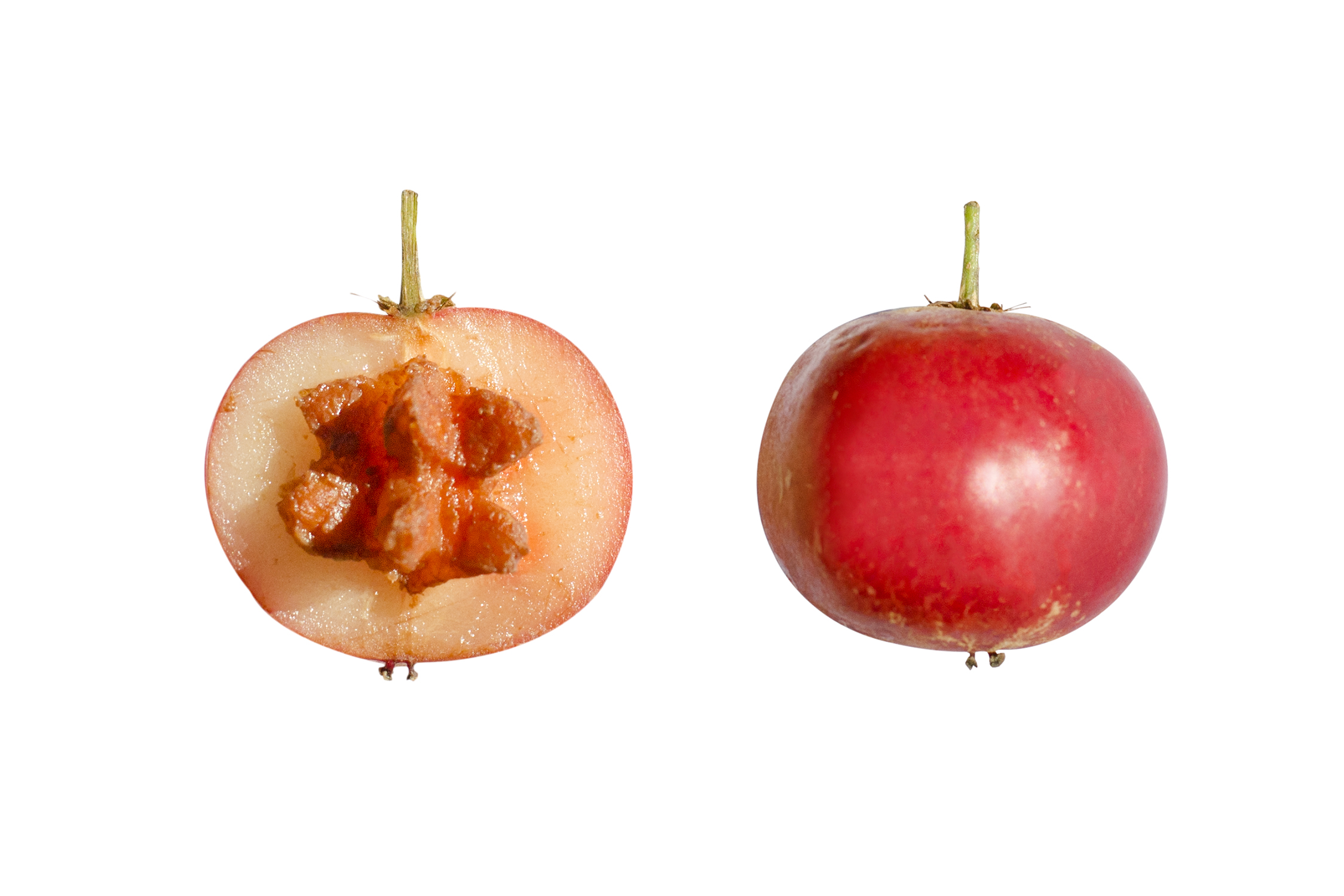
Lubika fruit cross section

== Distribution ==
It is native to Assam, Tripura, Bangladesh, South-Central and Southeast China, East Himalaya, Hainan, Myanmar, and Nepal. It is found as an introduced species in Borneo, Cambodia, the Cook Islands, Fiji, India, Java, Kenya, Laos, the Leeward Islands, Malaysia, Mauritius, New Caledonia, the Nicobar Islands, Queensland, Réunion, the Seychelles, Tanzania, Thailand, Trinidad and Tobago, Venezuela, Vietnam, and the Windward Islands.

== Ecology ==
The plant is considered one of the primary host plants of the Queensland fruit fly (Bactrocera tryoni).

== Common names ==
- Bengali: ŧipa fol (লুকলুকি)
- Assamese: poniol (পনিয়ল)
- English: Indian coffee plum, Indian sour cherry, rukam, runeala plum, scramberry
- Hindi: talispatri (तालिसपत्री), Pani amla (पानी आमला)
- Kokborok: pesla, supra
- Manipuri: heitroi (হৈত্ৰোঈ)
- Konkanni: Jagomma
- Thai: takhob
- Rohingya, Chittagonian: fainná gula
- Sanskrit: sruvavrksha, vikankatah (स्रुववृक्ष)
- Sylheti: lukluki (ꠟꠥꠇꠟꠥꠇꠤ), kulkuli (ꠇꠥꠟꠇꠥꠟꠤ)
- Malayalam: lubikka (ലൂബിക്ക), luvikka (ലൂവിക്ക), lovlolika (ലൗലോലിക്ക), lololikka, vayyamkaitha
- Tamil: vaiyyankarai
- Mizo: sakhi thei
- Malay: kerkut
- Castellano Panama: uva de monte, uvita, guinda
- Kundapura Kannada: Chape (ಚಾಪೆ)

== Uses ==
=== Food ===
Flacourtia jangomas fruits are widely eaten around South Asia, both raw and cooked. They are noted for their mild sour and tangy taste. The fruits are pickled, salt-dried or cooked in Indian curries. They can also be blended into juices or made into jams and marmalades which are immensely popular in Southern India. Commercially produced coffee plum jams and pickles are exported across the world by various companies, mainly from Kerala.

=== Medicine ===
In South Asian folkloric medicine, the fruits and leaves of Indian coffee plum are used against diarrhea. Dried leaves are reportedly effective for bronchitis and roots are said to suppress toothache. The bark of Flacourtia jangomas has various antifungal and antibacterial constituents which makes it an important ingredient for a few Ayurvedic drugs. Ground bark paste is also used for curing many common ailments in the tribal settlements of Western Ghat.

=== Lumber ===
The wood is sometimes harvested for lumber in the Indian states of Tamil Nadu, Kerala and Karnataka. It is often used as a cheaper alternative to Teak and other expensive wood.
