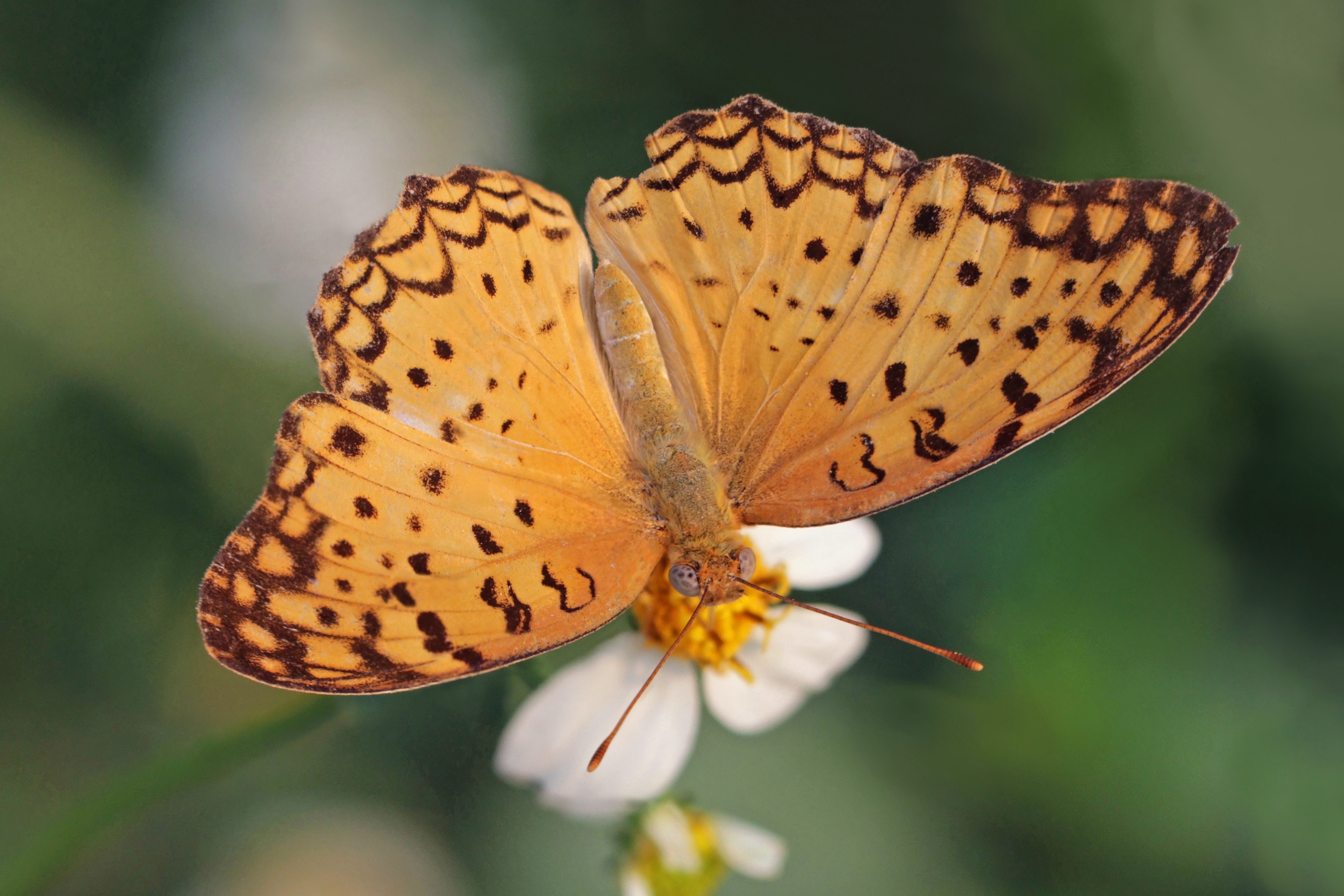
- P. p. phalantha Lumbini, Nepal

Scientific classification
- Kingdom: Animalia
- Phylum: Arthropoda
- Clade: Pancrustacea
- Class: Insecta
- Order: Lepidoptera
- Family: Nymphalidae
- Genus: Phalanta
- Species: P. phalantha

Binomial name
- Phalanta phalantha (Drury, [1773])

Synonyms
- Papilio phalantha Drury, [1773]; Papilio columbina Cramer, [1779]; Atella phalanta; Atella araca Waterhouse & Lyell, 1914

= Phalanta phalantha =

Common leopard

Species of butterfly

Phalanta phalantha, the common leopard or spotted rustic, is a sun-loving butterfly of the nymphalid or brush-footed butterfly family.

== Description ==
The common leopard is a medium-sized butterfly with a wingspan of 50–55 mm with a tawny colour and marked with black spots. The underside of the butterfly is more glossy than the upper and both the male and female are similar looking. A more prominent purple gloss on the underside is found in the dry-season form of this butterfly.

Male aud female. Upperside bright yellowish-ochreous. Forewing with two black short slender sinuous bars across middle of the cell, a similar darker pair at its end, followed beyond by a short broad sinuous streak from the costa to the lower radial, and is then succeeded below the cell by an inwardly-oblique series of four irregular-shaped spots, and beyond by a medial-discal transverse row of similarly disposed narrow spots, an outer-discal row of round spots, then an inner submarginal sinuous line, confluent with an outer straight line, and a marginal row of triangular spots. Hindwing with a slightly-defined slender black lunule within the cell, two before its end, and two also above it; a transverse inner-discal irregular series of slender lunules which are slightly pale bordered externally; a medial-discal row of four larger black oval spots, two submarginal sinuous slightly confluent lines, and marginal triangular spots.

Underside paler, and with all the markings, as on upperside much less defined; the interspaces of cell-bars and outer markings suffused with violet-grey, and the inner-discal series outwardly bordered with greyish lunules. In some specimens, presumably dry-season, all the markings on the upper and underside are less prominent.

Body and palpi above yellowish-ochreous; beneath and also femora beneath greyish-white; tibia and tarsi pale ochreous; antennae ochreous-brown.

— Frederic Moore, Lepidoptera Indica. Vol. IV

== Distribution and subspecies ==
The butterfly is found in Subsaharan Africa and southern Asia (including India, Bangladesh, Sri Lanka, and Myanmar) in a number of subspecies.

- P. p. phalantha
- P. p. luzonica Fruhstofer (Philippines)
- P. p. columbina (Cramer) (southern China, Hainan and possibly Taiwan)
- P. p. araca (Waterhouse & Lyell, 1914) (Australia)
- P. p. aethiopica (Rothschild & Jordan, 1903) (Madagascar, Seychelles, Aldabra, Comoro, Tropical Africa)
- P. p. granti (Rothschild & Jordan, 1903) (Socotra Island)

Torben Larsen developed a species numbering system for his 2005 publication Butterflies of West Africa. The subspecies aethiopica is #1200. The 'Larsen' numbers have since been used with permission in A Sharp Eye on Butterflies of Ghana.

== Status ==
It is widely distributed and abundant; from the tops of hills in Sri Lanka and southern India and up to 3000 m in the Himalayas, as well as the whole of Subsaharan Africa.

== Habits ==
Sun loving and avoids shade. Seen in the plains, gardens, and edges of clearings. Has active and sharp flight movements. Visits flowers regularly especially Lantana, Duranta, Meyenia laxiflora, Gymnosporia montana, and thistles. Often seen mudpuddling from damp patches in the ground, either alone or in groups. A regular basker with wings spread wide open. It is commonest in dry areas and dry weather and absent from the wetter parts of India during the monsoon. It often perches on edges of clearing with wings half open and has the habit of chasing away other butterflies and guarding its territory.

== Larval host plants ==
Food plants are species of family Bixaceae. It has been recorded breeding on Flacourtia indica, Flacourtia montana, Smilax, Xylosma longifolium, and Salix.

Larval host plants recorded from families Acanthaceae, Compositae, Flacourtiaceae, Primulaceae, Salicaceae, Rubiaceae, Violaceae and specific plants are Barleria prionitis, Canthium parviflorum, Coffea arabica, Dovyalis caffra, Dovyalis gardnerii, Dovyalis hebecarpa, Dovyalis macrocalyx, Dovyalis rotundifolia, Flacourtia indica, Flacourtia inermis, Flacourtia jangomas, Flacourtia montana, Flacourtia ramontchii, Mangifera indica, Maytenus buchanii, Melaleuca leucadendra, Petalostigma quadriloculare, Populus alba, Populus × canescens, Populus deltoides, Salix babylonica, Salix tetrasperma, Salix warburgii, Scolopia chinensis, Scolopia oldhami, Scolopia scolopia, Smilax tetragona, Tridax procumbens, Trimeria grandifolia, Xylosma racemosa.

== Life cycle gallery ==
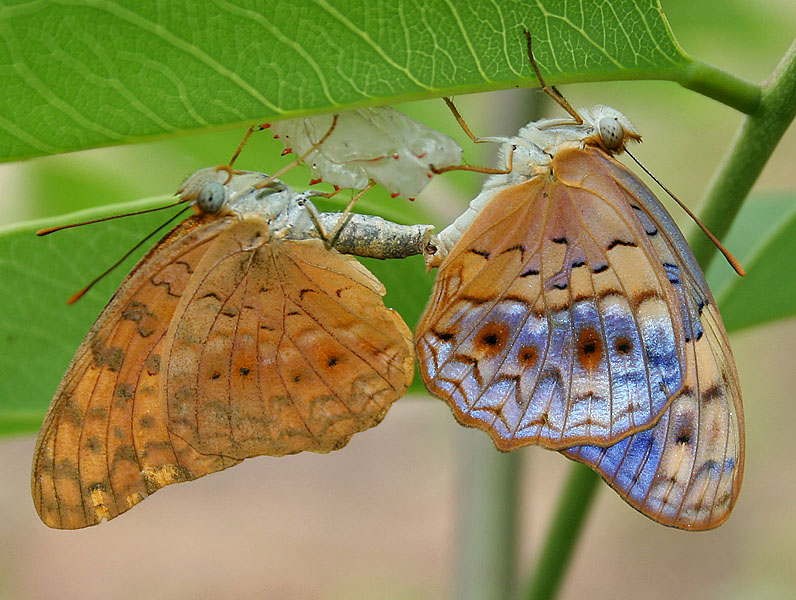
Mating with butterfly newly emerged from a pupa in Hyderabad, India

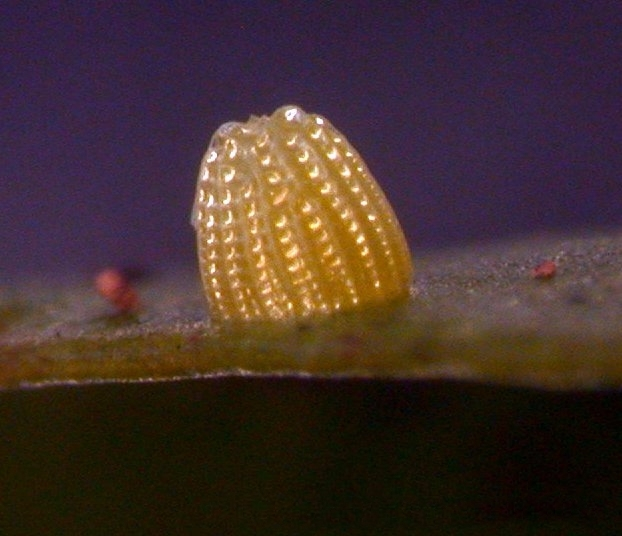
Egg

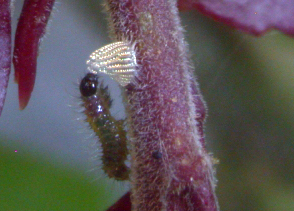
Larva

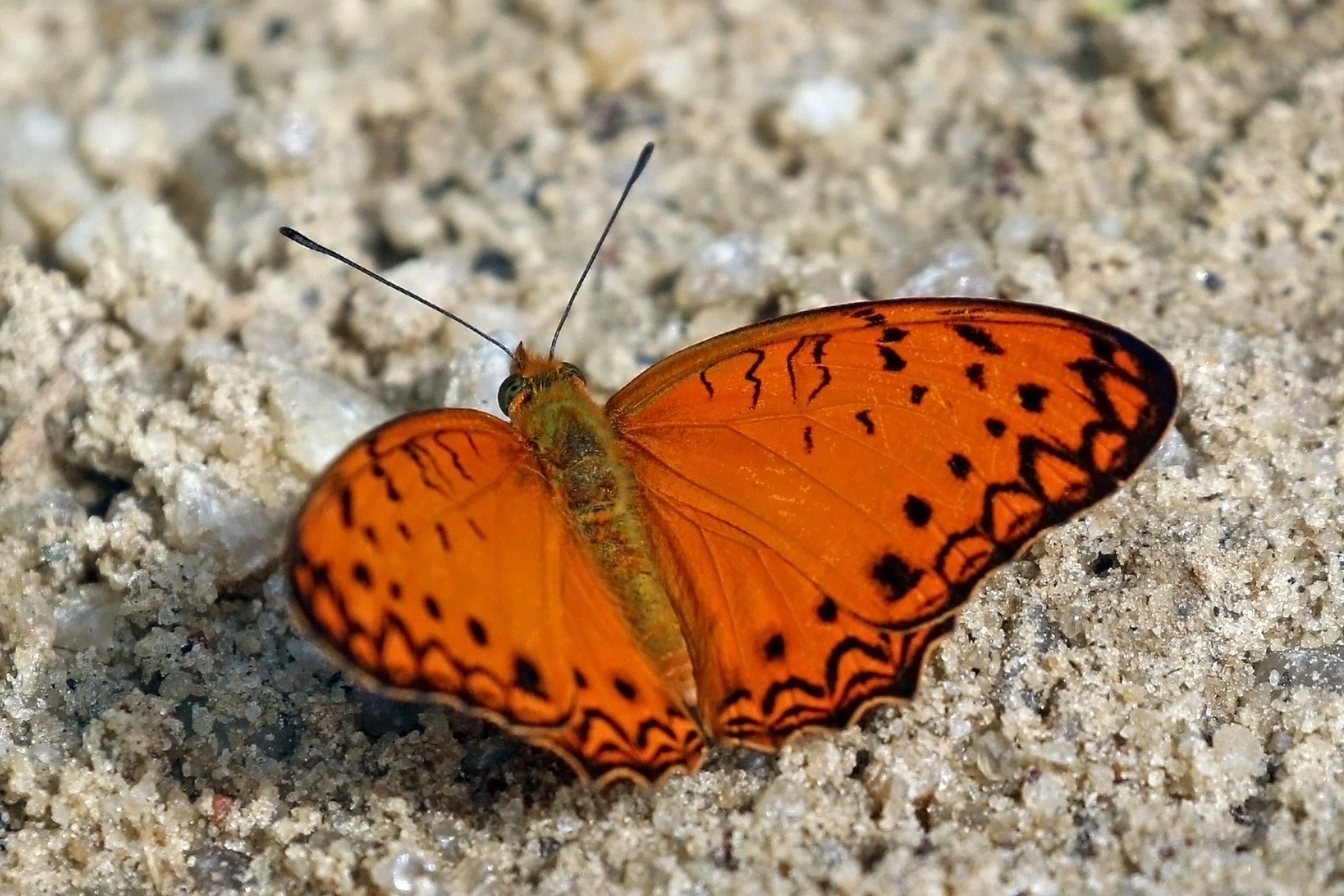
P. p. aethiopica
Queen Elizabeth Park, Uganda

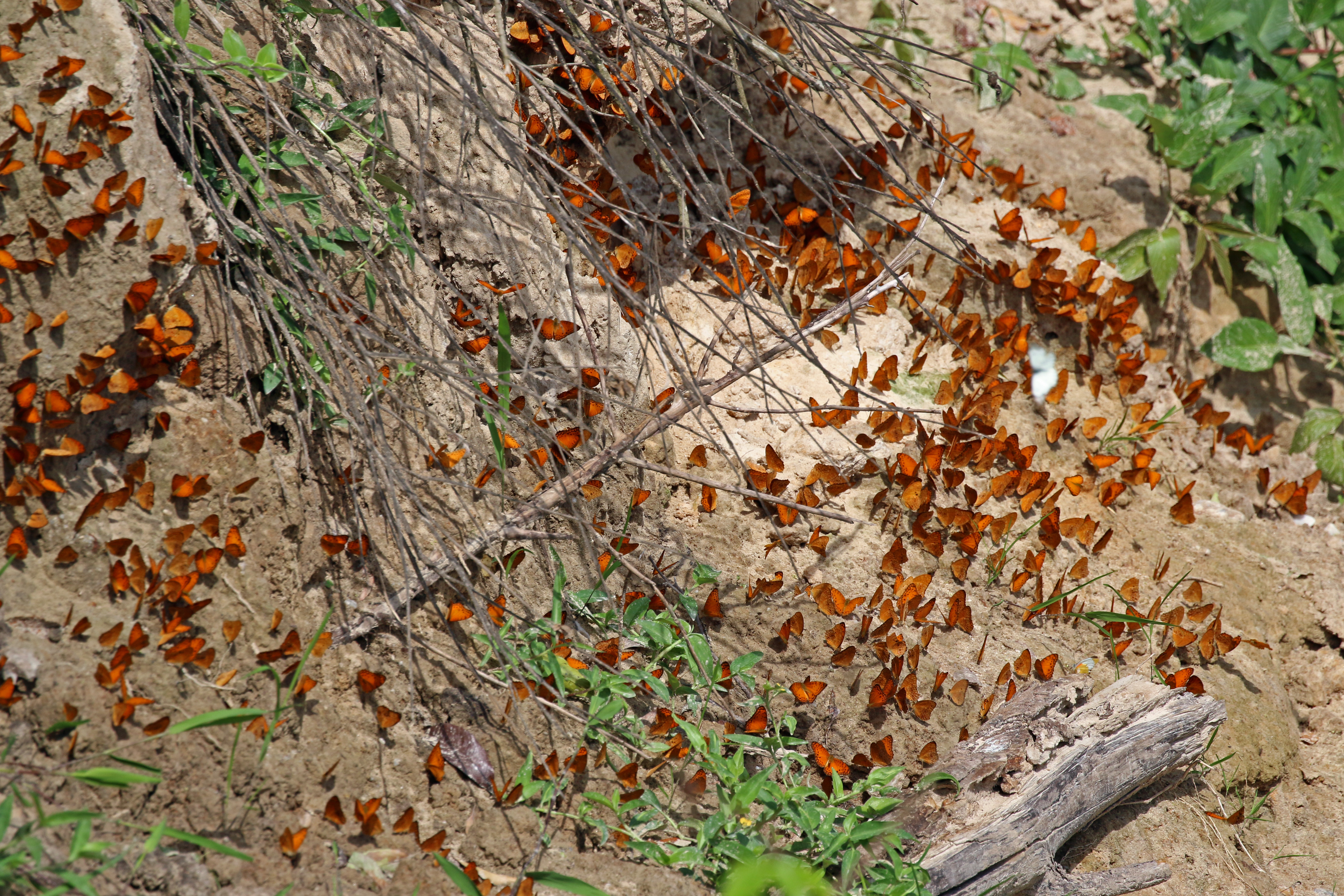
puddling, Uganda

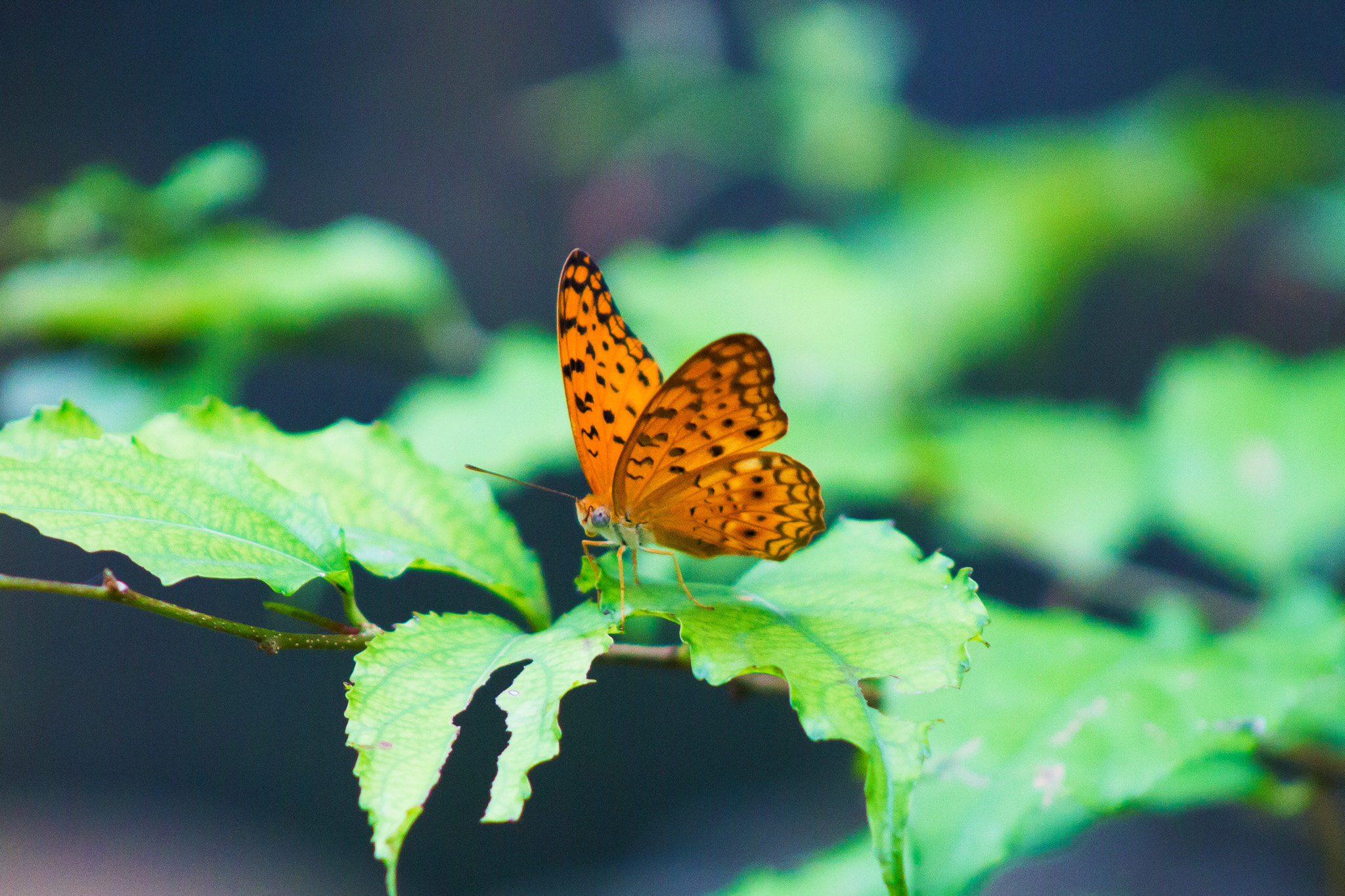
Sri Lanka

== See also ==
- Nymphalidae
- List of butterflies of India
- List of butterflies of India (Nymphalidae)
