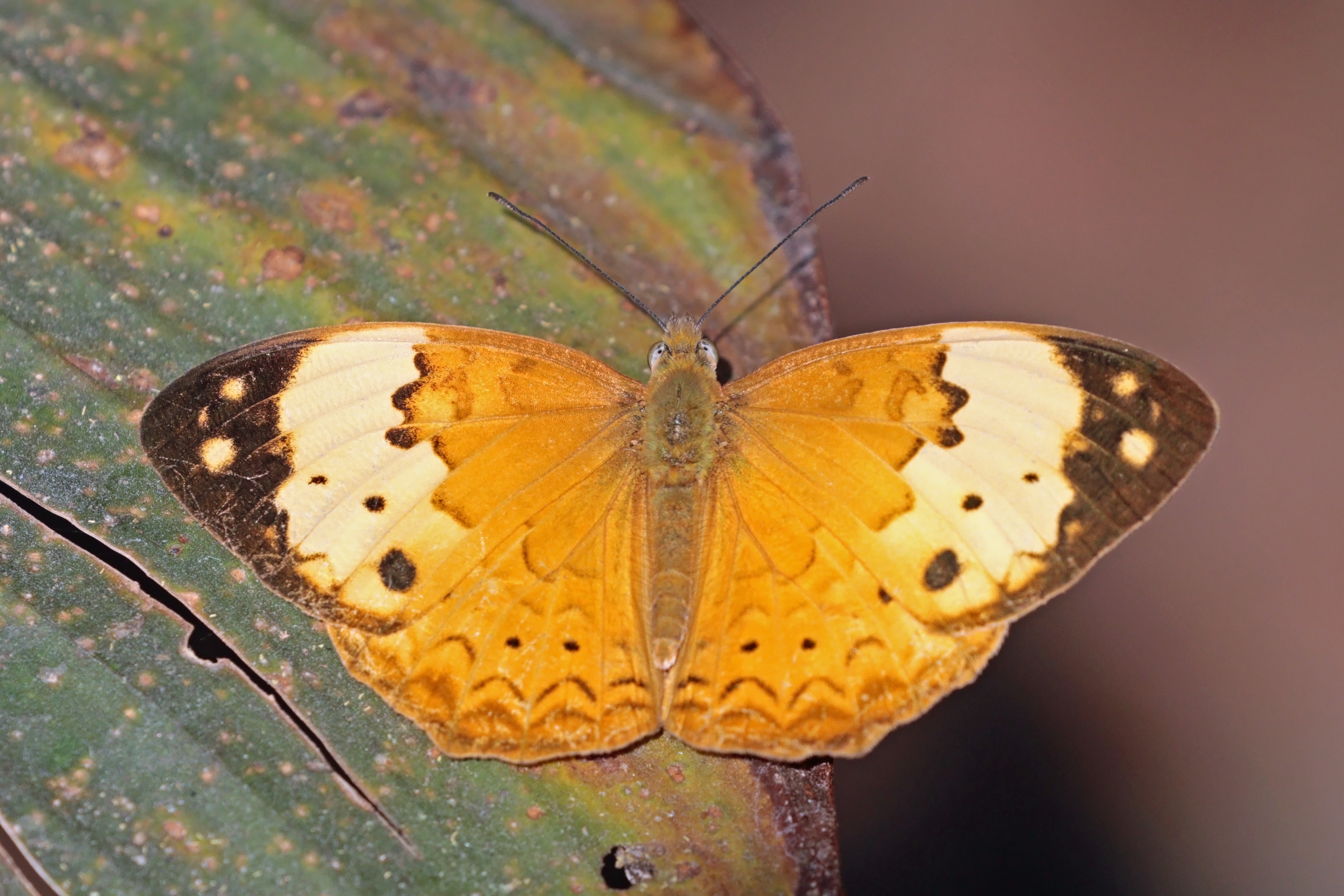
- C. e. lotis, Nepal
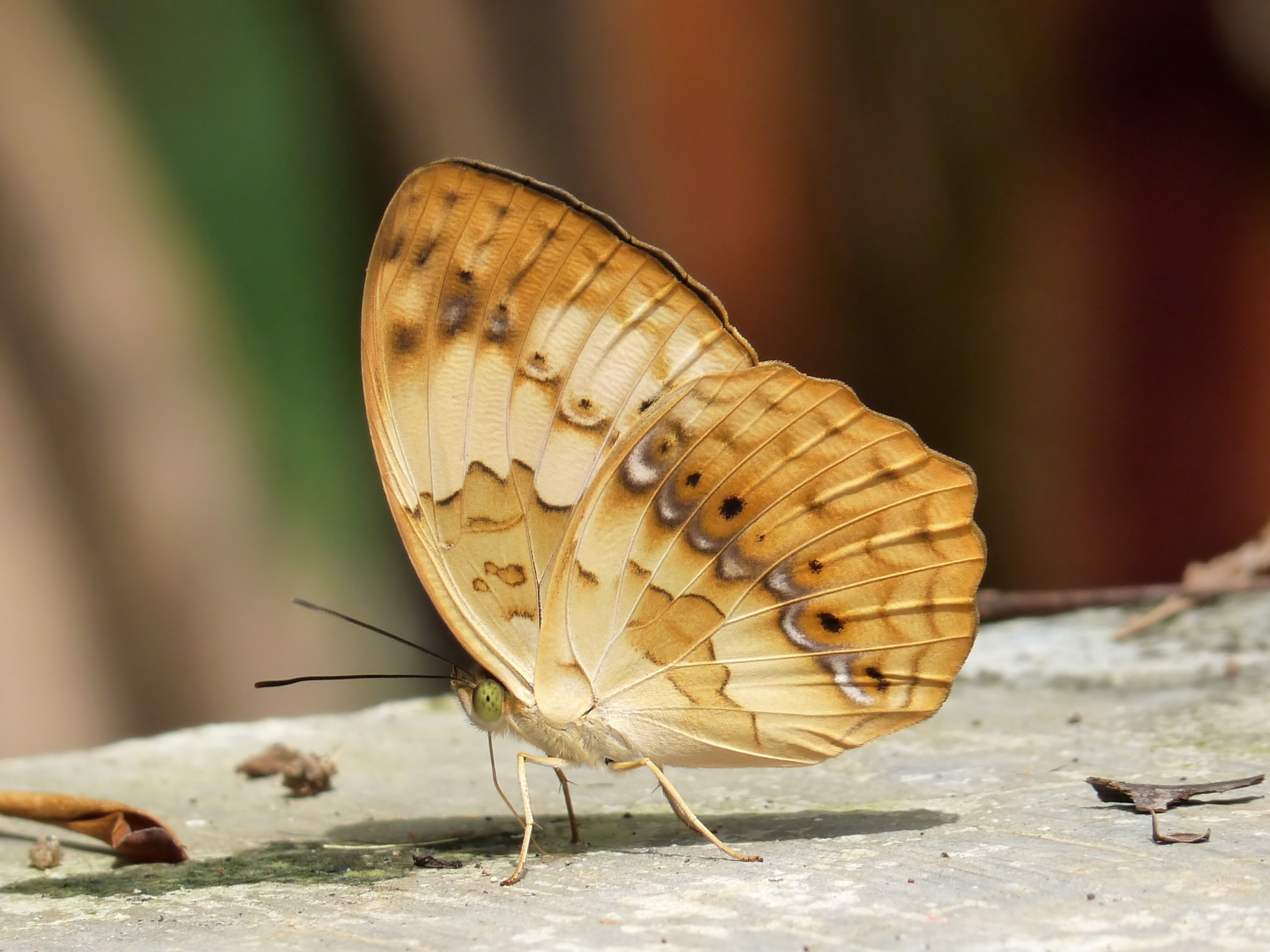
- C. e. maya, Kerala, India

Scientific classification
- Kingdom: Animalia
- Phylum: Arthropoda
- Clade: Pancrustacea
- Class: Insecta
- Order: Lepidoptera
- Family: Nymphalidae
- Genus: Cupha
- Species: C. erymanthis

Binomial name
- Cupha erymanthis (Drury, 1773)

Synonyms
- Cupha placida

= Cupha erymanthis =

Rustic

Species of butterfly

Cupha erymanthis, the rustic, is a species of brush-footed butterfly found in forested areas of tropical South Asia and Southeast Asia. The males and females are identical.

== Description ==
=== Upperside ===
The upperside of the rustic is ochraceous light brown. Its forewing displays some loop-like, slender, dark cellular markings with a broad, somewhat curved, transverse yellow discal band from costa to vein 1. The band does not reach the termen but broadens posteriorly.

The margins of the forewing are irregularly sinuous, with the inner defined broadly with black, and produced outwards in interspaces 3 and 4. Below this, the margin is squarely indented inwards in interspace 2 and outwardly convex in interspace 1. There is a curved series of three black spots. The largest is in interspaces 1, 2 and 3. The apical area beyond the band is black, with a conspicuous yellow subapical spot in interspace 5, and a paler ill-defined similar spot above it in interspace 6. In the posterior, the black area is produced narrowly to the tornus and encircles a yellow spot near the apex of interspace 2.

The hindwing features a transverse sinuous and very slender black line. This line is followed by a slender and somewhat lunular line; a transverse discal series of five black spots in interspaces 2 to 6; a postdiscal medially disjointed series or broad black lunules; a subterminal series of similar but straighter lunges; and a narrow terminal black band. The outer subbasal transverse line broadens at the costa, and is outwardly margined by pale spots in the interspaces. These are anteriorly white and well defined, and posteriorly obscure or often absent.

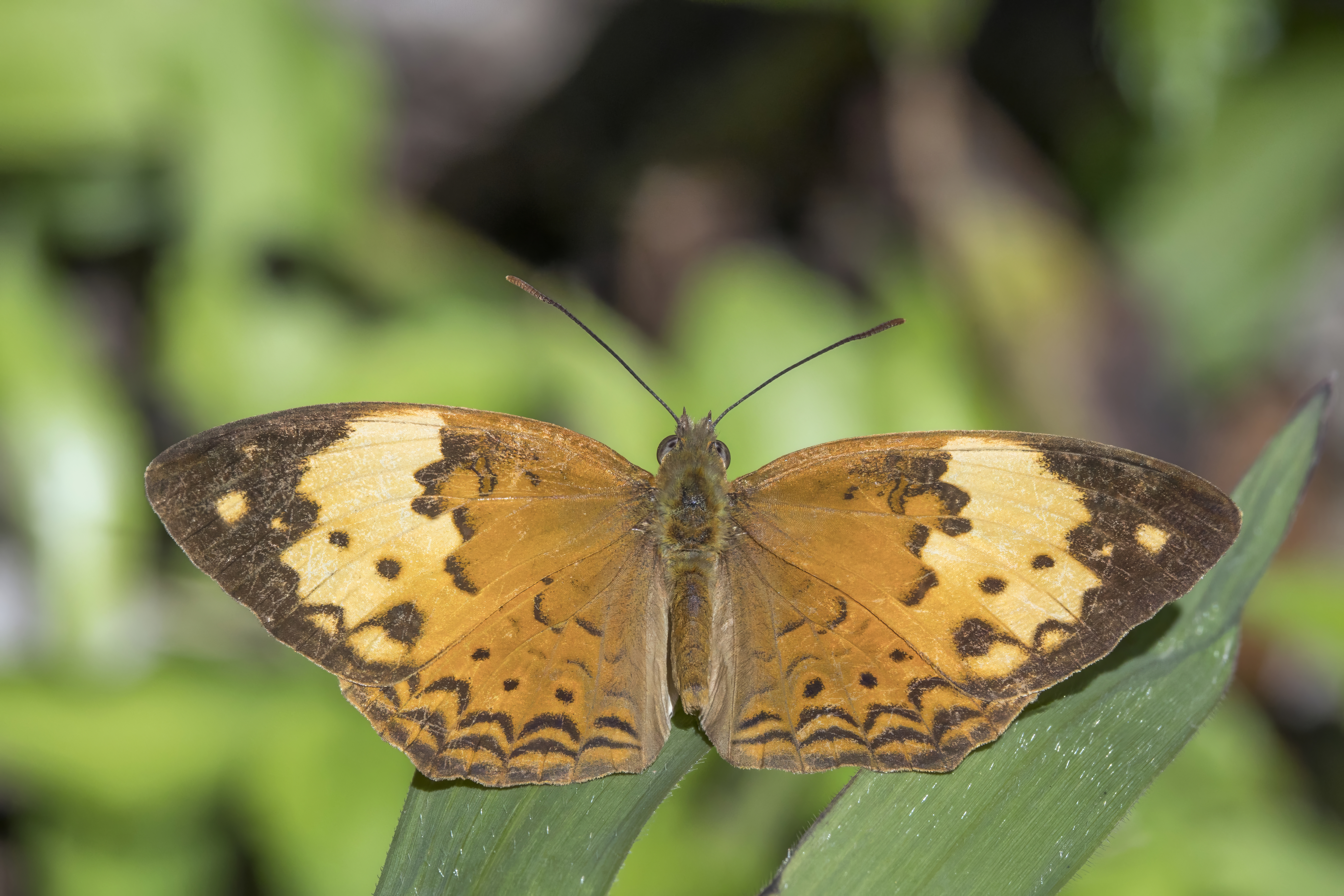
C. e. erymanthis, Taiwan

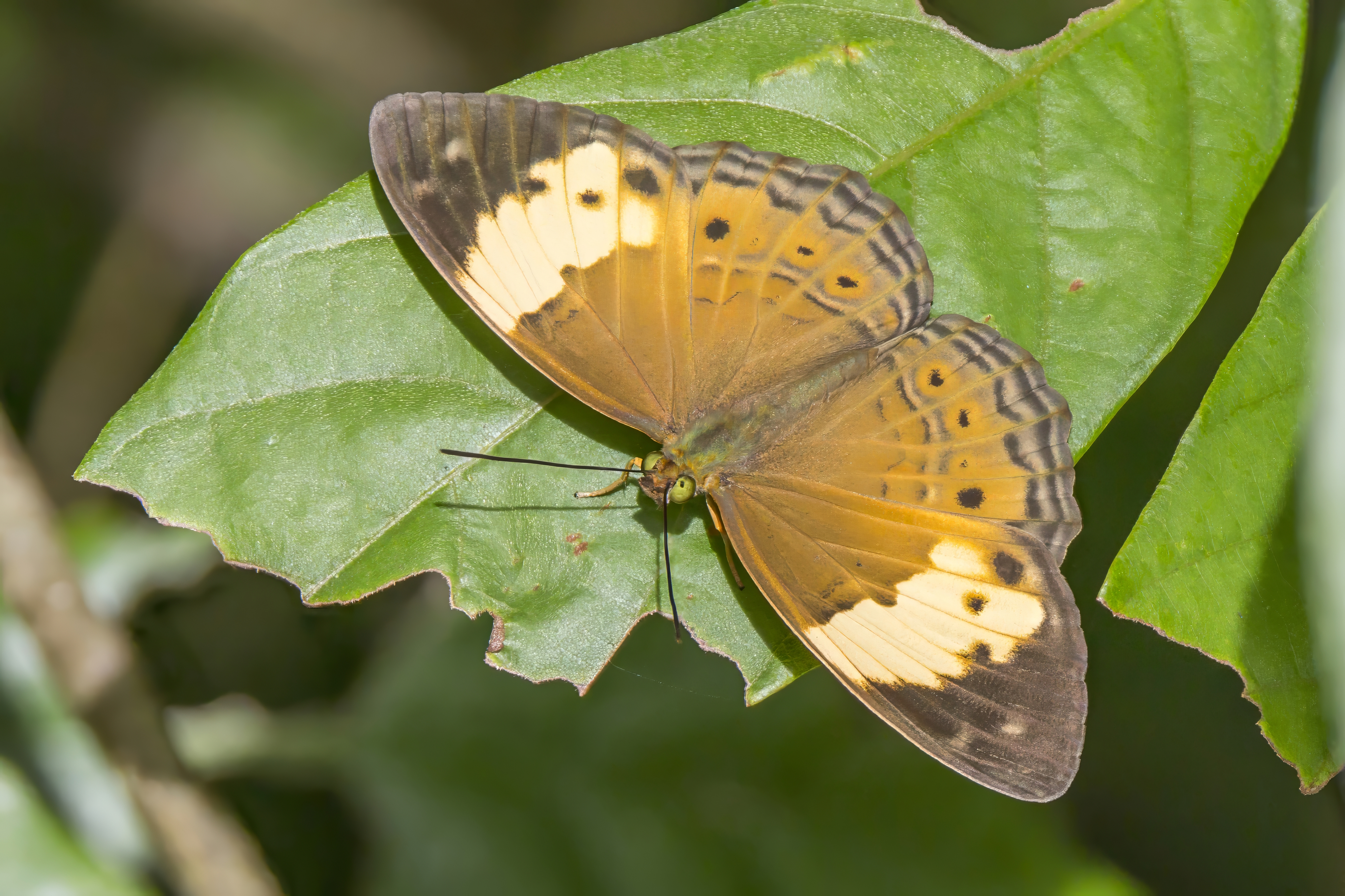
C. e. boholicus, Bohol, the Philippines

=== Underside ===
The underside of the wing is much paler. The discal band on the forewing is pale, and the black lunules on the apical area are replaced by pale brownish ochre. There are some obscure markings in the cells of both the forewings and hindwings.

Markings on the forewing include a discal, transverse, slender, chestnut-brown lunular line, bent inwards above vein 5, and bordered outwardly by a series of dark spots. The large black spot in interspace 1 is the same as that on the upperside. There are inner and outer transverse subterminal series of small dentate spots.

On the hindwing are indistinct cellular markings. The outer subbasal dark transverse line is similar to that on the upperside, but is more clearly defined and very sinuous. There is a transverse discal series of uneven lunules, paler than the ground colour, followed by a series of dark spots. There is a postdiscal very obscure pale lunular band, and a subterminal series of dentate dark spots, often obscure or obsolescent.

The antennae, head, thorax and abdomen are ochraceous brown. Beneath, the palpi, thorax, and abdomen are a very pale ochraceous white.

The caterpillar is brown, with a dorsal and lateral series of darker brown markings. The head has two slender branched spines. Succeeding segments on either side feature a lateral series of semitransparent similar brown spines.

The pupa is green, studded with eight slender pink filaments and four small pink tubercles.

=== Subspecies ===
- Cupha erymanthis erymanthis - China, Hong Kong, Taiwan
- Cupha erymanthis placida Moore, [1881] - Sri Lanka
- Cupha erymanthis maja, Fruhstorfer (1898) – south India
- Cupha erymanthis lotis, Sulzer (1776) – northeast India, Thailand, Malaya, Singapore, Indochina
- Cupha erymanthis andamanica, Moore (1900) – Andamans
- Cupha erymanthis nicobarica, Felder (1862) – Nicobar Is.

== Ecology ==
The rustic caterpillars feed mainly on Flacourtiaceae species, for example Flacourtia montana, F. ramontchii, F. rukam, Xylosma racemosa and Scolopia species. They also eat plants such as Glochidion eriocarpum and Lepisanthes rubiginosum.

Adult butterflies occasionally visit carrion to drink the fluids. They seem to favour carcasses lying in exposed, sunny areas over those which are in the shade.

== Larval Host Plants ==
- Glochidion eriocarpum
- Flacourtia
- Flacourtia indica
- Flacourtia jangomas
- Flacourtia montana

== Life history ==
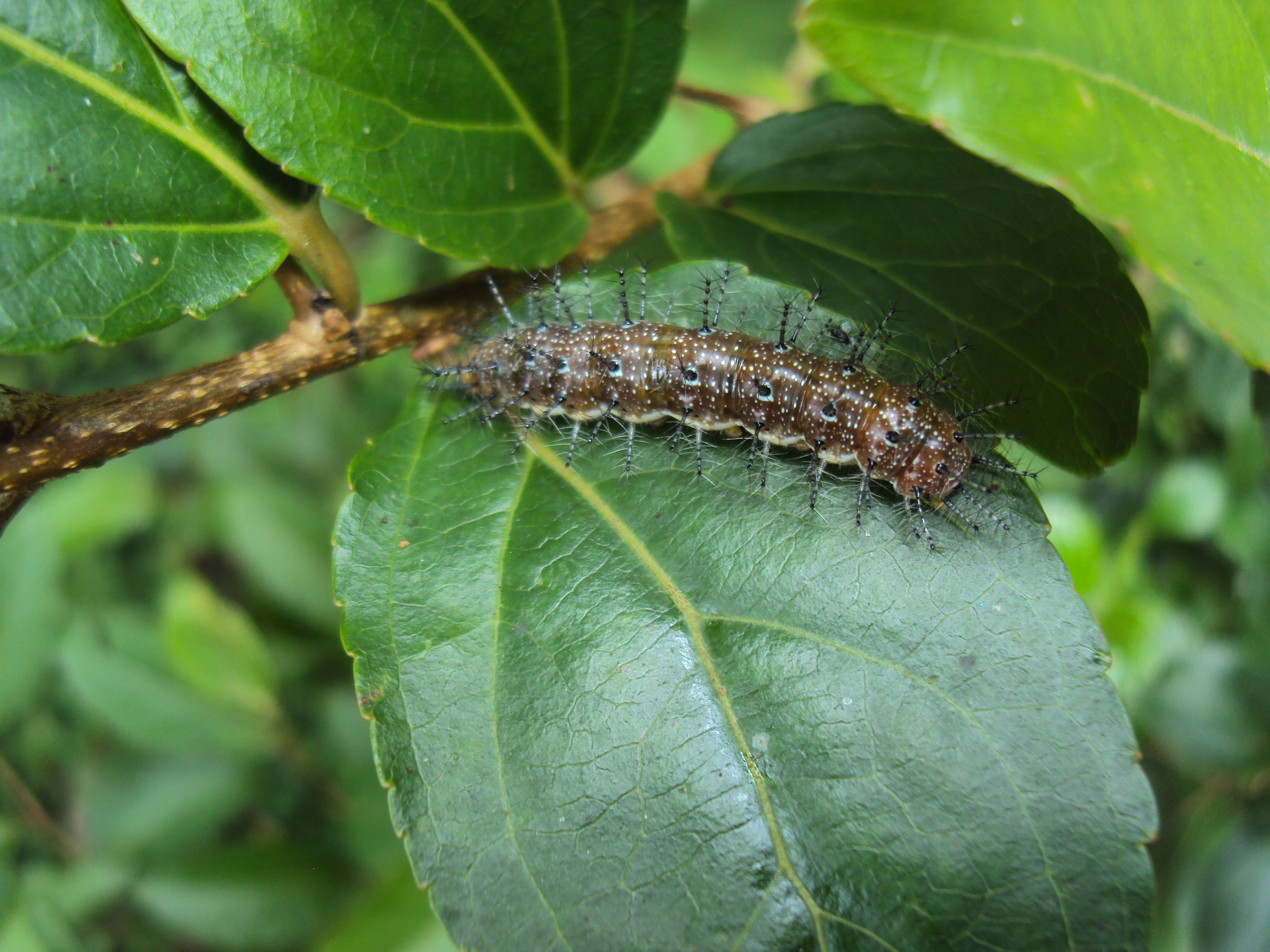
Caterpillar

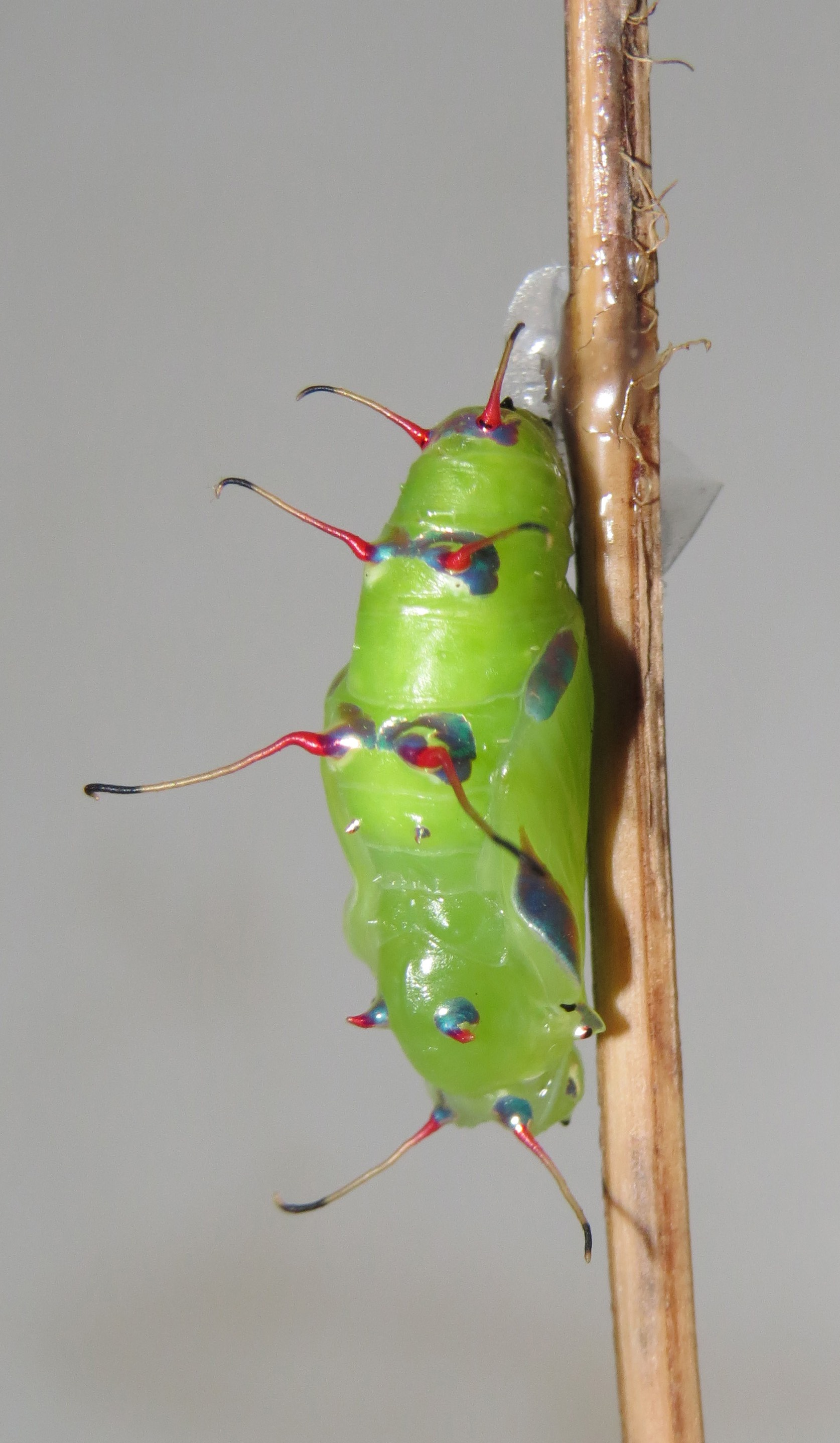
Pupa

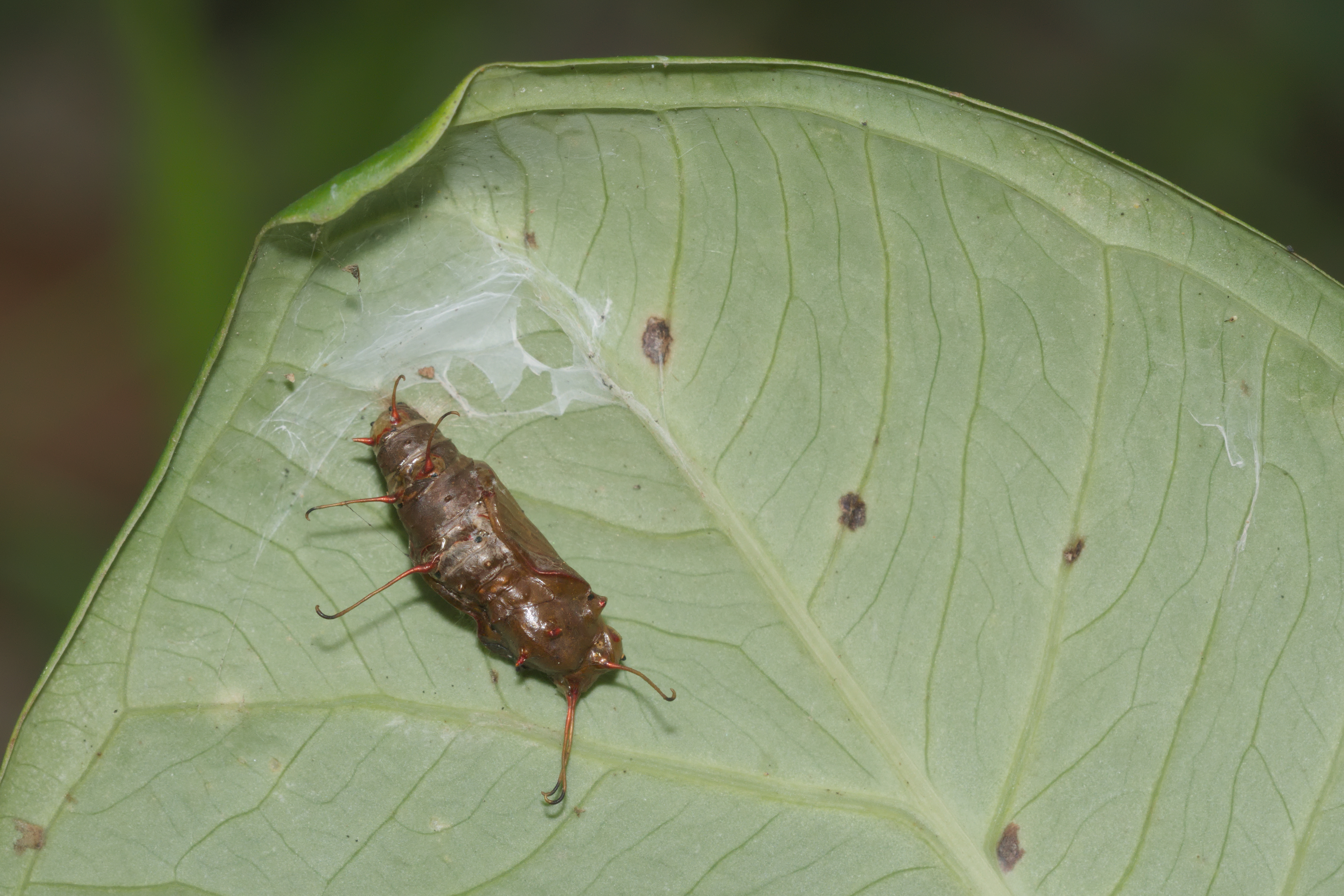
Pupa (matured)

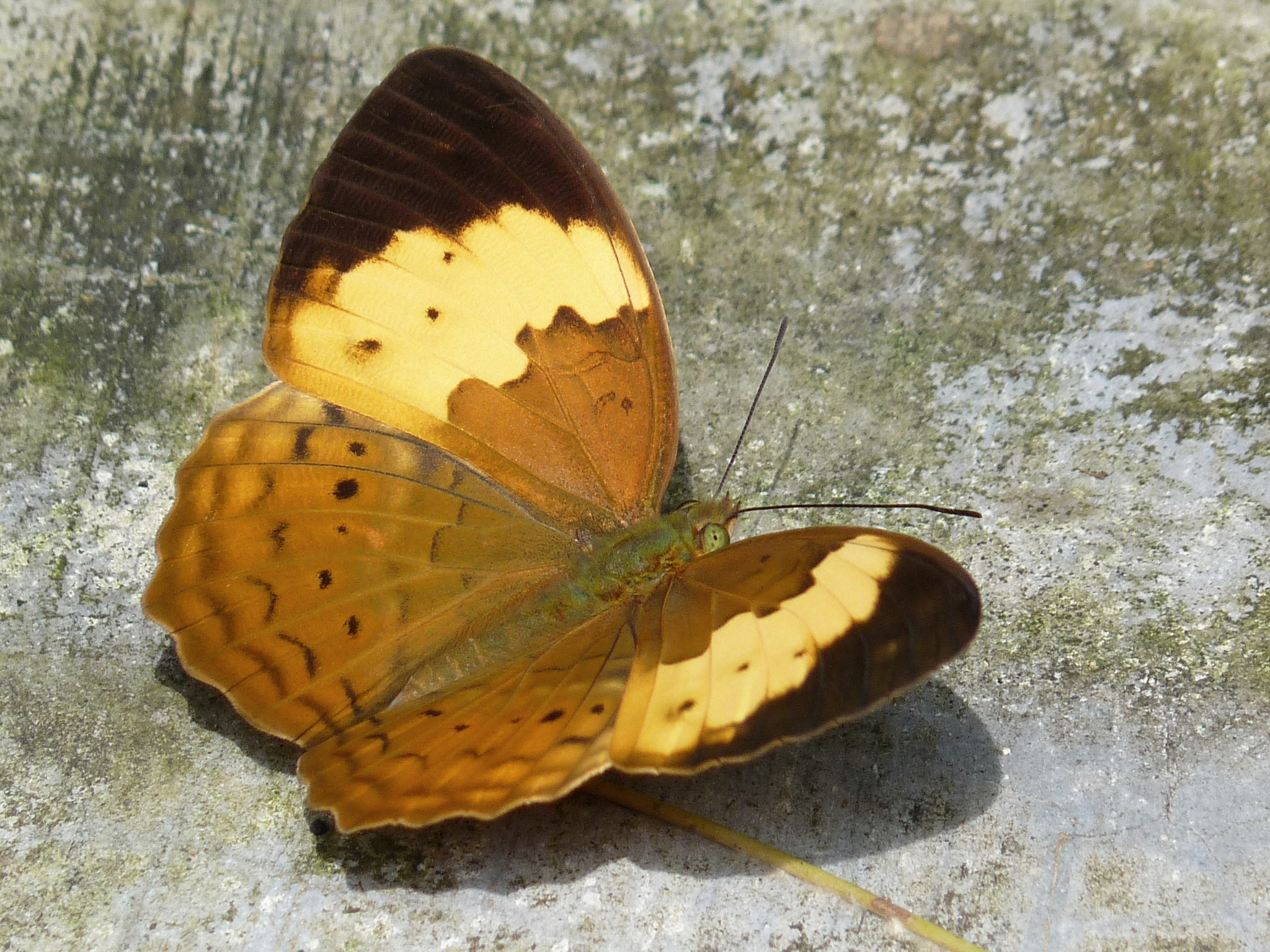
C. e. maya, Kerala, India

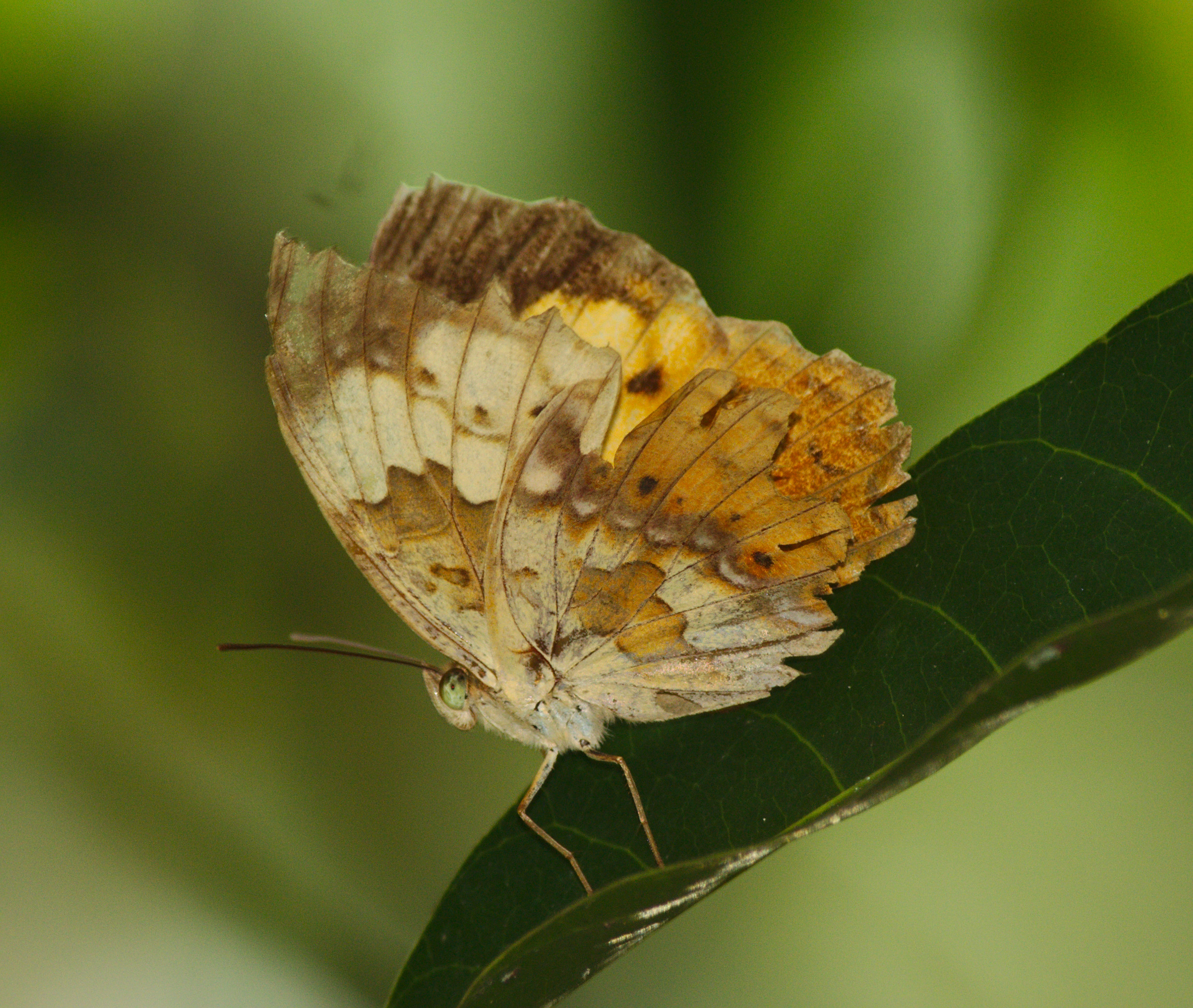
