= Tropical apricot (disambiguation) =

Tropical apricot is a fruit and the plant that produces it, a hybrid between Dovyalis hebecarpa and D. abyssinica. It can also refer to other plants:

- Mammea americana
- Myrciaria glomerata, endemic to Brazil
