= Tropical apricot =

Scientific classification
- Kingdom: Plantae
- Clade: Tracheophytes
- Clade: Angiosperms
- Clade: Eudicots
- Clade: Rosids
- Order: Malpighiales
- Family: Salicaceae
- Tribe: Saliceae
- Genus: Dovyalis
- Species: D. hebecarpa × D. abyssinica

The tropical apricot or ketcot is a hybrid thorny shrub cultivated for its fruit. It arose naturally in Florida, and in 1953 selected plants were propagated.
