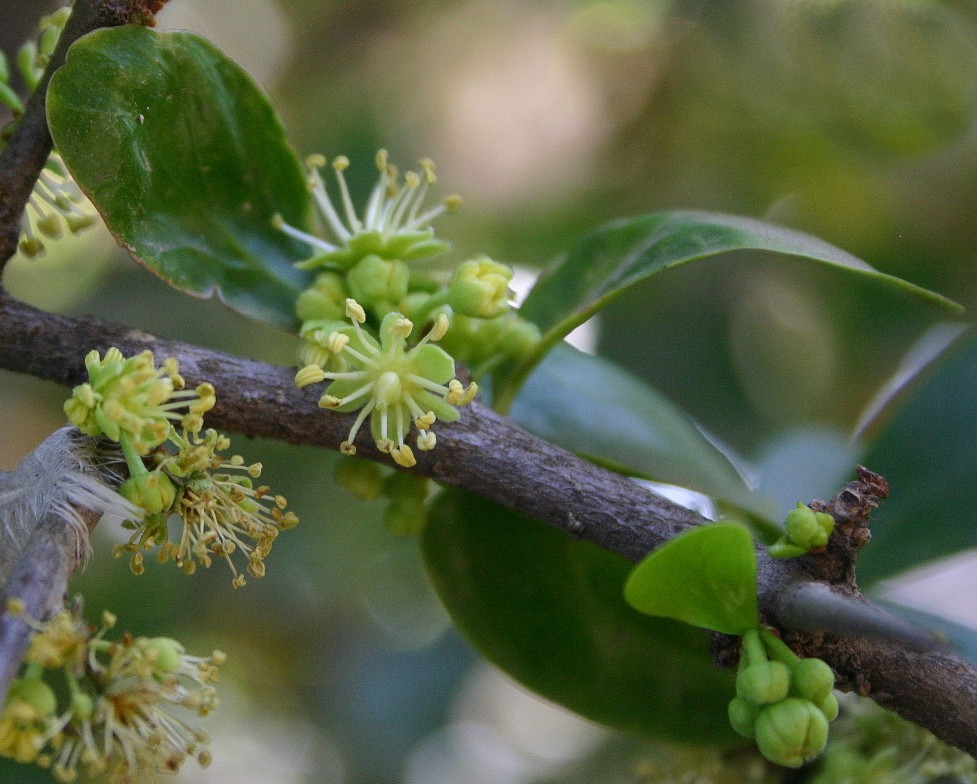
- Dovyalis caffra

Scientific classification
- Kingdom: Plantae
- Clade: Embryophytes
- Clade: Tracheophytes
- Clade: Angiosperms
- Clade: Eudicots
- Clade: Rosids
- Order: Malpighiales
- Family: Salicaceae
- Subfamily: Salicoideae
- Tribe: Saliceae
- Genus: Dovyalis; E.Mey. ex Arn.

Species
- See text

Synonyms
- Aberia Hochst.; Ateleste Sond.

= Dovyalis =

Genus of flowering plants

Dovyalis is a genus of plants in the family Salicaceae that is native to Africa and Sri Lanka. It includes 19 species, some of which are cultivated for their fruit.

== Description ==
Species of the genus Dovyalis are dense, thorny plants growing to 3–6 m tall, with sharp, 3–6 cm long stem spines in the leaf axils. Buds at the base of the spine produce clusters of alternately arranged simple ovate leaves 3–10 cm long.

The flowers are inconspicuous, solitary or clustered, with no petals. They are dioecious, with male and female flowers on separate plants. The fruit is an edible, yellow to purple globose berry 2–4 cm diameter, containing several small seeds. They are very juicy and with an acidic flavour.

== Taxonomy ==
The genus was erected in 1841 by Scottish botanist George Arnott Walker Arnott in Journal of botany :being a second series of the Botanical miscellany. Arnott attributed the authorship of the genus to German botanist Ernst Heinrich Friedrich Meyer. It was initially placed in the family Flacourtiaceae, but moved to Salicaceae in 2002.

== Species ==
As of August 2026, Plants of the World Online recognises 19 species in the genus:

- Dovyalis abyssinica (A.Rich.) Warb.
- Dovyalis afra (Hook.f. & Harv.) Warb. (emended)
- Dovyalis cameroonensis Cheek & Ngolan
- Dovyalis hebecarpa (Gardner) Warb.
- Dovyalis hispidula Wild
- Dovyalis keniensis E.V.Williams
- Dovyalis longispina (Harv.) Warb.
- Dovyalis lucida Sim
- Dovyalis macrocalyx (Oliv.) Warb.
- Dovyalis macrocarpa Bamps
- Dovyalis mollis (Oliv.) Warb.
- Dovyalis revoluta Thom
- Dovyalis rhamnoides (Burch. ex DC.) Burch. ex Harv. & Sond.
- Dovyalis rotundifolia (Thunb.) Harv.
- Dovyalis spinosissima Gilg
- Dovyalis verrucosa (Hochst.) Lign. & Bey
- Dovyalis xanthocarpa Bullock
- Dovyalis zenkeri Gilg
- Dovyalis zeyheri (Sond.) Warb.

== Distribution ==
It is native to the following regions as defined in the World Geographical Scheme for Recording Plant Distributions:

- East Tropical Africa – Kenya, Tanzania, Uganda
- Northeast Tropical Africa – Ethiopia, Socotra, Somalia, Sudan
- South Tropical Africa – Angola, Malawi, Mozambique, Zambia, Zimbabwe
- Southern Africa – Cape Provinces, KwaZulu-Natal, Northern Provinces, Swaziland
- West Tropical Africa – Benin, Ghana, Guinea, Guinea-Bissau, Ivory Coast, Liberia, Nigeria, Sierra Leone
- West-Central Tropical Africa – Burundi, Cabinda, Cameroon, Central African Republic, Congo, Equatorial Guinea, Gabon, Rwanda, Zaire
- Indian Subcontinent – Sri Lanka

== Cultivation and uses ==
Several species are grown for their fruit; D. afra (Umkokola or Kei-apple) is popular in southern Africa, and D. hebecarpa (Kitembilla) in India and Sri Lanka. Some, notably D. abyssinica, are also grown as ornamental plants and as hedges, where the spines are valued for deterring intrusion by livestock or burglars.

The tropical apricot, or ketcot, is a hybrid between D. hebecarpa and D. abyssinica that was developed in Florida in 1953 and is cultivated for its fruit.
