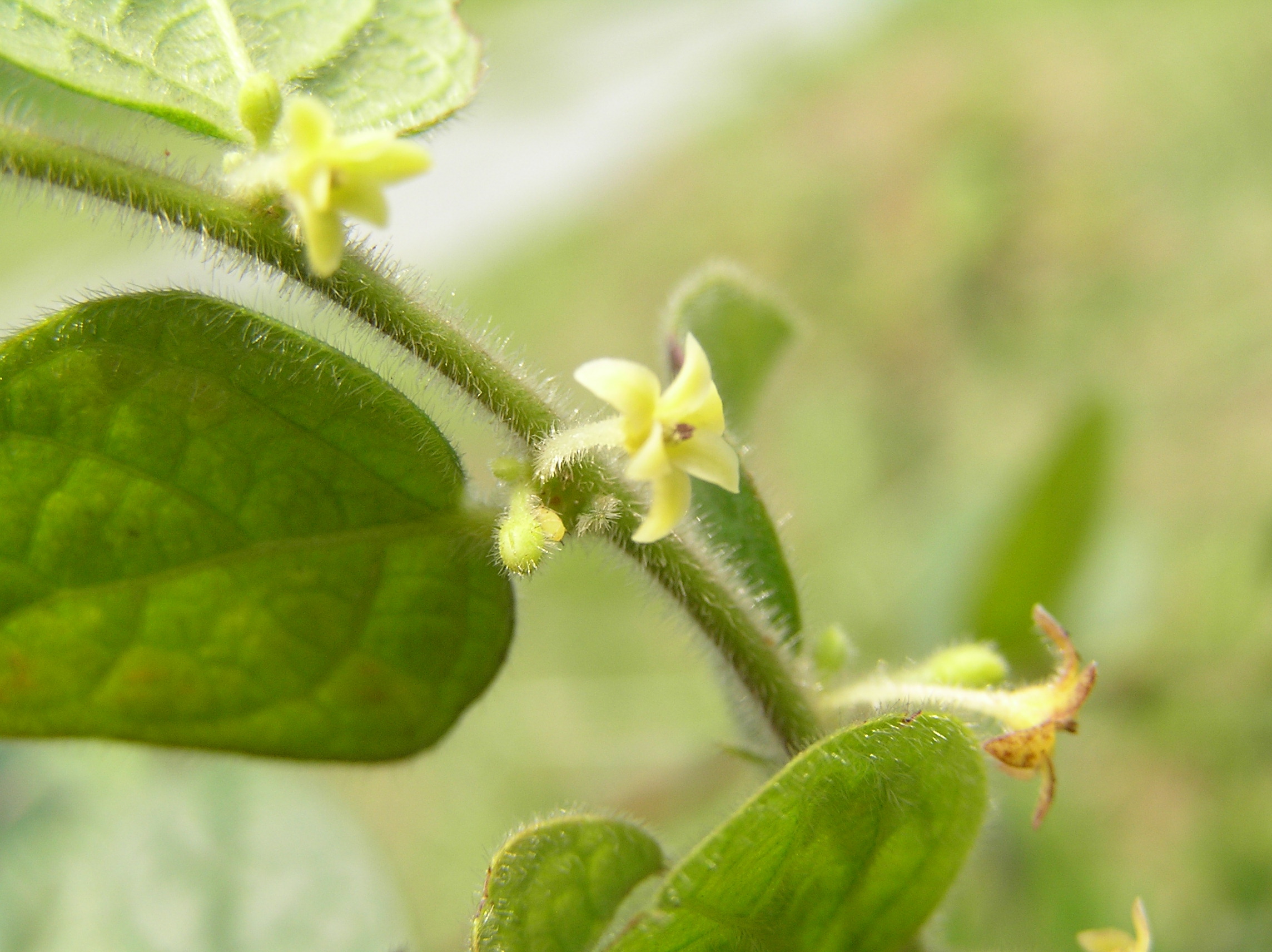
- Phyllanthus eriocarpus

Conservation status
- Least Concern (IUCN 3.1)

Scientific classification
- Kingdom: Plantae
- Clade: Embryophytes
- Clade: Tracheophytes
- Clade: Spermatophytes
- Clade: Angiosperms
- Clade: Eudicots
- Clade: Rosids
- Order: Malpighiales
- Family: Phyllanthaceae
- Genus: Phyllanthus
- Species: P. eriocarpus

Binomial name
- Phyllanthus eriocarpus (Champ. ex Benth.) Müll.Arg.

Synonyms
- Diasperus eriocarpus (Champ. ex Benth.) Kuntze; Diasperus villicaulis (Hook.f.) Kuntze; Glochidion eriocarpum Champ. ex Benth.; Glochidion esquirolii H.Lév.; Glochidion villicaule Hook.f.

= Phyllanthus eriocarpus =

Species of flowering plant

Phyllanthus eriocarpus is a species of flowering plant in the family Phyllanthaceae. It is native to portions of Southeast Asia and southern China, including Myanmar, Thailand, Vietnam, Thailand, Hainan, Peninsular Malaysia, northern Sumatra, and Sulawesi. It's a bush or tree that mainly thrives in the damp tropical environment at elevations ranging from 100 to 1700 meters above sea level.

== Appearance ==
It's a bush or tree that can grow up to 4–8 meters. The flowers grow either individually in the axils of the leaves or in clusters of 2–4.

== Uses ==
The plant is gathered from its natural habitat to be used locally for medicinal purposes, mainly for skin diseases such as urticaria or eczema.
