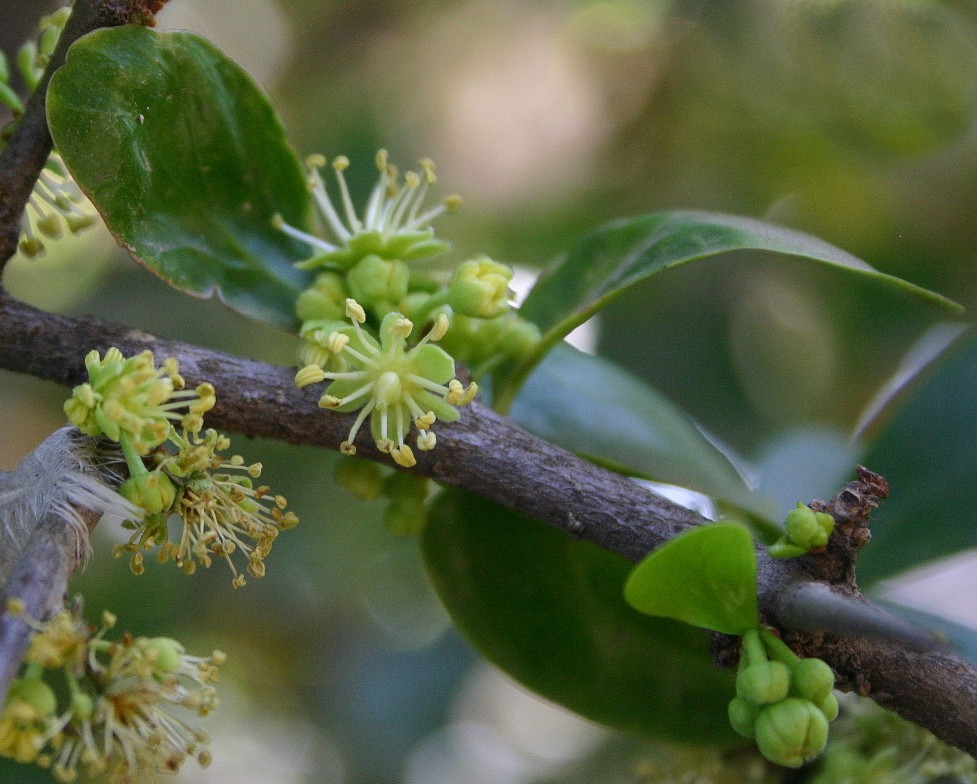
- Dovyalis caffra flowers

Conservation status
- Least Concern (IUCN 3.1)

Scientific classification
- Kingdom: Plantae
- Clade: Embryophytes
- Clade: Tracheophytes
- Clade: Angiosperms
- Clade: Eudicots
- Clade: Rosids
- Order: Malpighiales
- Family: Salicaceae
- Genus: Dovyalis
- Species: D. caffra

Binomial name
- Dovyalis caffra (Hook.f. & Harv.) Warb. (emended)

Synonyms
- Aberia afra Hook.f. & Harv.; Aberia edulis T.Anderson; Dovyalis caffra

= Kei apple =

Species of tree

Dovyalis caffra, (Note: Until recently D. caffra) commonly known as the Kei apple, is a small to medium-sized tree, native to southern Africa. Its distribution extends from the Kei River in the south, from which the common name derives, northwards along the eastern side of the continent to Tanzania. The ripe fruits (which are present from December to January) are edible and similar in appearance to apricots, though they are quite acidic due to having a high concentration of malic acid.

It is a usually found in dry types of woodland when it grows to 6 m tall. In moister types of open woodland it reaches its greatest size of about 8–9 metres. A tree, with sharp, 3–6 cm long stem spines in the leaf axils, and large sturdy thorns. Buds at the base of the spine produce clusters of alternately arranged simple ovate leaves 3–6 cm long.

The flowers are inconspicuous, solitary or clustered, with no petals. It is dioecious, with male and female flowers on separate plants, though some female plants are parthenogenetic.

The fruit is an edible bright yellow or orange globose berry 2.5–4 cm diameter, with the skin and flesh of a uniform colour and containing several small seeds. Production is often copious, weighing down the branches during the summer. They are juicy and very acidic.

== Cultivation and uses ==
A traditional food plant in the areas it occurs, this little-known fruit is considered by local efforts to improve nutrition, boost food security, foster rural development and support sustainable landcare.

Kei-apples are often eaten fresh or sprinkled with sugar to complement their natural acidity. Aside from being eaten fresh, the fruit can be made into jam, used in desserts, or pickled (their natural acidity means vinegar is not needed). In Kenya, it is mostly used for live fences and hedges.

Although it is native to southern Africa, it has also been introduced to the Mediterranean, California, Florida, and other regions with subtropical and warm temperate climates. In these places it is most often grown as an ornamental plant, being popular as an impenetrable hedge. It is salt and drought-tolerant, so useful for coastal landscaping in dry regions.

Although a subtropical species, the Kei apple is able to survive temperatures as low as −6 °C (21 °F). Gardeners who want fruit require a female plant; a fertile female plant and a fertile male plant is ideal. Kei apples are propagated by seed. Plants will bear about four years later.

== Taxonomy ==
The original species name caffra is related to kaffir, an ethnic slur used towards black people in Africa. At the July 2024 International Botanical Congress, a vote was held with the result that "caffra" related names will be emended to afra related ones, with the implementation of this happening by the end of July 2024.

== Ecology ==
The species is invasive in New Caledonia.

== Gallery ==
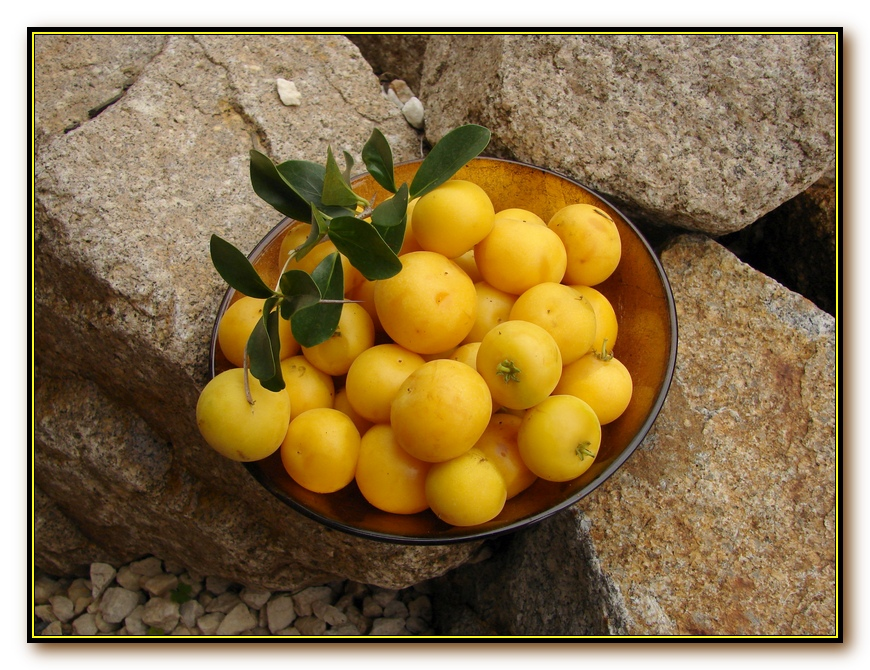
Ripe fruit

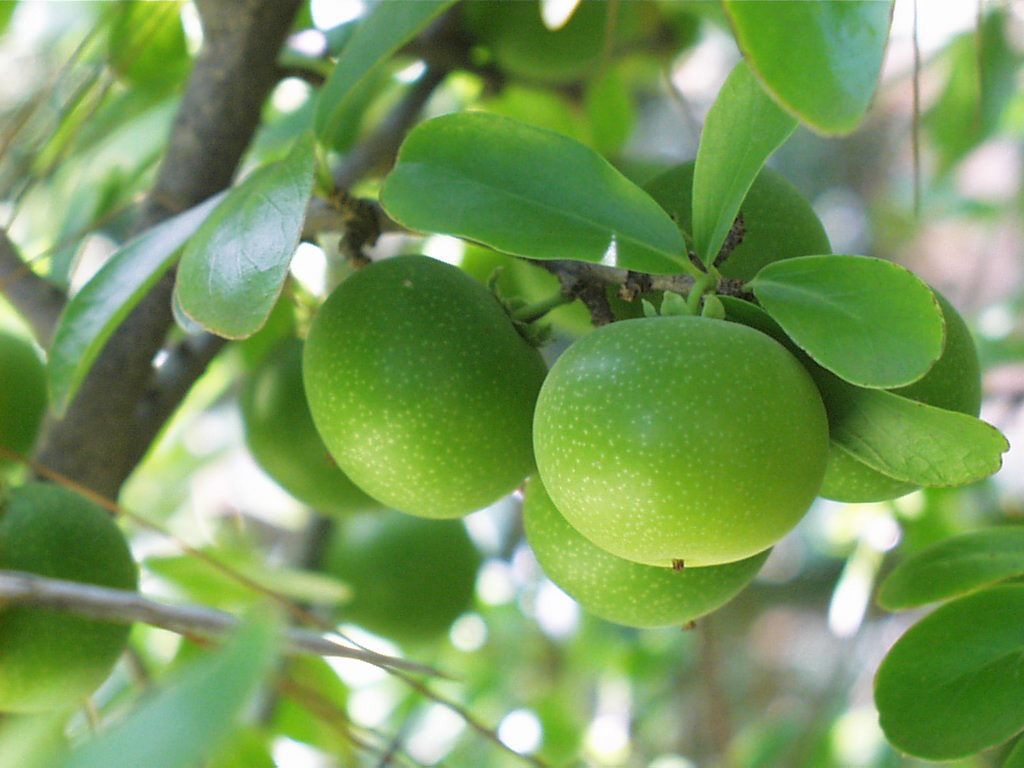
Unripe fruit

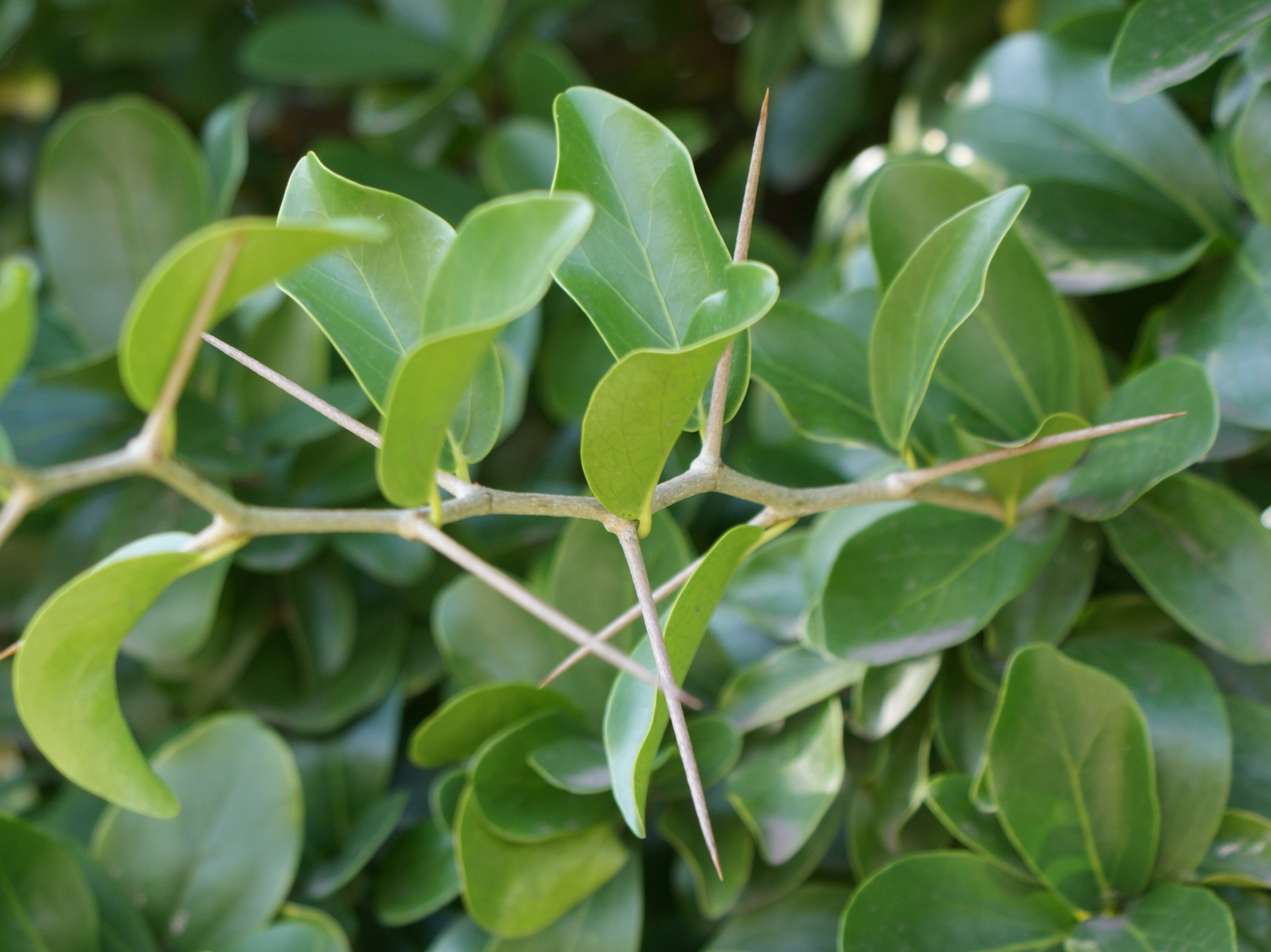
Thorns
