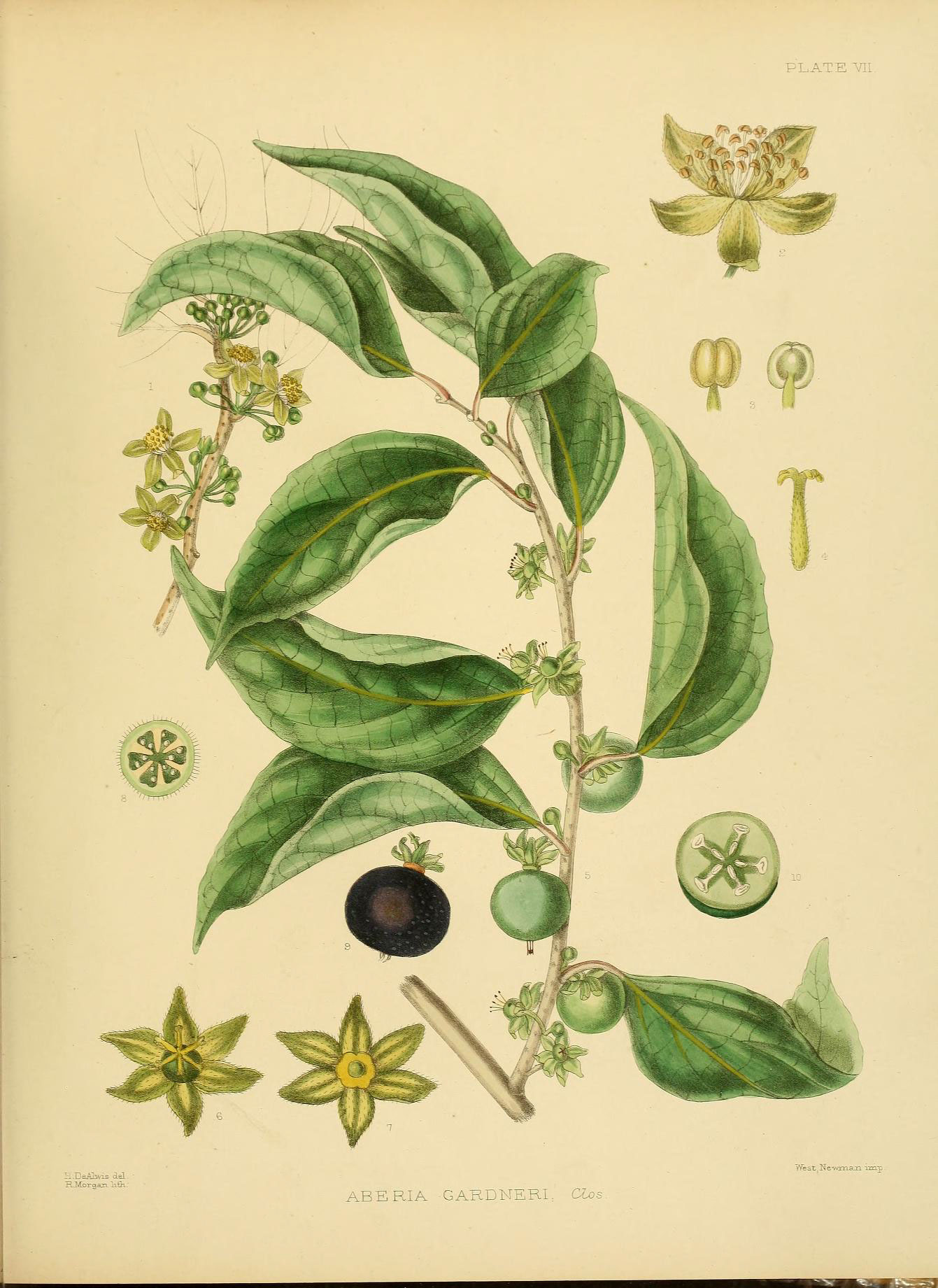

Scientific classification
- Kingdom: Plantae
- Clade: Tracheophytes
- Clade: Angiosperms
- Clade: Eudicots
- Clade: Rosids
- Order: Malpighiales
- Family: Salicaceae
- Genus: Dovyalis
- Species: D. hebecarpa

Binomial name
- Dovyalis hebecarpa (Gardner) Warb.

Synonyms
- Aberia gardneri Clos nom. illeg.; Aberia hebecarpa (Gardner) Kuntze; Rumea hebecarpa Gardner

= Dovyalis hebecarpa =

Species of flowering plant

Dovyalis hebecarpa, with common names Ceylon gooseberry, ketembilla, and kitambilla, is a plant in the genus Dovyalis, native to Sri Lanka and southern India. The fruit are often eaten fresh, or made into jam. Some cultivars have been selected for being thornless (making harvesting easier) and for larger fruit.

The tropical apricot, or ketcot, is a hybrid between D. hebecarpa and D. abyssinica that was developed in Florida in 1953 and is also cultivated for its fruit.

== Description ==
It is a shrub or small tree growing to 6 m tall, with sharp, 3–6 cm long stem spines in the leaf axils. The leaves are alternately arranged, simple broad lanceolate, 5–10 cm long and 1–3 cm broad, with an entire or finely toothed margin.

The flowers are inconspicuous, solitary (female flowers) or clustered (male flowers), with no petals. It is dioecious, with male and female flowers on separate plants, though some female plants are parthenogenetic.

The fruit is an edible dark purple globose berry 2–3 cm diameter, juicy with an acidic flavor, and containing several small seeds. The fruit is quite acidic, so it is usually not eaten fresh. Peeling the skin makes them less acidic and more palatable.

These plants can be propagated from seed as well as air layering. From seed the plants will take about 3 years to flower and if successfully pollinated can bear fruit. Air layered plants are tend to be less thorny than seed grown and also flower and produce sooner. Once established these plants are vigorous growing shrubs.

== Gallery ==
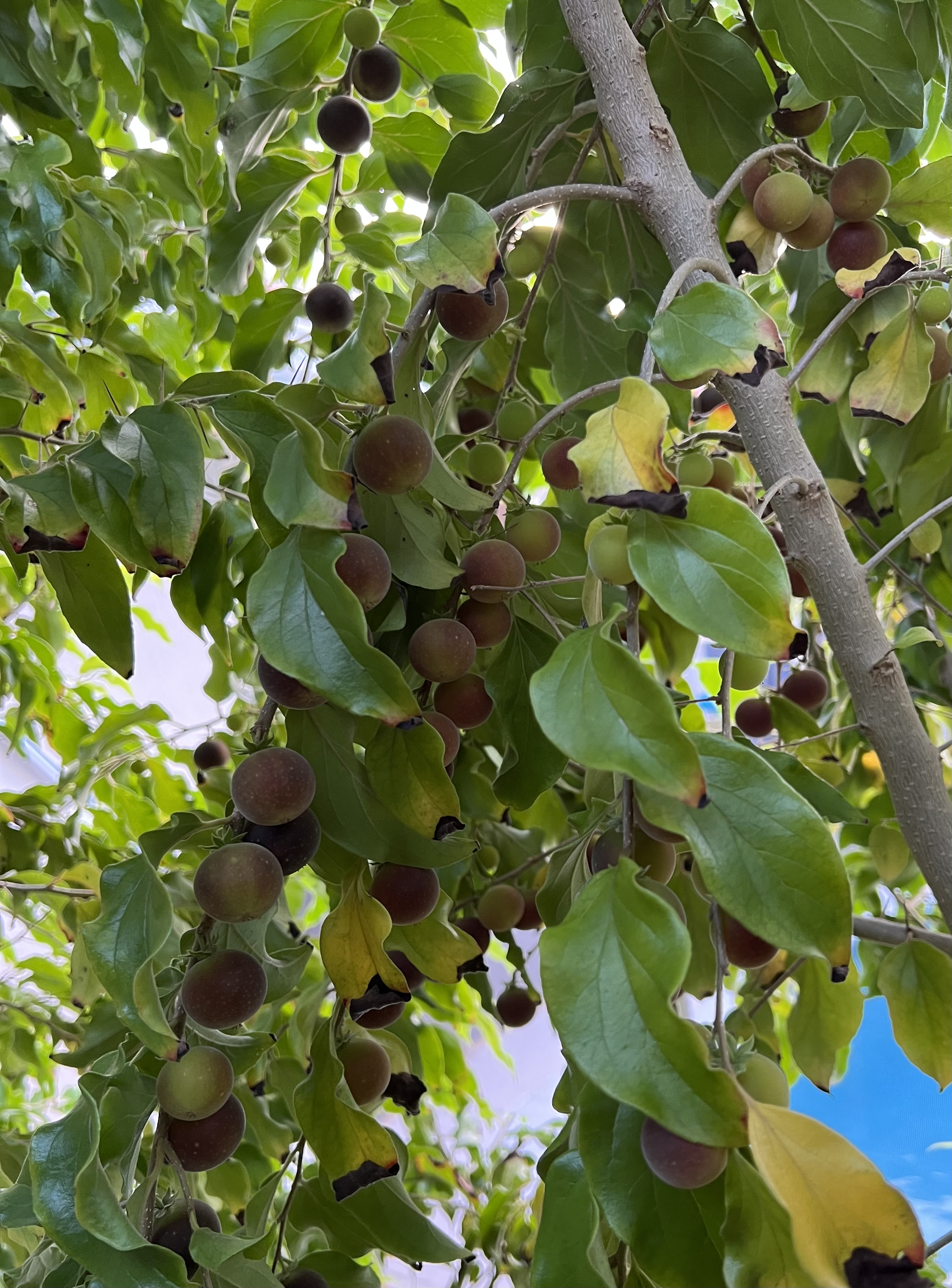
Ceylon gooseberries, Florida

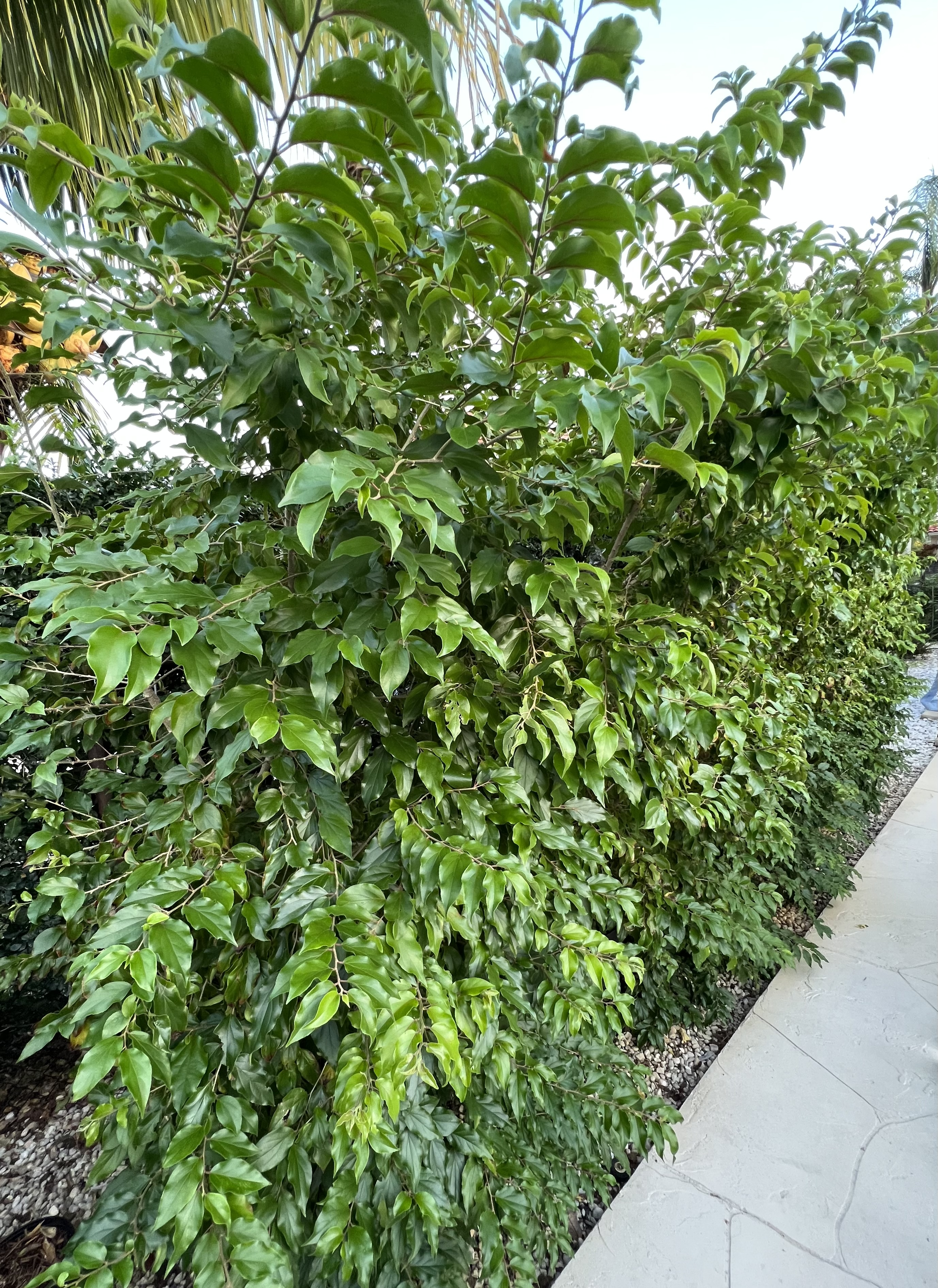
Ceylon gooseberry hedge, Florida

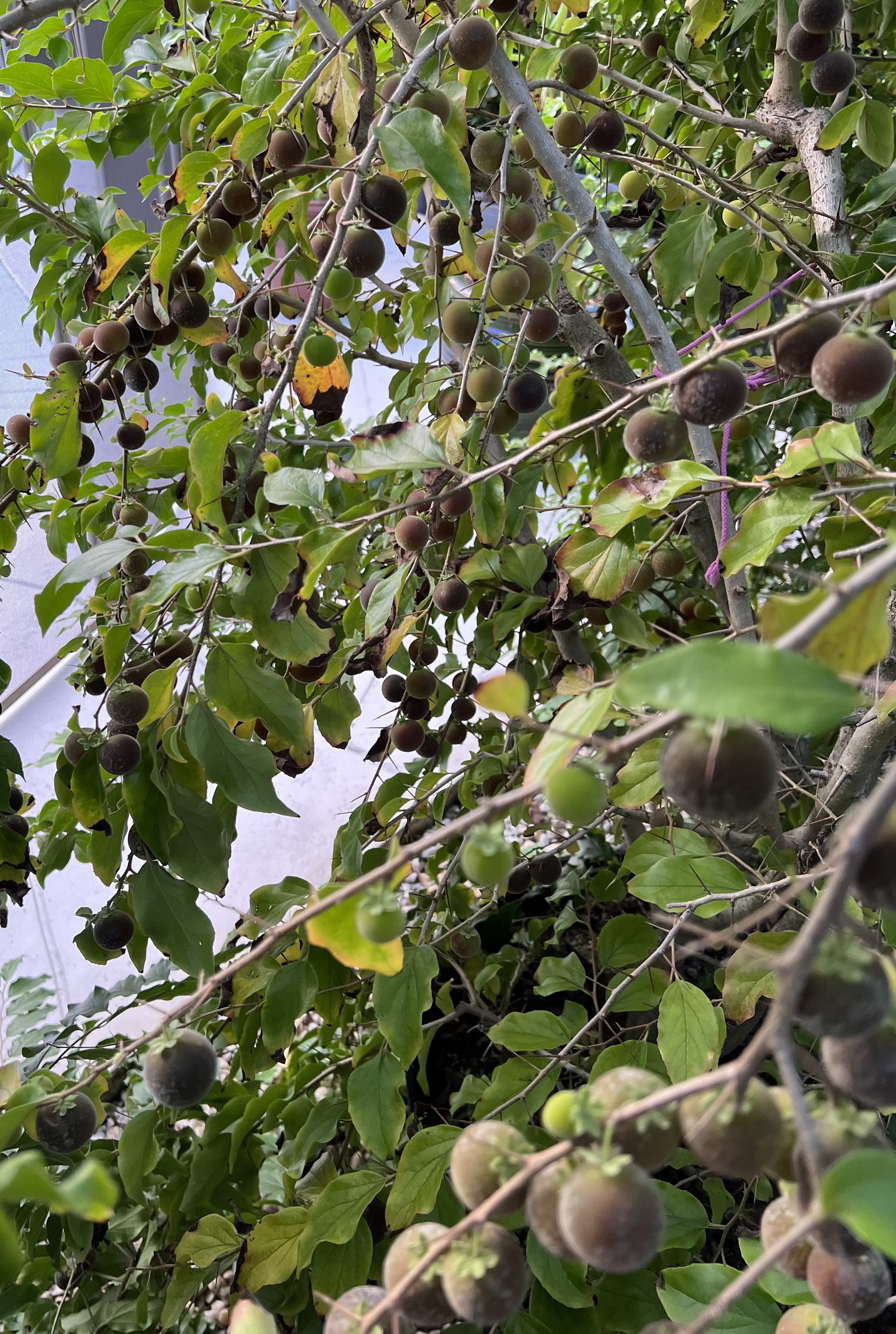
Ceylon gooseberries fruiting
