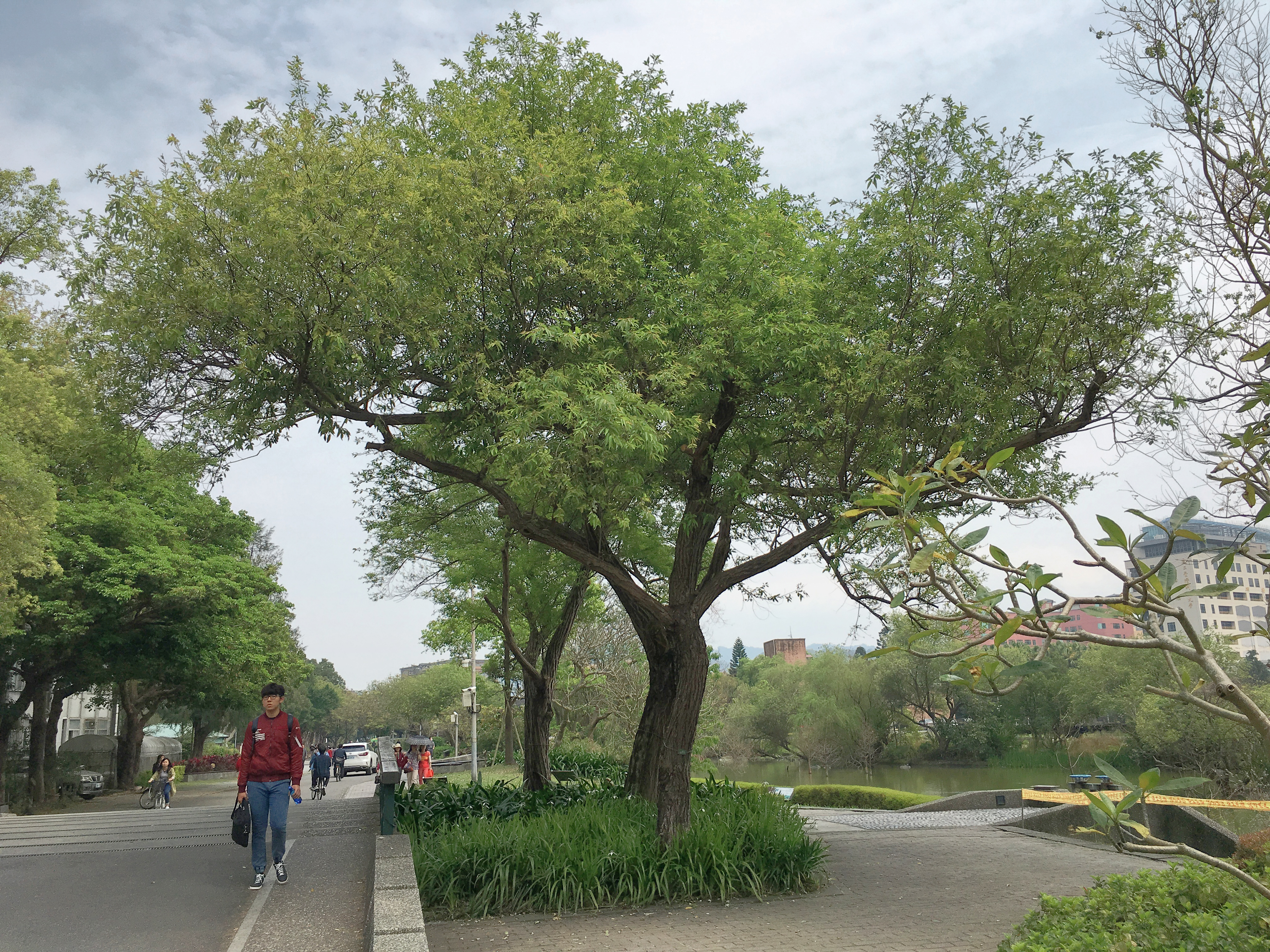
- Here given as Salix warburgii

Conservation status
- Least Concern (IUCN 3.1)

Scientific classification
- Kingdom: Plantae
- Clade: Embryophytes
- Clade: Tracheophytes
- Clade: Spermatophytes
- Clade: Angiosperms
- Clade: Eudicots
- Clade: Rosids
- Order: Malpighiales
- Family: Salicaceae
- Genus: Salix
- Species: S. mesnyi

Binomial name
- Salix mesnyi Hance

Synonyms
- List: Pleiarina angiolepis (H.Lév. & Vaniot) N.Chao & J.Liu; Pleiarina dictyoneura (Seemen) N.Chao & G.T.Gong; Pleiarina dunnii (C.K.Schneid.) N.Chao & G.T.Gong; Pleiarina mesnyi (Hance) N.Chao & G.T.Gong; Pleiarina neowilsonii (W.P.Fang) N.Chao & G.T.Gong; Pleiarina rosthornii (Seemen) N.Chao & J.Liu; Pleiarina tsoongii (Cheng) N.Chao & G.T.Gong; Pleiarina warburgii (Seemen) N.Chao & G.T.Gong; Salix angiolepis H.Lév. & Vaniot; Salix argyi H.Lév.; Salix changchowensis F.P.Metcalf; Salix chekiangensis Cheng; Salix dictyoneura Seemen; Salix dodecandra H.Lév. & Vaniot; Salix dunnii C.K.Schneid.; Salix dunnii var. tsoongii (Cheng) C.Y.Yu & S.D.Zhao; Salix glandulosa var. stenophylla C.Wang & C.Y.Yu; Salix nankingensis Z.Wang & S.L.Tung; Salix neowilsonii W.P.Fang; Salix rosthornii Seemen; Salix tsoongii Cheng; Salix warburgii Seemen; Salix wilsonii Seemen

= Salix mesnyi =

Species of flowering plant

Salix mesnyi is a species of willow native to southern and eastern China (Jiangxi, Zhejiang, Anhui, Jiangsu, Fujian, Guangdong, Guangxi), Taiwan, and Vietnam. It can be found among shrubs near water growing 15 metres (49 ft) tall.

== Description ==
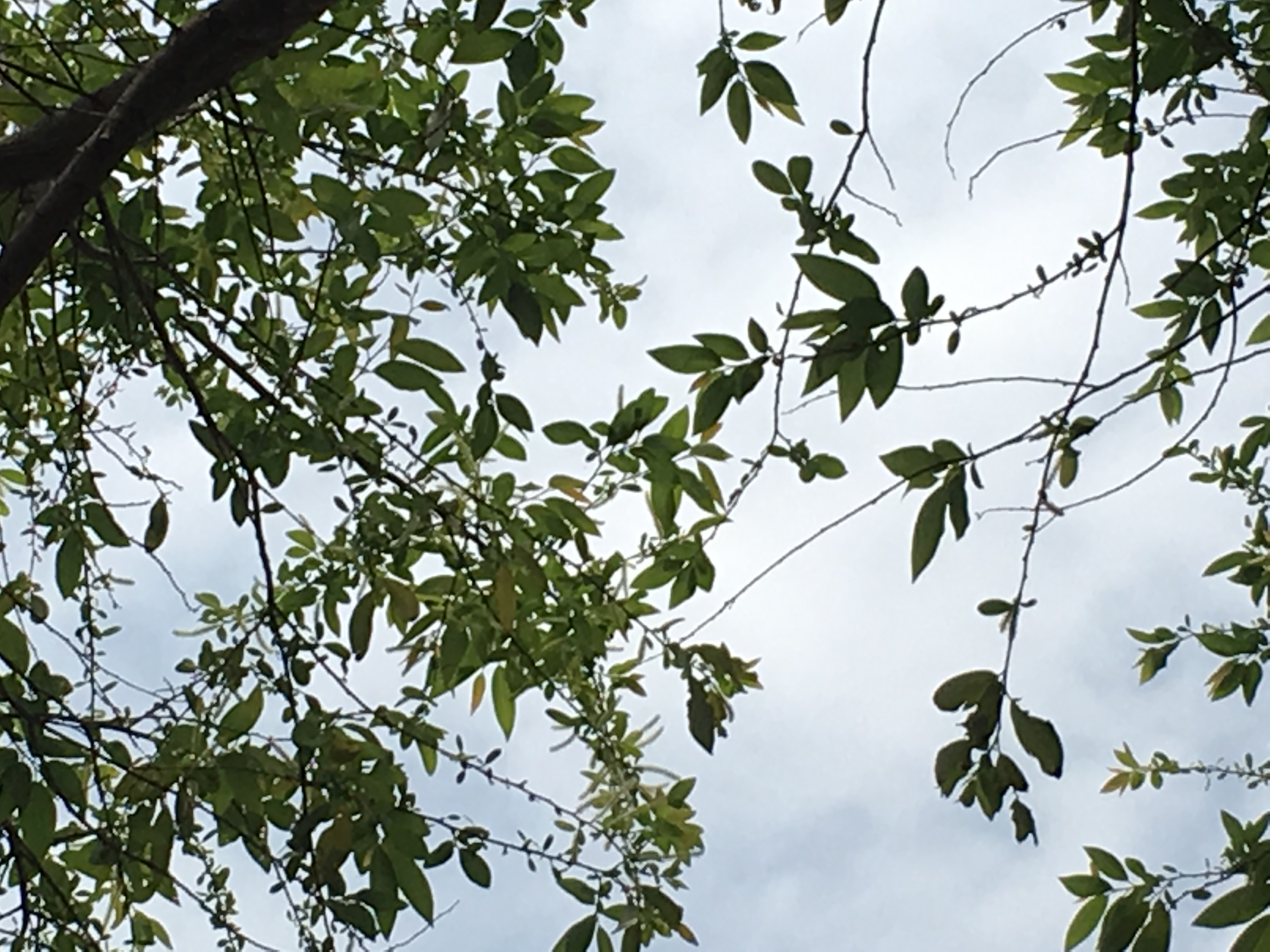

A relatively small deciduous tree, Salix mesnyi usually grows to a height between about 10–15 metres (33–49 ft). The bark is grey, and the leaves are ovate with serrated edges. The back of the leaves is also, like the bark, grey.

=== Flowers ===
Salix mesnyi is a dioecious plant. Blooming in early spring, female flowers are green and male flowers are yellow. The flowers are without petals, calyx, only stamens or pistils longer than calyx-like bracts. Male flowers, catkins, are about 4–8 cm (1.6–3.1 in), containing 4–7 stamens, anthers conspicuously yellow, filaments basally hairy, surrounded by yellow glands. While the female spike length of about 3–6 cm (1.2–2.4 in), with bracts long ovary stalk, spindle-shaped ovary which has 6–10 ovules, short style on the split 4 petals into a cross, ovary at the bottom of only one gland body.

=== Fruits ===
Capsule is spindle type, fruit length is 7–12 cm, seeds are fluffy.
