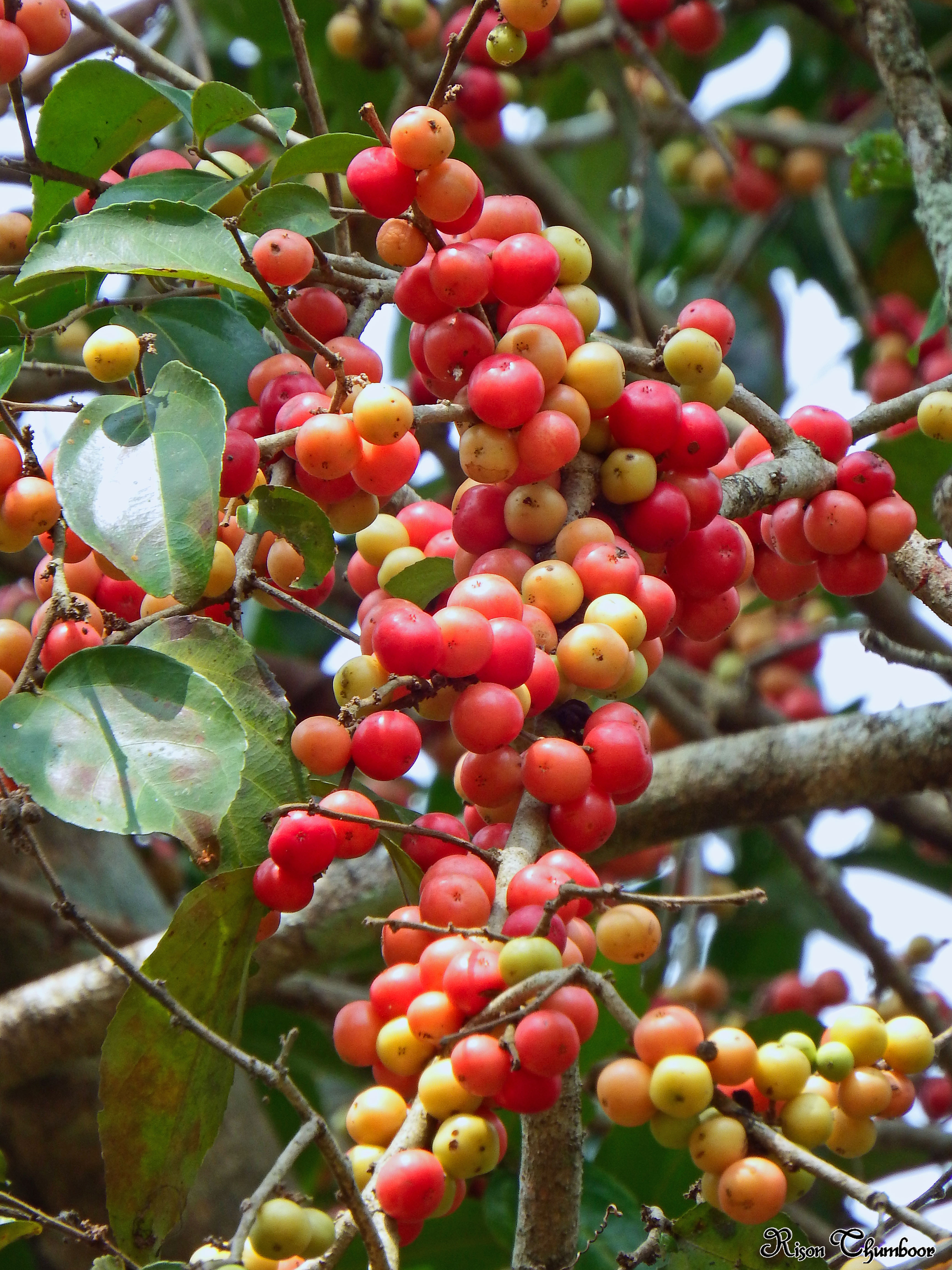

Scientific classification
- Kingdom: Plantae
- Clade: Tracheophytes
- Clade: Angiosperms
- Clade: Eudicots
- Clade: Rosids
- Order: Malpighiales
- Family: Salicaceae
- Genus: Flacourtia
- Species: F. montana

Binomial name
- Flacourtia montana J. Grah.

Synonyms
- Flacourtia inermis Miq. ex Hook. fil. & Thomsa

= Flacourtia montana =

Species of flowering plant

Flacourtia montana is a species of plant in the family Salicaceae. It is native to southern Asia. The species presents as a tree up to 20 m in height.

== Description ==
The tree can attain height about 25 m and girth up to 1.7 m. Tree trunk will be covered with sharp stout thorns at its base. Young parts of the tree are hirsute and young leaves are reddish. Leaves are simple and show alternate phyllotaxy. Petiole is pubescent with a length of 0.3-0.8 cm. Lamina size: 7-15 × 4-8 cm. Leaf shape is elliptic-oblong with acuminate leaf apex and crenate leaf margin. The leaf is 3-nerved at the base with 4-7 pairs of secondary nerves. Flowers are edible, dioecious, seen in axillary cymes. Fruits are spherical, smooth, scarlet red, with a size of 1-1.5 cm across.

== Distribution ==
This species is endemic to semi-evergreen and moist deciduous forests of Western Ghats, up to 1000 m (1800 m), in Maharashtra, Karnataka, Tamil Nadu and Kerala.

It is also known as Gajale, Hennu sampige, Nayibelain in Kannada, Tabluka in Tulu and Charal-maram in Malayalam.

== Uses ==
- Flacourtia montana can be used as food. Ripe fruits are eaten raw
- An important herb in Ayurveda, where infusions of the bark, leaves and root are used medicinally to treat conditions such as fever, diarrhoea and inflammations.
- The leaf is carminative, astringent and used as a tonic, an expectorant and for asthma, pain relief, gynaecological complaints and as an anthelmintic, and treatment for hydrocele, pneumonia and intestinal worms.
- In India, an infusion of the bark is used as a gargle for hoarseness. In Madagascar, the bark, triturated in oil, is used as an anti-rheumatic liniment. The bark is used as a tanning material.
- Wood used for agricultural implements such as ploughs etc

== Gallery ==
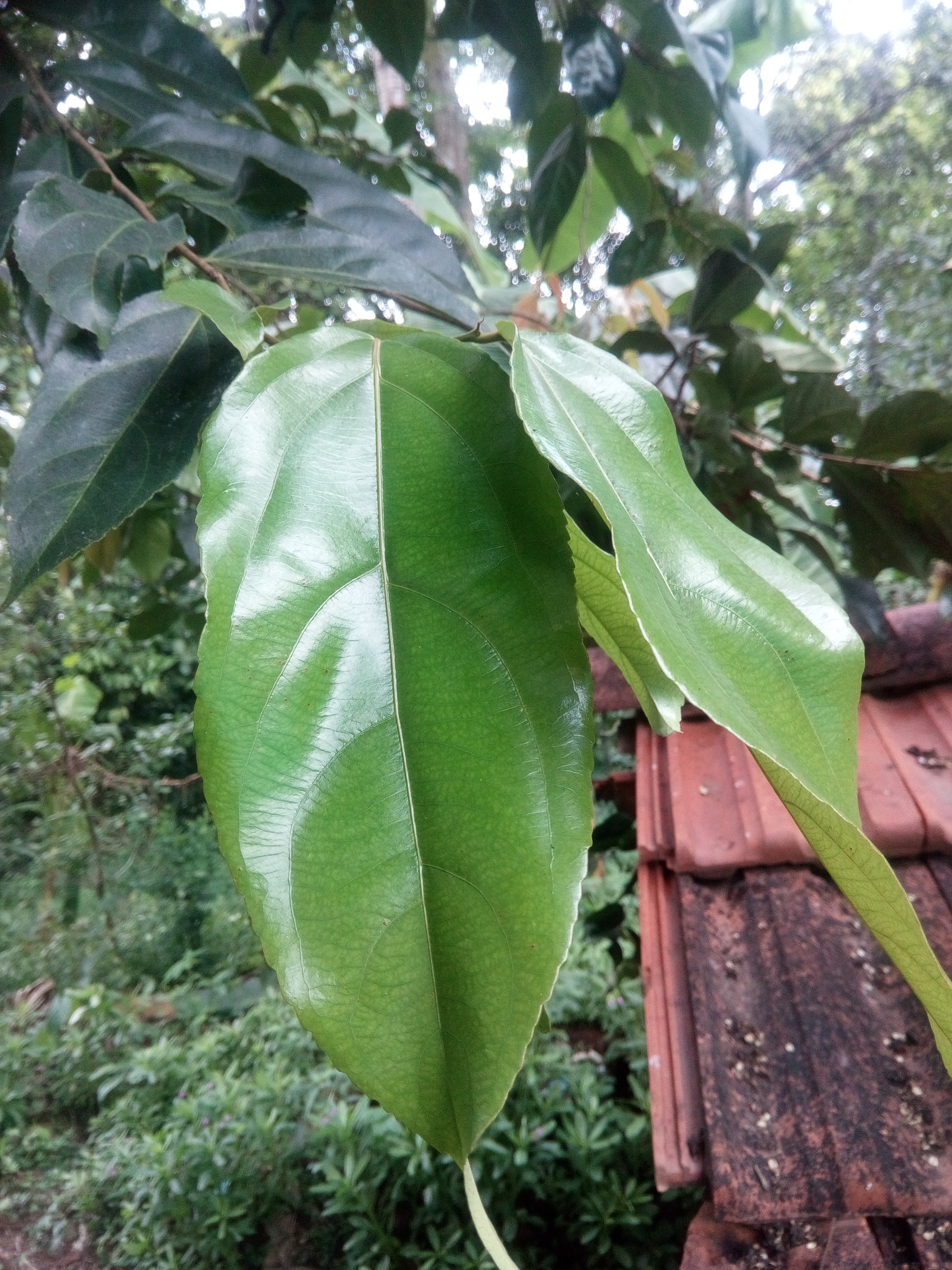

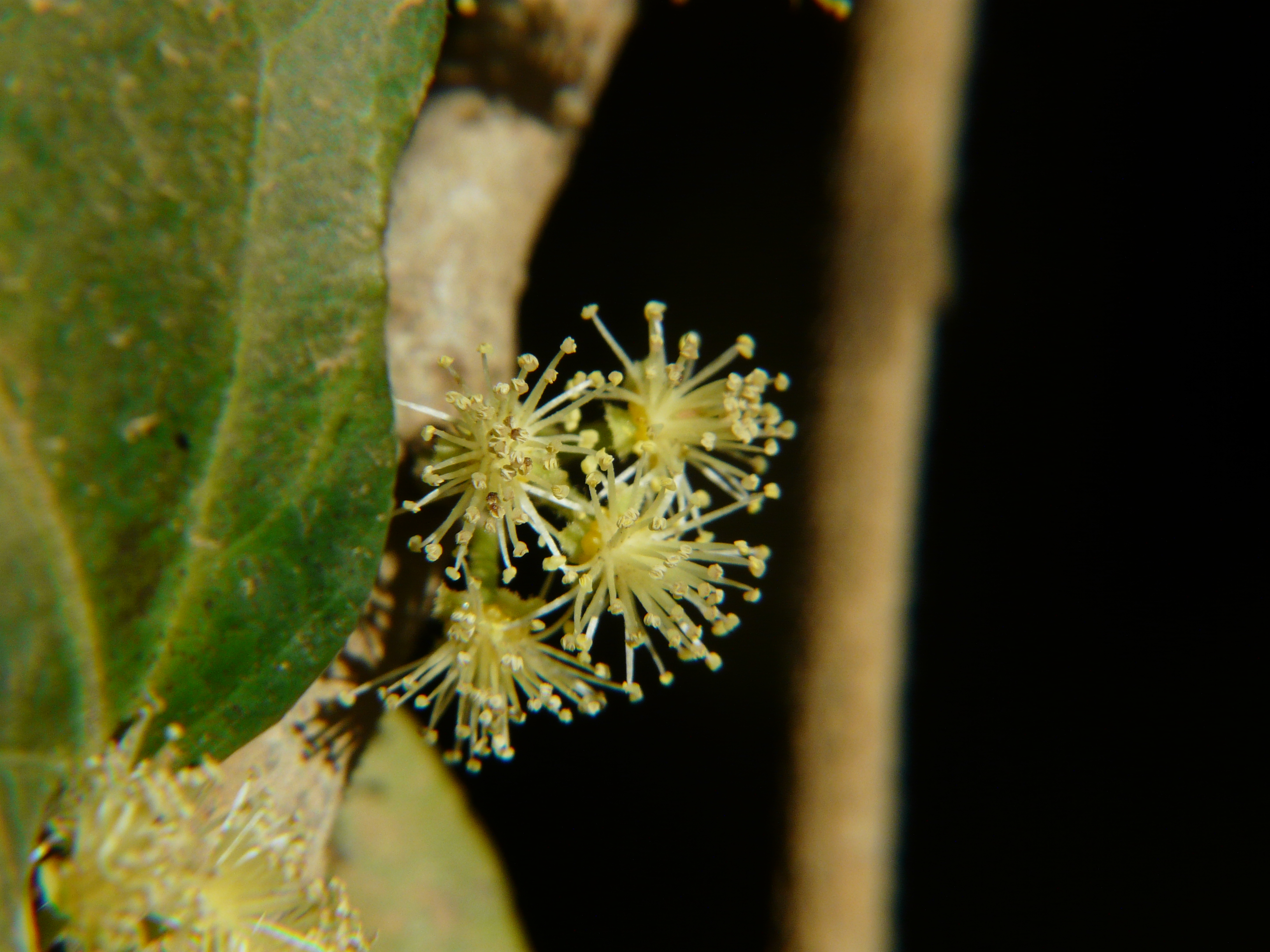

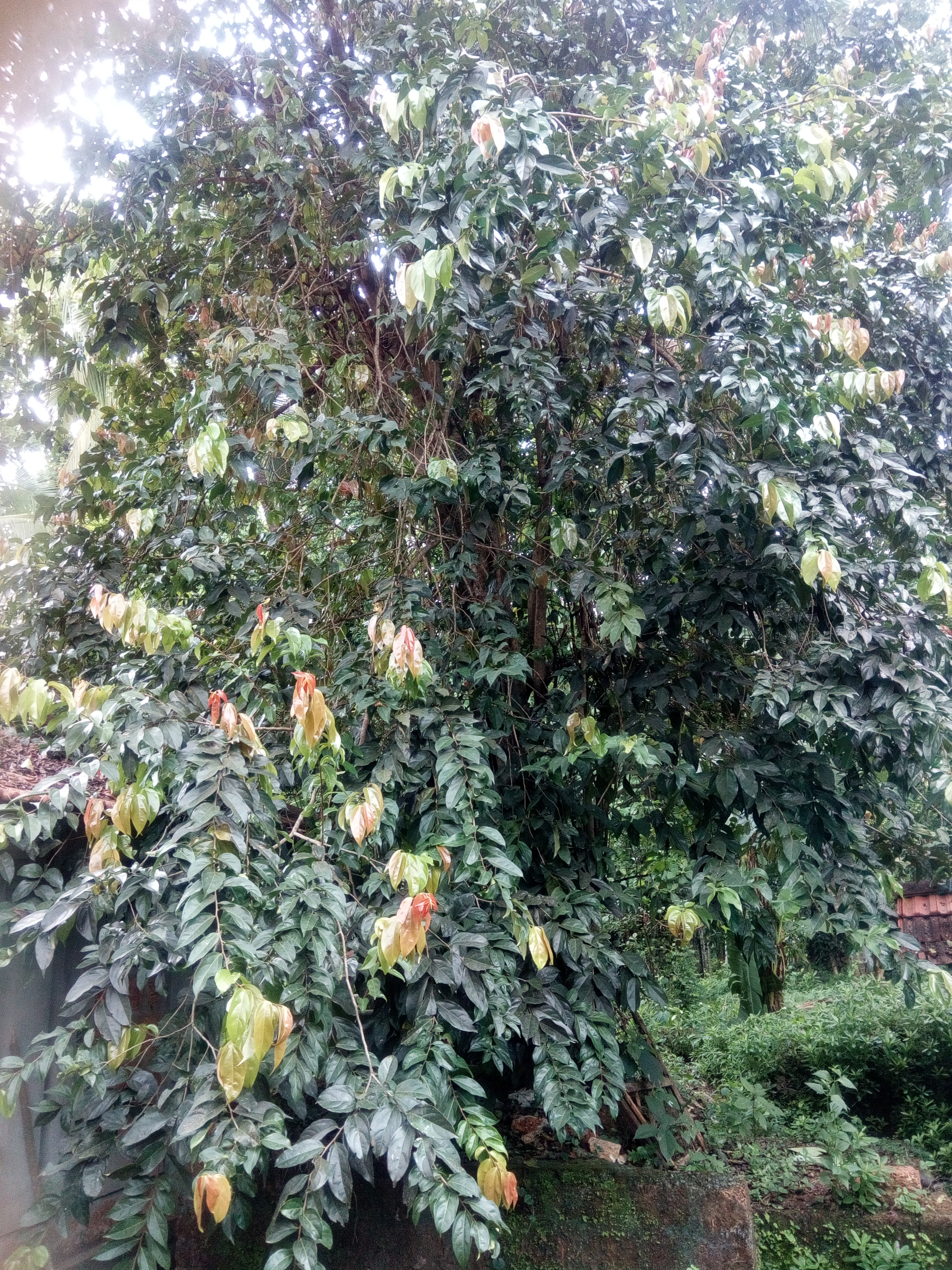

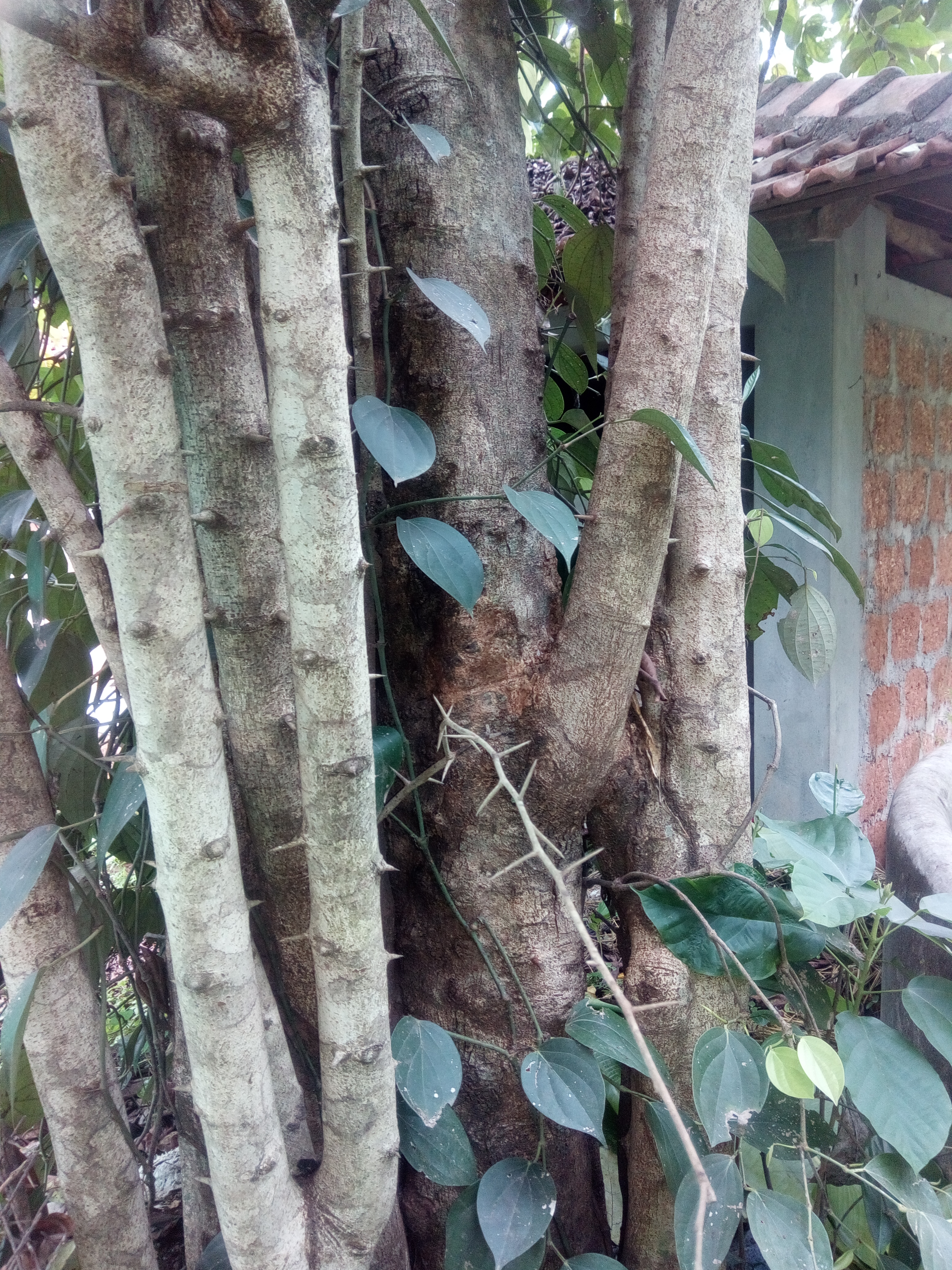
