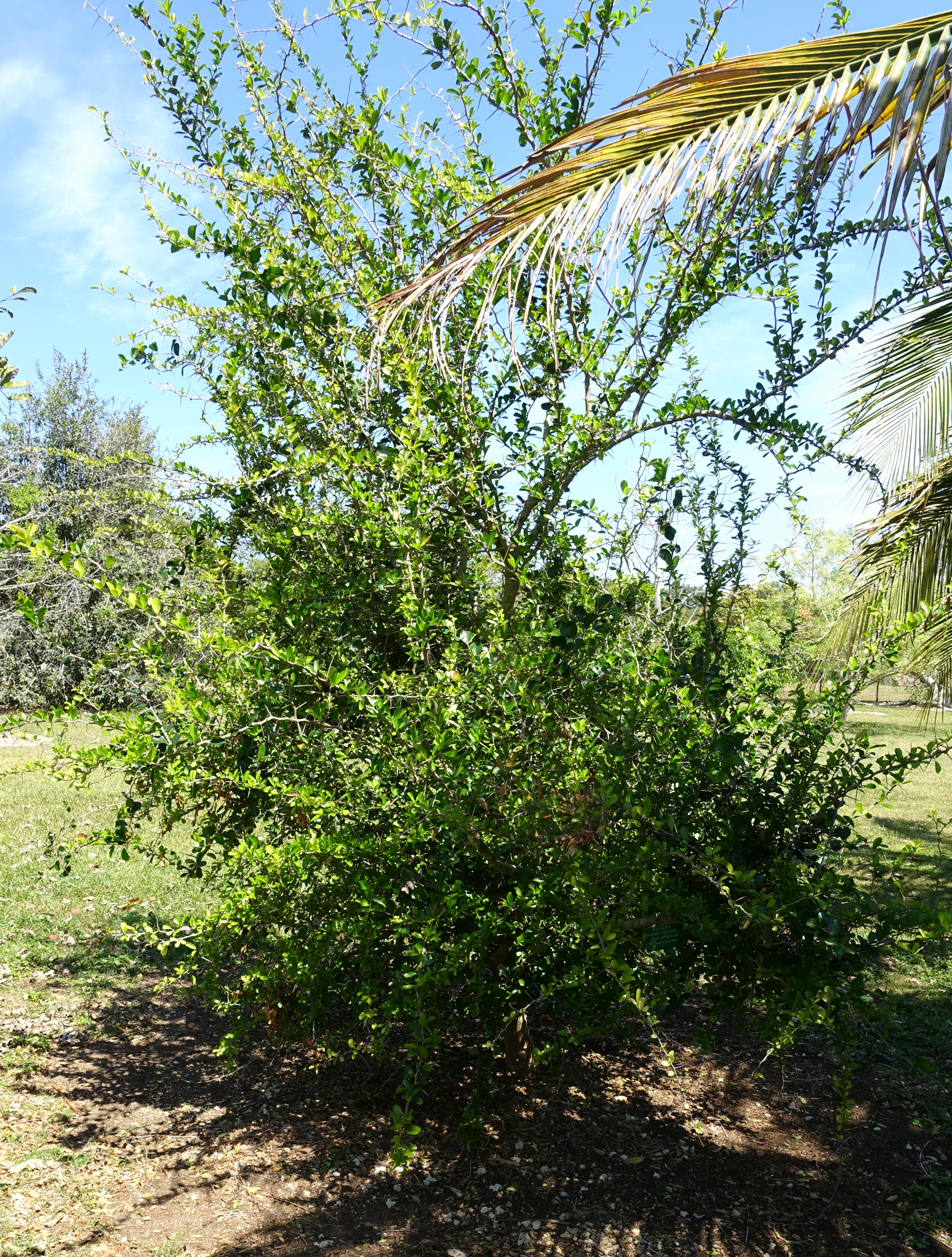

Conservation status
- Least Concern (IUCN 3.1)

Scientific classification
- Kingdom: Plantae
- Clade: Embryophytes
- Clade: Tracheophytes
- Clade: Angiosperms
- Clade: Eudicots
- Clade: Rosids
- Order: Malpighiales
- Family: Salicaceae
- Genus: Dovyalis
- Species: D. abyssinica

Binomial name
- Dovyalis abyssinica (A.Rich.) (Warb.), 1893

= Dovyalis abyssinica =

Species of plant

Dovyalis abyssinica, with common names African gooseberry, koshim in Amharic, and koshommii in Afan Oromo, is a species of shrub or small tree in the family of Salicaceae native to East Africa. It bears an edible fruit which is acidic and physically resembles an apricot.
