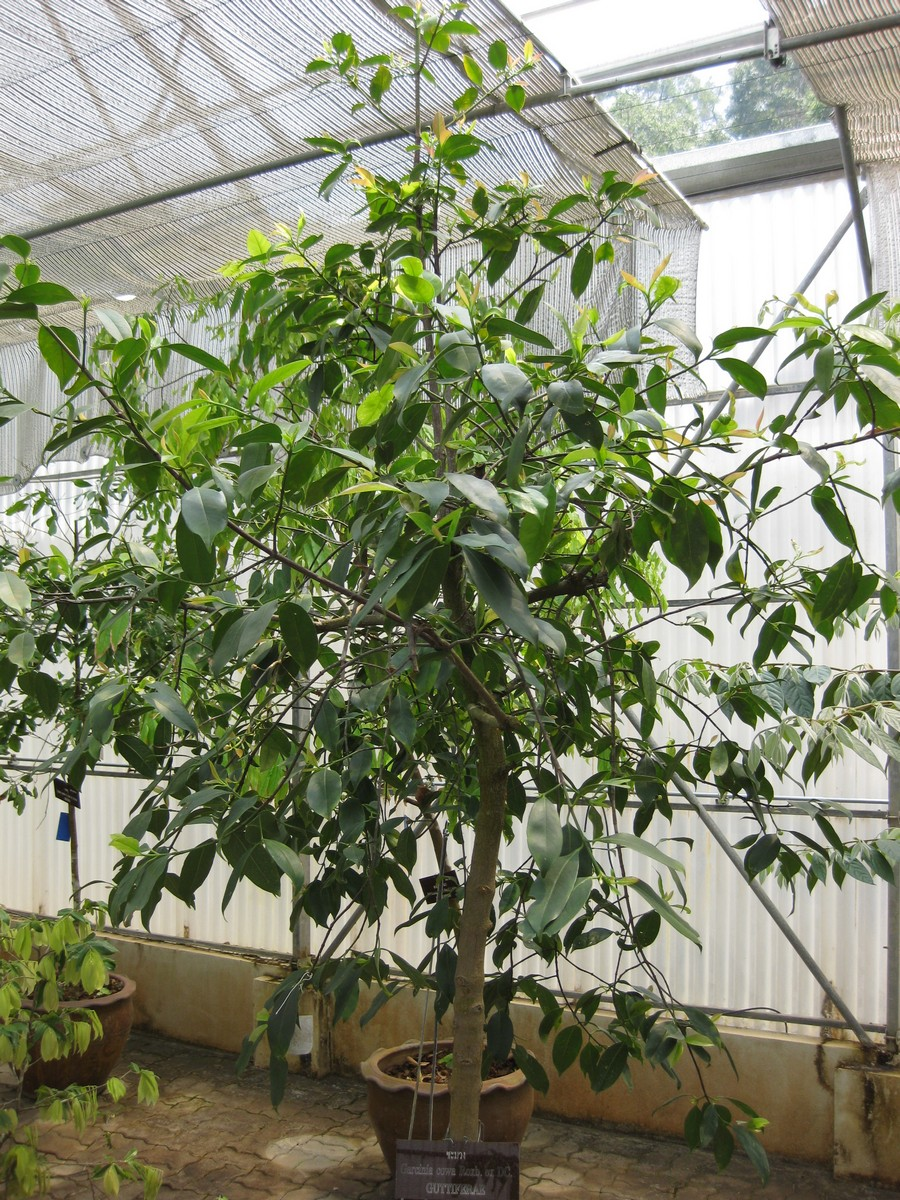

Conservation status
- Least Concern (IUCN 3.1)

Scientific classification
- Kingdom: Plantae
- Clade: Tracheophytes
- Clade: Angiosperms
- Clade: Eudicots
- Clade: Rosids
- Order: Malpighiales
- Family: Clusiaceae
- Genus: Garcinia
- Species: G. cowa

Binomial name
- Garcinia cowa Roxb. ex Choisy

Varieties
- Garcinia cowa var. cowa; Garcinia cowa var. kydia (Roxb.) Shameer & N.Mohanan

Synonyms
- Stalagmitis cowa (Roxb. ex Choisy) G.Don

= Garcinia cowa =

Fruit tree

Garcinia cowa, commonly known as cowa fruit or cowa mangosteen is an evergreen plant with edible fruit native to tropical Asia, including India, Nepal, Bangladesh, Myanmar, Peninsular Malaysia, Thailand, Vietnam, Laos, Cambodia, and Yunnan in southwestern China. The tree is harvested from the wild for its edible fruits and leaves, which are used locally. Flowers are yellow, male & female flowers are separated.

It is locally known as Kau Thekera (কাও থেকেৰা) in Assamese, Kawa or kau in Bengali and Malayalam, Kau in Manipuri.

== Uses ==
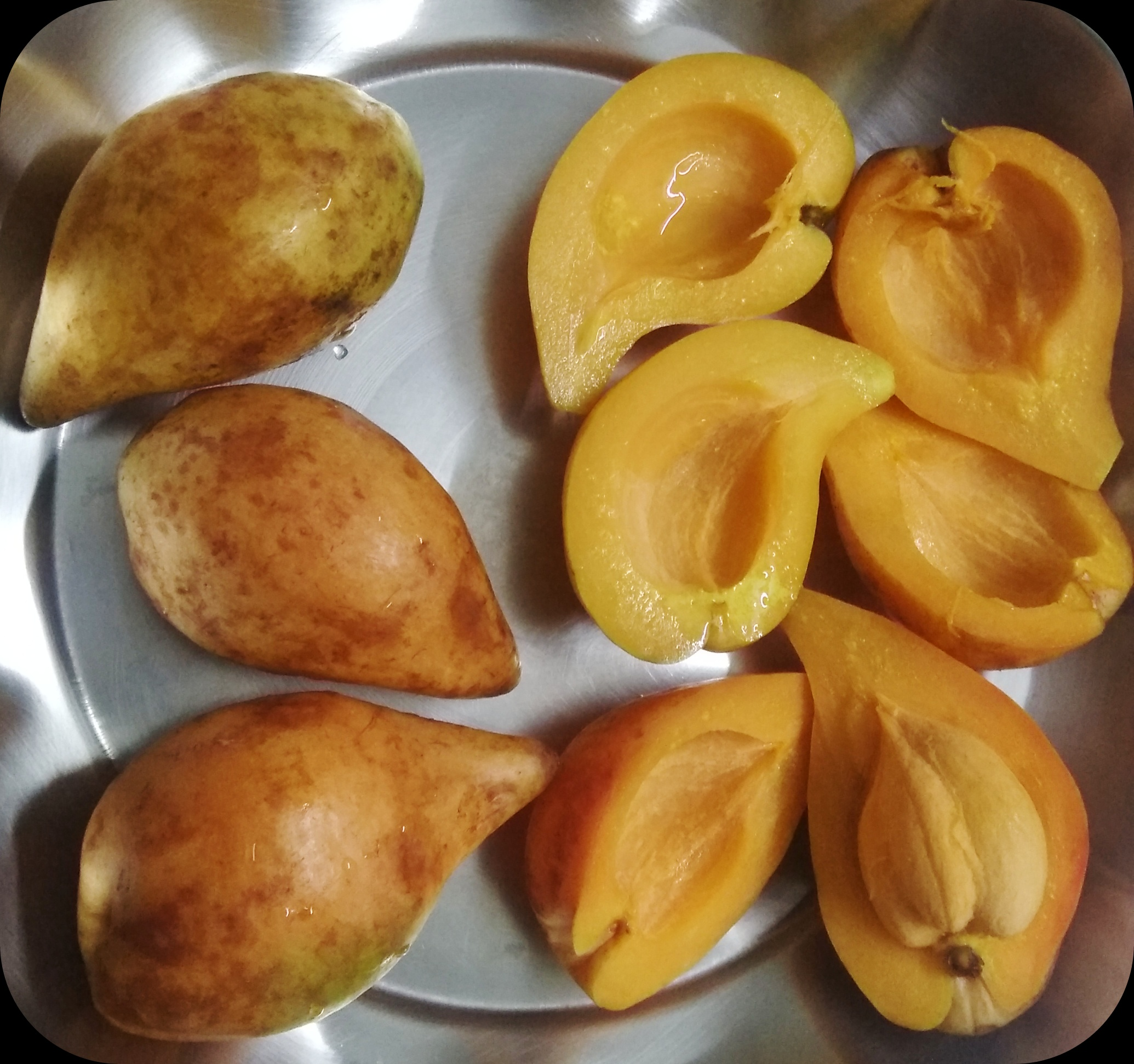
Whole fruits and fruit cross section of Garcinia cowa

=== Culinary ===
The fruit can be eaten raw and has an acidic flavor. It is used in curries as a tamarind-like flavoring, as well as being used for making pickles. It can be made into slices and sun-dried as a way to preserve it. Its leaves can also be cooked and eaten.

=== Folk medicine ===
In Thailand Garcinia cowa has been used in the local folk medicine, the bark as an antipyretic and antimicrobial, the latex as an antipuretic, and the fruits and leaves to improve blood circulation, as an expectorant for coughs and indigestion, and a laxative. The roots are believed to relieve fevers, and in East India, sun-dried slices of the fruit have been used as a treatment for dysentery.

=== Anti-malarial ===
Studies have found that the bark contains five xanthones with anti-malarial properties in vitro against Plasmodium falciparum.

=== Dyes and resins ===
The bark is also used to produce a yellow dye for clothes. The gum resin is used in varnishes.

== See also ==
- Mangosteen
- Garcinia assamica
- Garcinia dulcis
- Garcinia lanceifolia
- Garcinia morella
- Garcinia pedunculata
- Garcinia xanthochymus
