= Garcinia assamica =

Conservation status
- Data Deficient (IUCN 3.1)

Scientific classification
- Kingdom: Plantae
- Clade: Embryophytes
- Clade: Tracheophytes
- Clade: Spermatophytes
- Clade: Angiosperms
- Clade: Eudicots
- Clade: Rosids
- Order: Malpighiales
- Family: Clusiaceae
- Genus: Garcinia
- Species: G. assamica

Binomial name
- Garcinia assamica J.Sarma, Shameer & N.Mohanan

Fruit tree

Garcinia assamica is a newly discovered species of plant found in areas near Manas National Park, Assam. It seems to be rare and is hitherto only known from very few individuals, near to a rivulet. This new species is allied to Garcinia nigrolineata in arrangement of flowers on axillary short spikes; arrangement of stamens on a convexdisc and number and arrangement of staminodes in female flowers; but it is distinct from the latter in having greenish-yellow (not yellowish) exudate; 2–5 female flowers fascicled at nodes against solitary flowers; 4–5-locular ovaries against 5–7-locular ones.

== See also ==
- Mangosteen
- Garcinia pedunculata
- Garcinia xanthochymus
- Garcinia cowa
- Garcinia lanceifolia
- Garcinia morella
