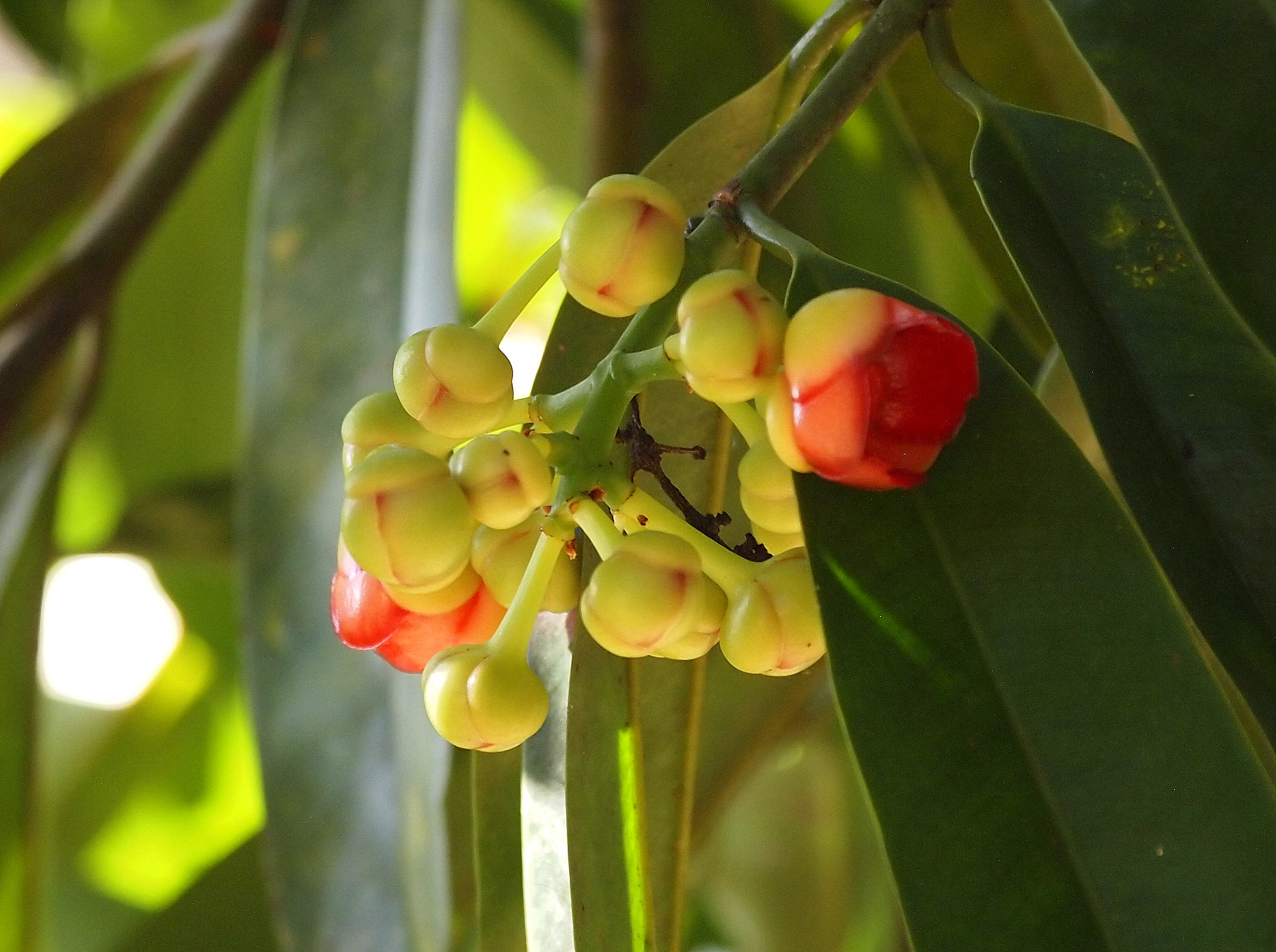
- Flowering Garcinia atroviridis

Conservation status
- Least Concern (IUCN 3.1)

Scientific classification
- Kingdom: Plantae
- Clade: Tracheophytes
- Clade: Angiosperms
- Clade: Eudicots
- Clade: Rosids
- Order: Malpighiales
- Family: Clusiaceae
- Genus: Garcinia
- Species: G. atroviridis

Binomial name
- Garcinia atroviridis Griff. ex T.Anderson

= Garcinia atroviridis =

Species of tree

Garcinia atroviridis, known as asam gelugur, asam gelugo, or asam keping (in Malay, Thai: ส้มแขก) is a large rainforest tree which ranges from the eastern Himalayas through Myanmar and Thailand to Peninsular Malaysia, Borneo, and Sumatra. Garcinia atroviridis is commonly found in evergreen forests in the southern region of Thailand and Malaysia. This species grows wild throughout Peninsular Malaysia but is also widely cultivated, especially in the northern states, owing to its economic and medicinal value.

== Description ==
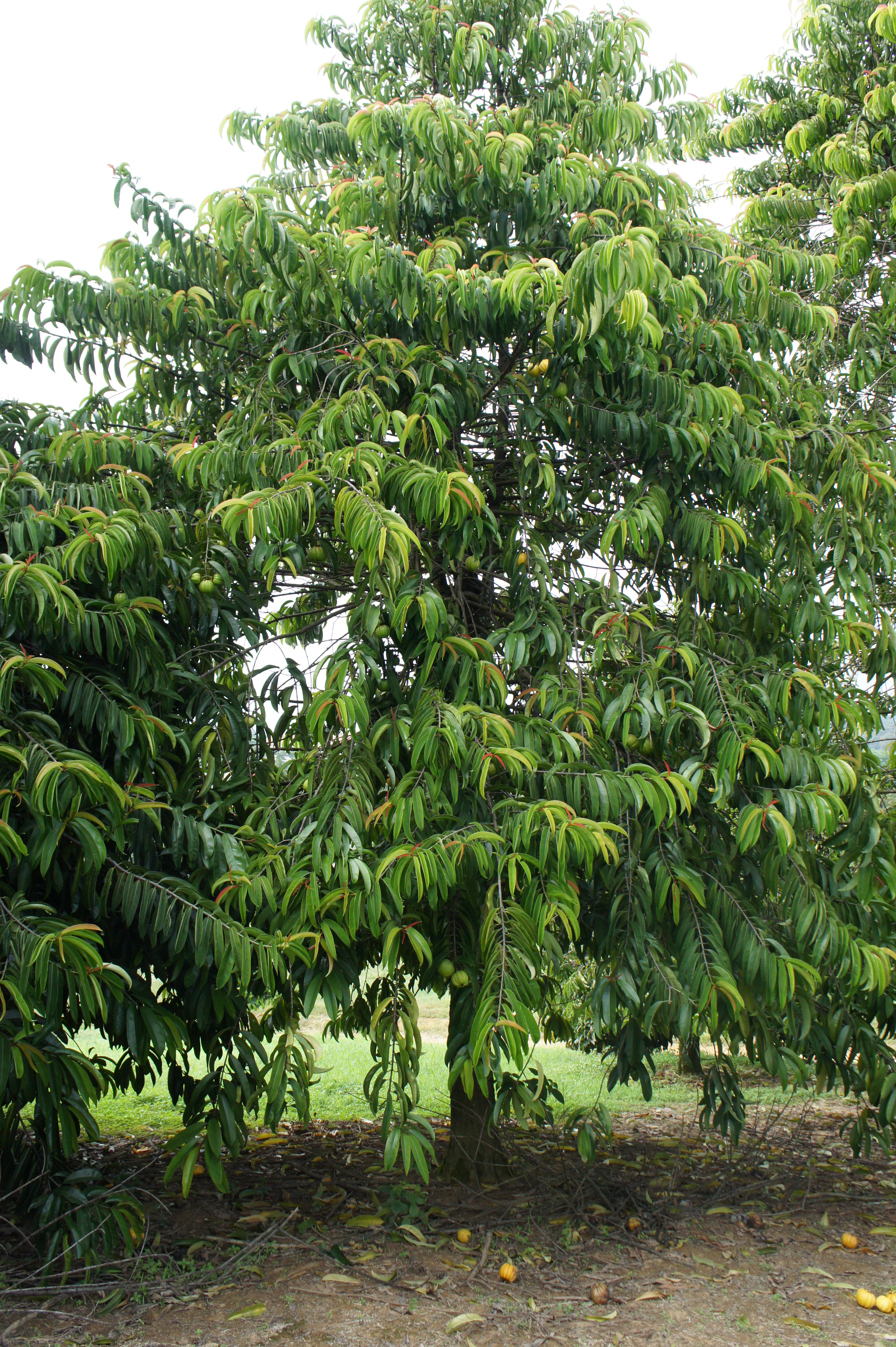
Growth habit

The tree grows to a height of more than 20 m and has a long trunk, smooth grey bark and drooping branches. The leaves are dark green, shiny, long and narrow with a pointed tip and upturned edges. The species is dioecious with male and female flowers on separate trees. The flowers are dark red. The round fruits are borne singly on twig ends about 7–10 cm in diameter. The ripe fruits are bright orange yellow, which are sliced, dried and used in curries or stewed in plenty of sugar to be eaten.

== Uses ==
The fruit contains citric acid, tartaric acid, malic acid and ascorbic acid, hydroxycitric acid, and flavonoids.

Ripe asam fruit is bright-yellow orange. Sun-dried slices of the fruit, locally known as "asam keping", are commercially available and are popularly used as a souring agent for curries and soups.

Asam gelugor is a perennial fruit tree native to the tropical climate in Malaysia. The trees can also be found in other parts of South East Asia, particularly in Thailand where demand for the asam fruit is increasing.

== Gallery ==
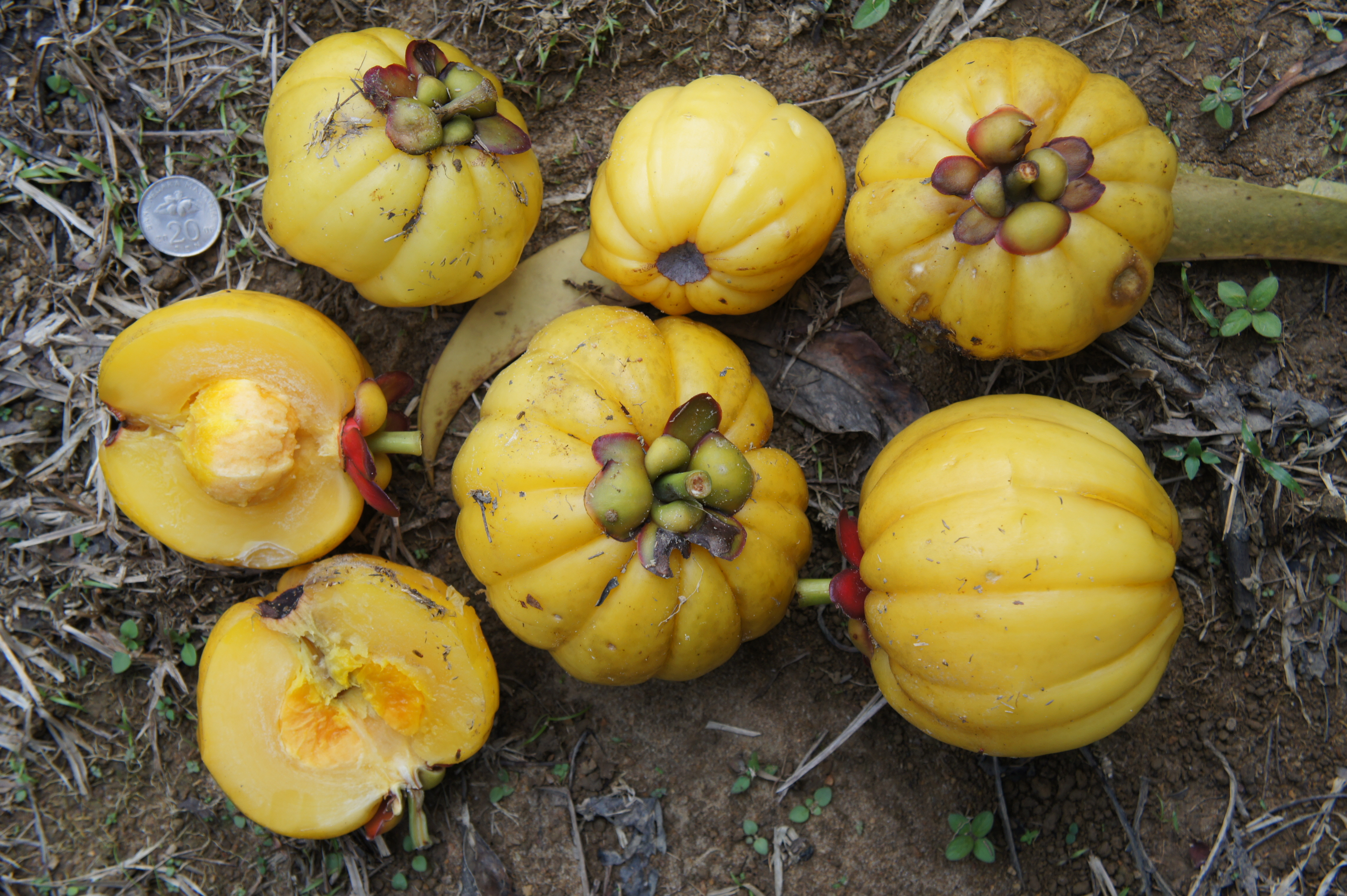
Ripe fruits with a coin for scale

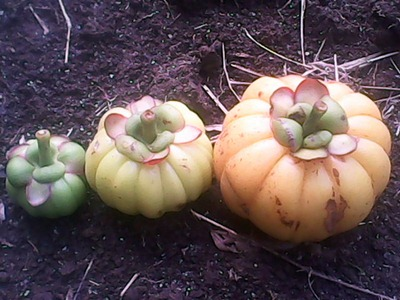
Stages of ripeness

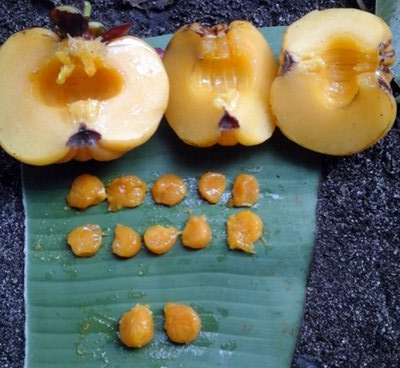
Cross sections and pulp

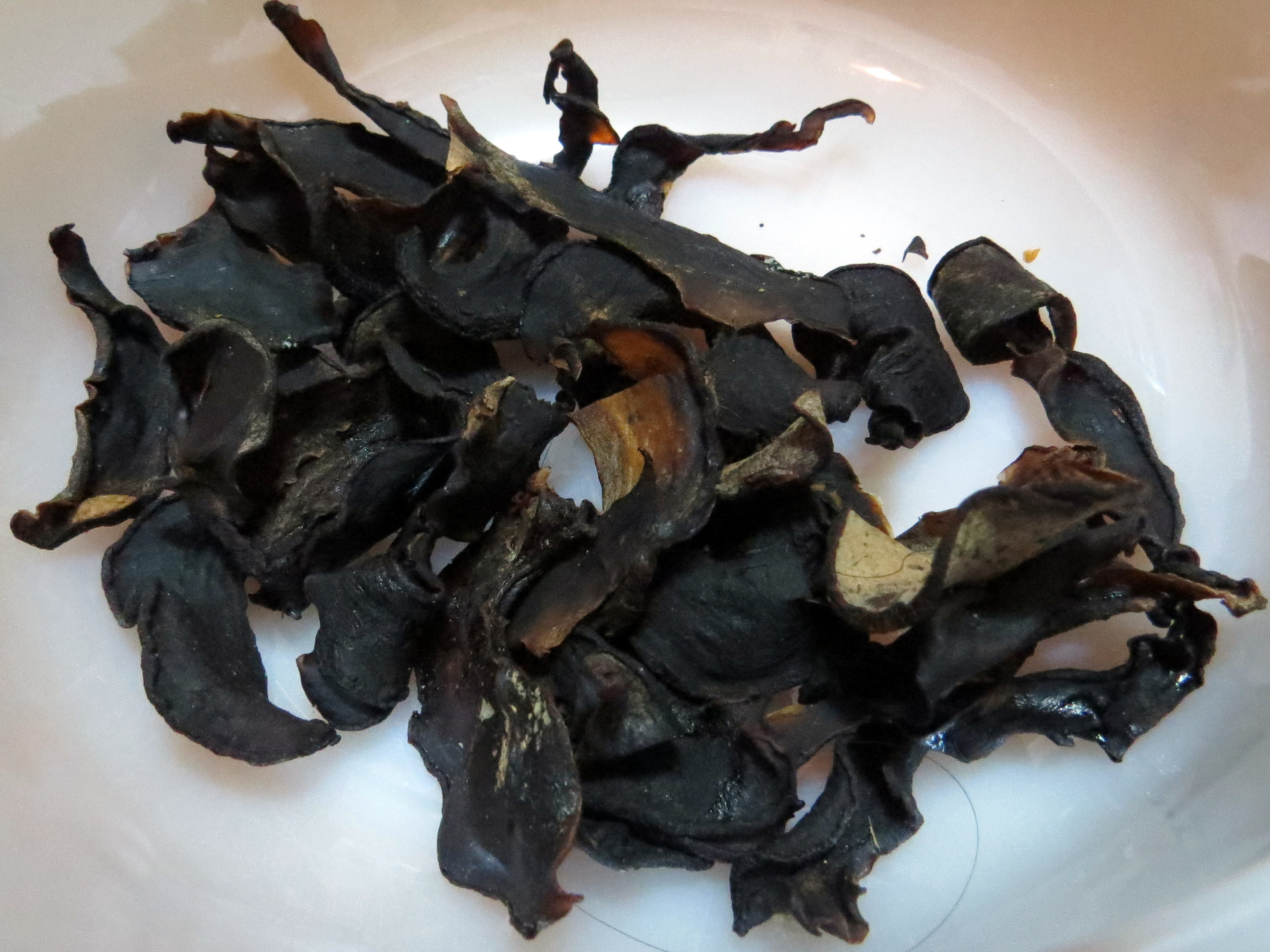
Dried flesh ready for culinary use

== See also ==
- Garcinia binucao, a related species used similarly in the Philippines
- Garcinia dulcis
- Garcinia gummi-gutta
- Garcinia morella
