= Som Kaek =

Som Kaek may refer to:

- Assam fruit
- Garcinia atroviridis
- Gambooge
