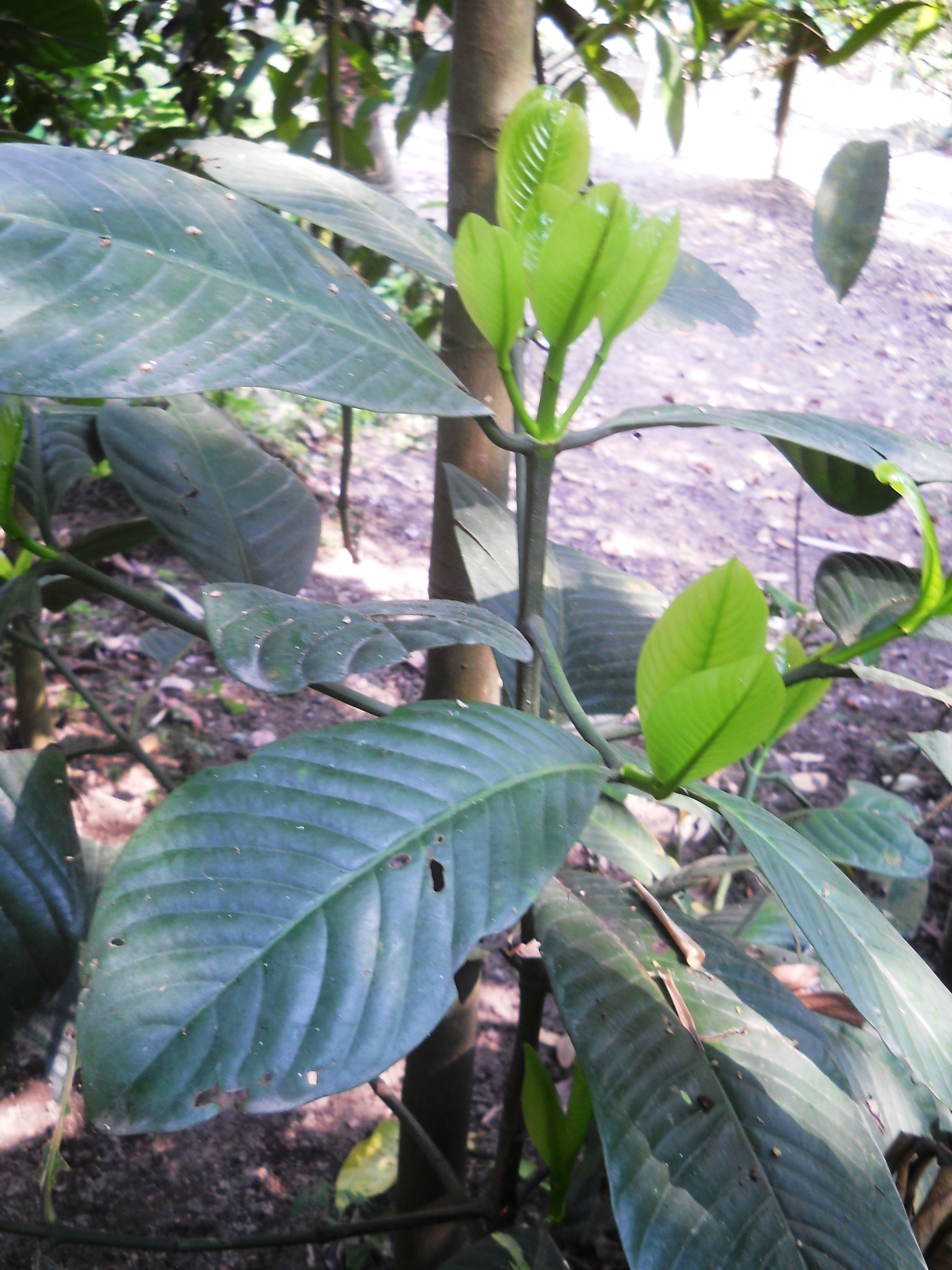

Conservation status
- Least Concern (IUCN 3.1)

Scientific classification
- Kingdom: Plantae
- Clade: Tracheophytes
- Clade: Angiosperms
- Clade: Eudicots
- Clade: Rosids
- Order: Malpighiales
- Family: Clusiaceae
- Genus: Garcinia
- Species: G. pedunculata

Binomial name
- Garcinia pedunculata Roxb. ex Buch.-Ham.

Synonyms
- Garcinia planchonii Pierre

= Garcinia pedunculata =

Species of flowering plant

Garcinia pedunculata is an evergreen tree related to the purple mangosteen (Garcinia mangostana). The tree is native to south-eastern Asia, including northeastern India, Bangladesh, the eastern Himalayas southeastern Tibet, northern Indochina (Laos, Myanmar, Thailand, and Vietnam), and western Yunnan in south-central China. It is popularly known in India as Amlavetasa, in Bangladesh as Thoikor or Taikor and in Assam as Bor Thekera(বৰ থেকেৰা ). It is a large evergreen tree which grows in mixed deciduous forests, dry evergreen forests, lower montane rain forests, at dry evergreen and tropical evergreen rain forest edges, and along streams, from sea level to 1,200 metres elevation.

== Tree and fruit ==
Garcinia pedunculata is a large evergreen tree with a fluted trunk and short spreading branches. Leaves are lanceolate with prominent midribs. Male flowers are light green in sparsely flowered panicles. The female flowers are solitary. The roundish fruit has a diameter ranging between 8 and 12 cm. It has a juicy interior with edible arils.

== Uses ==
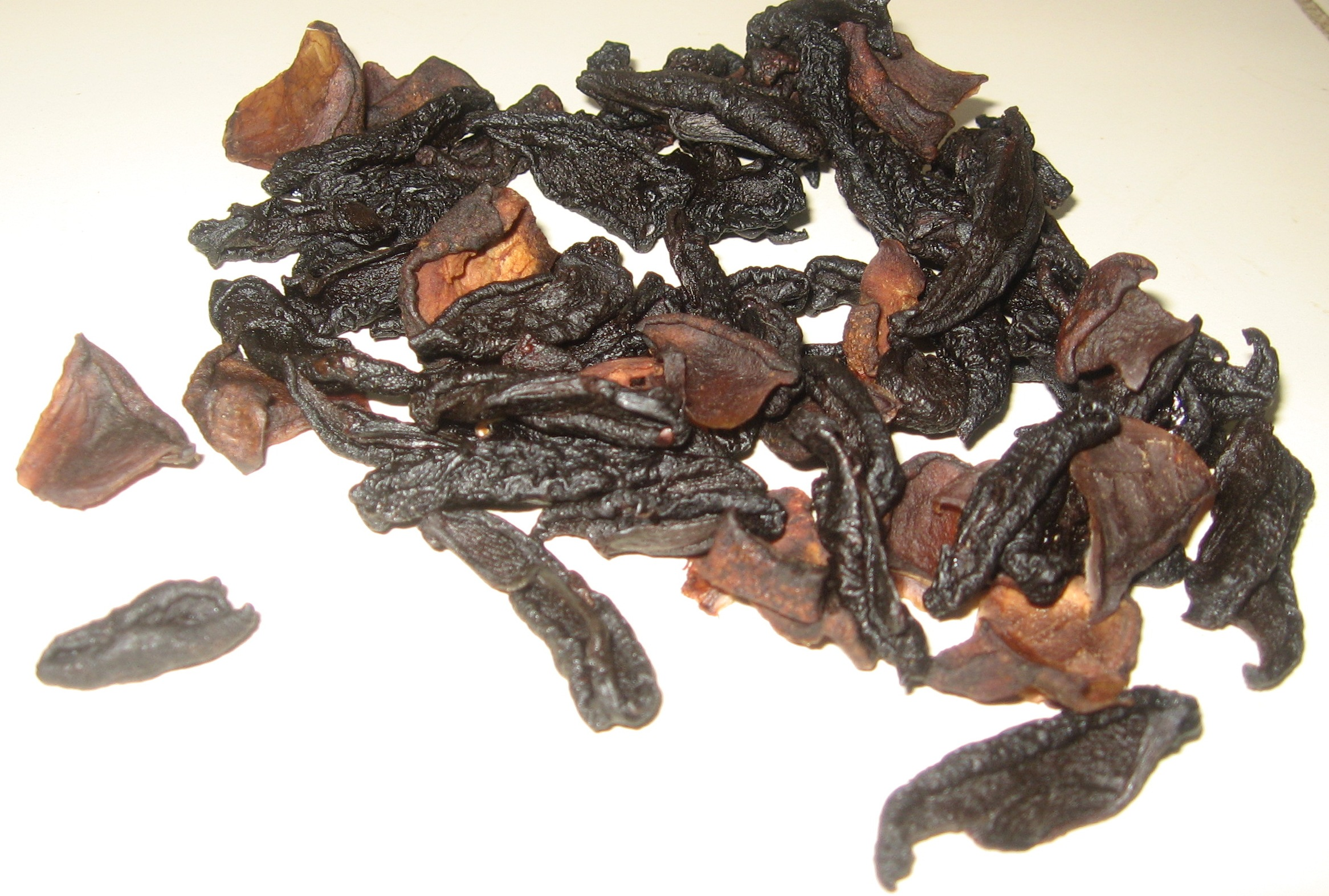
Dried fruit of Garcinia pedunculata

The ripe fruit is eaten cooked or raw. Usually the ripe or raw fruits are sliced, sun-dried and preserved. In the state of Assam the fruit is used in cooking to add a sour flavour.

== See also ==
- Mangosteen
- Garcinia assamica
- Garcinia xanthochymus
- Garcinia cowa
- Garcinia lanceifolia
- Garcinia morella
