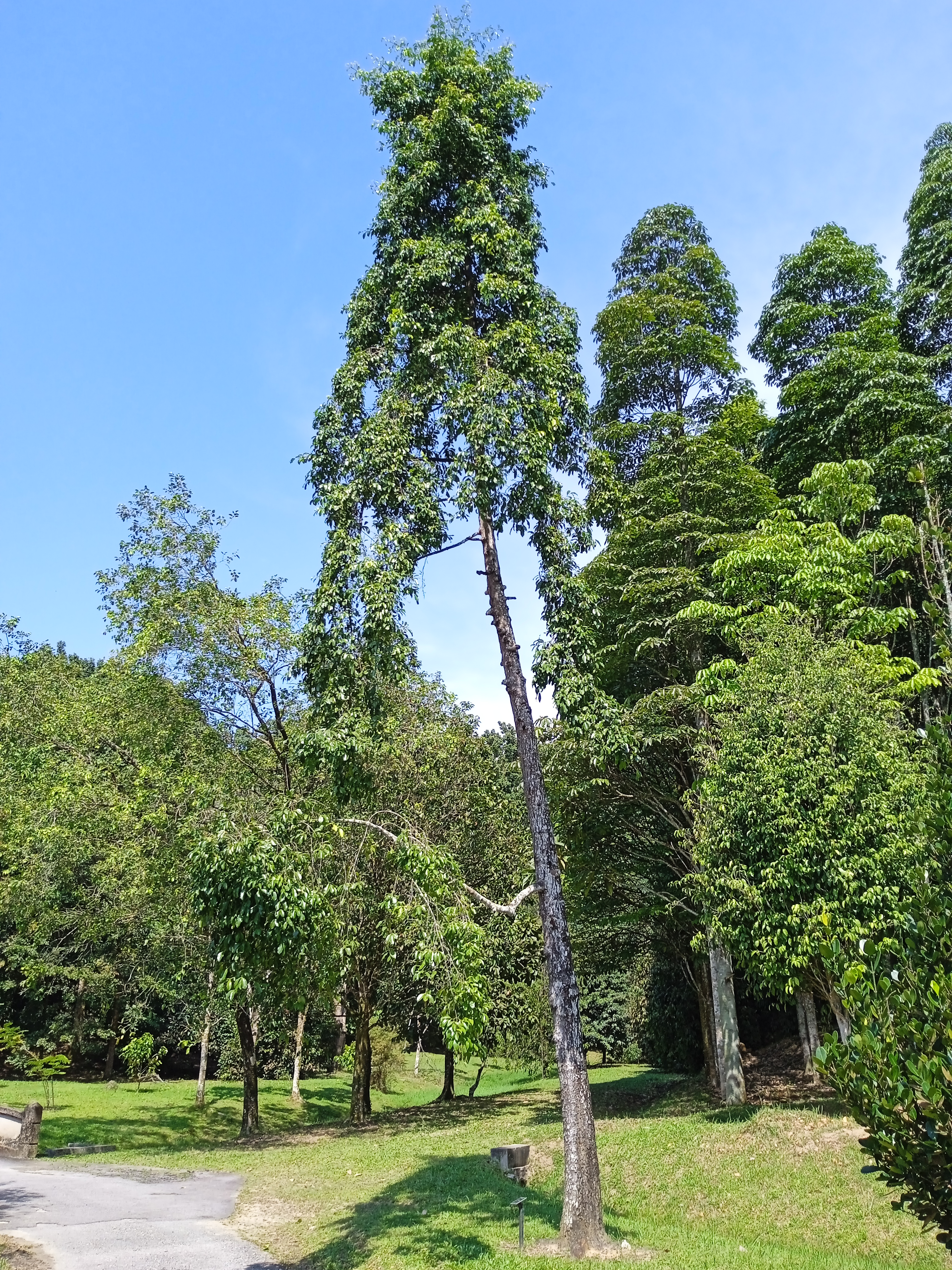

Conservation status
- Least Concern (IUCN 3.1)

Scientific classification
- Kingdom: Plantae
- Clade: Tracheophytes
- Clade: Angiosperms
- Clade: Eudicots
- Clade: Rosids
- Order: Malpighiales
- Family: Clusiaceae
- Genus: Garcinia
- Species: G. nigrolineata

Binomial name
- Garcinia nigrolineata Planch. ex T.Anderson

Synonyms
- Garcinia kunstleri King

= Garcinia nigrolineata =

Species of tree

Garcinia nigrolineata has been called "wild beaked Kandis" (from the Malay name – see below) and is a species of flowering plant in the family Clusiaceae. It is a tree native to Assam, Myanmar, Peninsular Malaysia, and Vietnam in tropical Asia. The Catalogue of Life lists no subspecies.

== Description and vernacular names ==
Garcinia nigrolineata is an Asian tropical forest under-storey tree some 10–14 m high;: well-illustrated in Trees of Tropical of Asia. Leaves are approx. 100 x 35 mm. Flowers have 3 mm petals with 25 stamens in a head. Fruits are orange when mature, approx. 30 mm: developing from a 5-7 celled ovary.

Names for this plant include:

- Indonesian: Kandis Keling
- Malay: Kandis Gajah, Kandis Jantan, Kandis
- Thai: ชะมวง Chamuang
- Vietnamese – bứa lằn đen or bứa đen

== Gallery ==
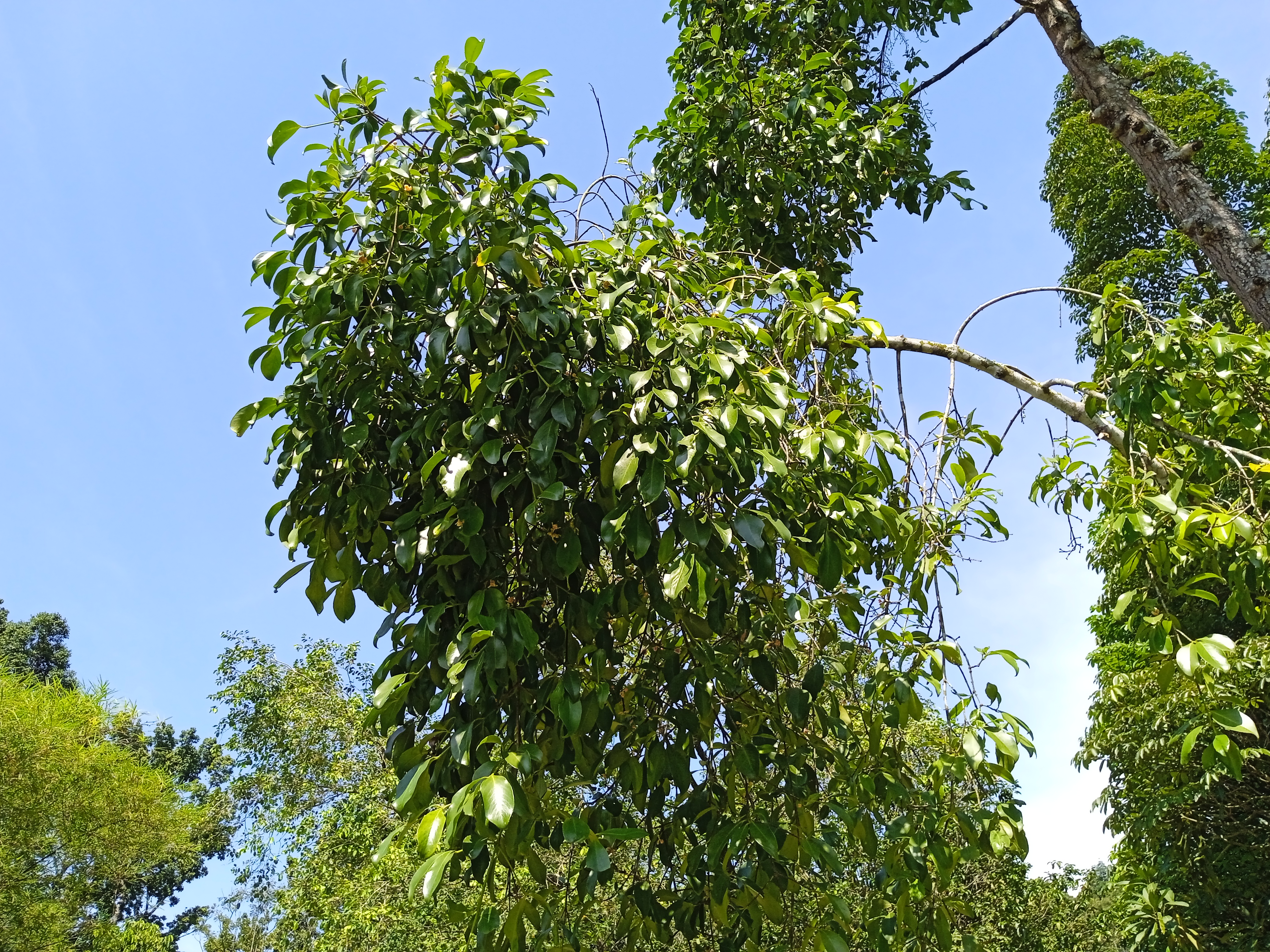
Garcinia nigrolineata leaves

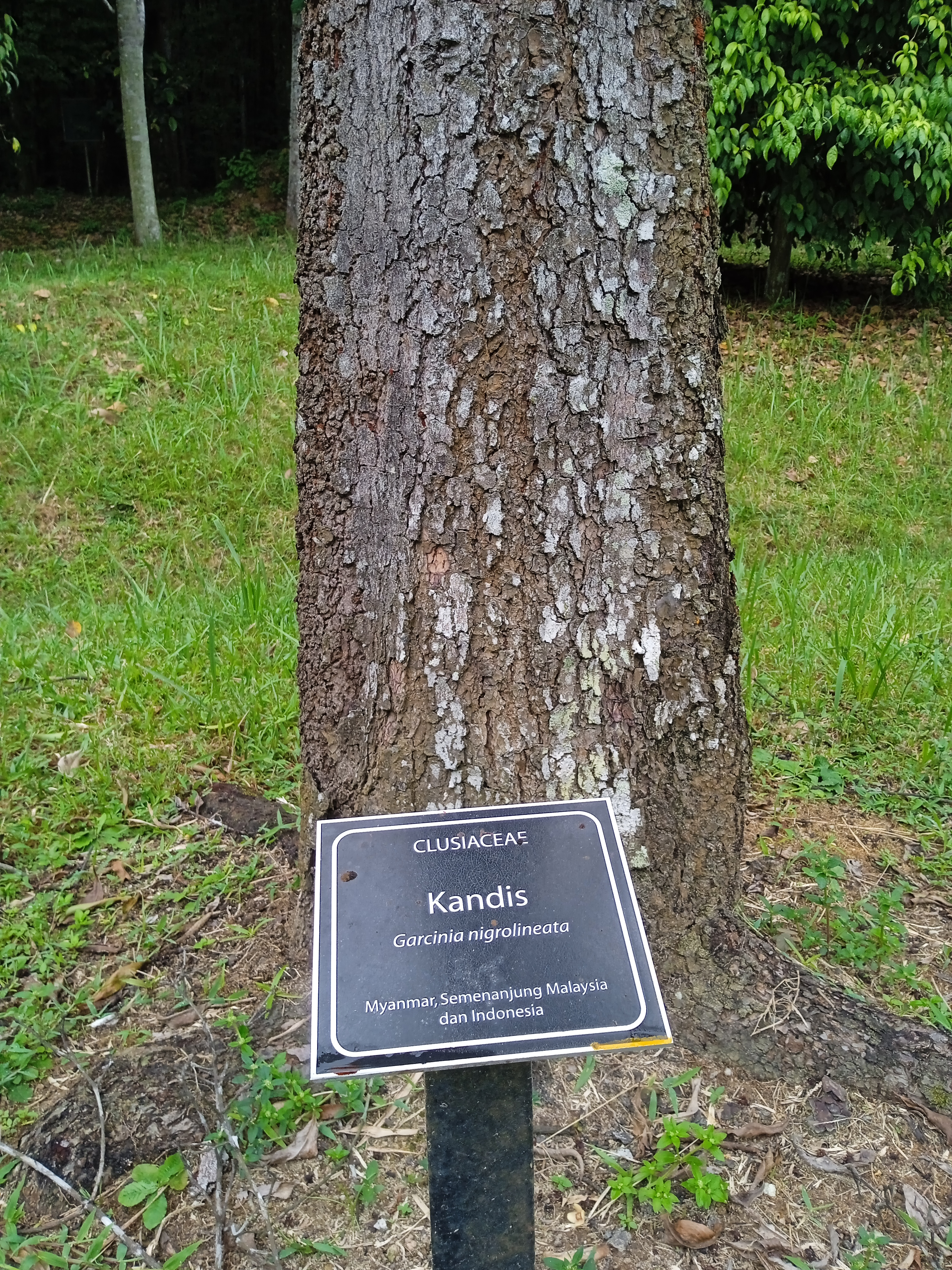
Garcinia nigrolineata bark

== See also ==
- Garcinia assamica
