= Garcinia binucao =

Conservation status
- Least Concern (IUCN 3.1)

Scientific classification
- Kingdom: Plantae
- Clade: Tracheophytes
- Clade: Angiosperms
- Clade: Eudicots
- Clade: Rosids
- Order: Malpighiales
- Family: Clusiaceae
- Genus: Garcinia
- Species: G. binucao

Binomial name
- Garcinia binucao (Blanco) Choisy

Synonyms
- Cambogia binucao Blanco; Garcinia duodecandra Pierre

Species of plant in the family Clusiaceae

Garcinia binucao is a species of flowering plant in the Clusiaceae family. It is commonly known as binukaw, takway or batuan, is a species of Garcinia endemic to the Philippines. It is not cultivated, though its edible fruits are harvested from the wild for use as a souring agent in some Filipino dishes.

== Taxonomy ==
Binukaw belongs to the genus Garcinia (the mangosteens) of the family Clusiaceae. The first description of the correct name of the species is attributed to the French botanist Jacques Denys Choisy in Description des guttifères de l'Inde (1849) based on the basionym Cambogia binucao from the Spanish friar and botanist Francisco Manuel Blanco in Flora de Filipinas in 1837.

The plant is known as binukaw (also spelled binucao, binukau, or bilukaw) in Tagalog, and batuan in Visayan languages. Other names include Ilocano balakut, Bikol buragris, and Panay Visayan haras. The common names are sometimes shared with other similar Garcinia species in the Philippines like Garcinia morella.

The species was first described as Cambogia binucao by Francisco Manuel Blanco in 1837. In 1849 Jacques Denys Choisy placed the species in genus Garcinia as G. binucao.

== Description ==
Binukaw is an evergreen tree growing to a maximum height of around 25 m (82 ft) with a trunk around 40 cm (16 in) in diameter. The leaves are oblong to obovate around 5 to 12 cm (2.0 to 4.7 in) long and 4 to 7 cm (1.6 to 2.8 in) wide. The flowers are reddish to creamy white in color. The fruits are round berries, around 4 cm (1.6 in) in diameter with a juicy pulp and numerous seeds.

== Distribution ==
Binukaw is endemic to the Philippines, and is only found in the western Visayas region, such as Panay and Negros.

== Culinary ==
The sour fruits are edible and can be eaten raw. They are also commonly used as a souring agent in traditional Filipino dishes like sinigang, Kadyos, baboy, kag langka, and cansi. Because cultivation of the fruit is limited to the western Visayas, it has also been sold in powder or paste form, or as jams or other sauces for easier distribution elsewhere in the Philippines.

'Takway' is called "pansit ng bukid" since it grows almost anywhere in the fields. In Iloilo, it is called "palutpot" or "runners" of root crops or taro. As culinary ingredient, it combines with coconut milk, like ginataang alimango. In Davao City, paksiw na takway is blended with mora moro or mackerel scad (galunggong).

== Conservation ==
The species is becoming rare due to illegal logging and deforestation for agriculture.

== See also ==
- Garcinia atroviridis, a related species used similarly in Malaysia, Indonesia, and Thailand
- Garcinia dulcis
- Garcinia gummi-gutta
- Garcinia morella
