= Hydroxycitric acid =

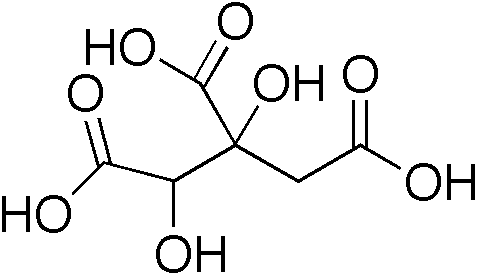

Names
- Preferred IUPAC name 1,2-Dihydroxypropane-1,2,3-tricarboxylic acid
- Other names Hydroxycitrate (anion name)

Identifiers
CAS Number	6205-14-7
3D model (JSmol)	Interactive image
ChemSpider	110439
PubChem CID	123908
UNII	8W94T9026R
CompTox Dashboard (EPA)	DTXSID80863711
- InChI: InChI=1S/C6H8O8/c7-2(8)1-6(14,5(12)13)3(9)4(10)11/h3,9,14H,1H2,(H,7,8)(H,10,11)(H,12,13) Key: ZMJBYMUCKBYSCP-UHFFFAOYSA-N; InChI=1/C6H8O8/c7-2(8)1-6(14,5(12)13)3(9)4(10)11/h3,9,14H,1H2,(H,7,8)(H,10,11)(H,12,13) Key: ZMJBYMUCKBYSCP-UHFFFAOYAQ
- SMILES: O=C(O)C(O)C(O)(C(=O)O)CC(=O)O

Properties
Chemical formula	C_{6}H_{8}O_{8}
Molar mass	208.122 g·mol^{−1}
- Except where otherwise noted, data are given for materials in their standard state (at 25 °C [77 °F], 100 kPa). verify (what is ?) Infobox references

Hydroxycitric acid (HCA) is a derivative of citric acid that is found in a variety of tropical plants including Garcinia cambogia and Hibiscus sabdariffa.

There are four isomers, (+)- and (-)-hydroxycitric acid, and (+)- and (-)-allo-hydroxycitric acid. The (-)-hydroxycitric acid isomer is the one found in Garcinia.

== Chemistry ==
Hydroxycitric acid as such cannot be isolated from garcinia fruits or hibiscus sabdariffa fruits. It exists in both the open and lactone forms. The presence of two chiral centres in the molecule is exploited to construct molecular skeletons that are otherwise difficult to synthesize, thus demonstrating the lactones use as chirons.

== Biological effects ==
(-)-HCA is a competitive inhibitor of ATP citrate lyase, which converts citrate into oxaloacetate and acetyl CoA. The reverse of this conversion is a step in the citric acid cycle.

Laboratory and animal studies of HCA have produced results that indicate a potential for modulation of lipid metabolism. A meta-analysis published in 2010 revealed that gastrointestinal adverse effects were twice as likely for users of hydroxycitric acid. The use of HCA is contraindicated in people with colitis or inflammatory bowel disease.

=== Potential for liver damage ===
A 2024 review indicated that consuming foods or dietary supplements containing hydroxycitric acid, such as Garcinia products, may cause liver disease.
