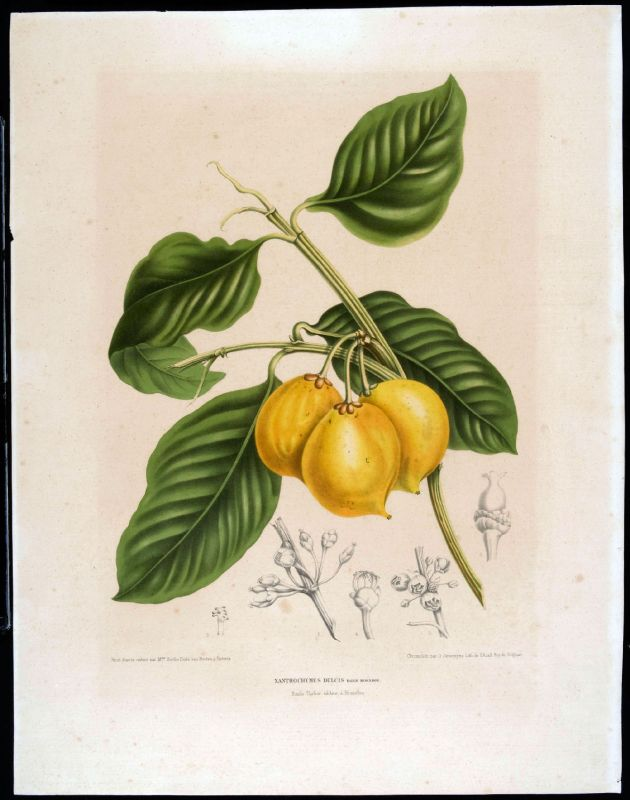

Conservation status
- Least Concern (IUCN 3.1)

Scientific classification
- Kingdom: Plantae
- Clade: Tracheophytes
- Clade: Angiosperms
- Clade: Eudicots
- Clade: Rosids
- Order: Malpighiales
- Family: Clusiaceae
- Genus: Garcinia
- Species: G. dulcis

Binomial name
- Garcinia dulcis (Roxb.) Kurz

Synonyms
- Garcinia andamanica King; Garcinia andamanica var. pubescens King; Garcinia cambodgiensis Vesque; Garcinia elliptica Choisy; Garcinia vilersiana Pierre; Stalagmitis dulcis (Roxb.) Cambess.; Stalagmitis elliptica G.Don; Stalagmitis javanensis (Blume) Spach; Xanthochymus dulcis Roxb.; Xanthochymus javanensis Blume

= Garcinia dulcis =

Species of tree

Garcinia dulcis is a species of tropical fruit tree native to the tropical Asia, ranging from northeastern India, to Indochina, Peninsular Malaysia, the Philippines, Borneo, Java, the Lesser Sunda Islands, Sulawesi, the Maluku Islands), New Guinea, and Queensland (Australia). It was domesticated early and spread inland into mainland Asia. It is commonly known as mundu or munu in Indonesia and Malaysia, baniti or taklang-anak in the Philippines, and maphuut or ma phut in Thailand. In English, it is sometimes known as yellow mangosteen, although that name is used for several other species as well.

The tree is harvested from the wild as a local source of food, medicine or dyeing material and is sometimes cultivated for its fruit, which is occasionally sold locally. Garcinia dulcis is not grown commercially.

The species was first described as Xanthochymus dulcis by William Roxburgh in 1820. In 1874 Wilhelm Sulpiz Kurz placed the species in genus Garcinia as G. dulcis.

== Description ==
Garcinia dulcis is an evergreen tree with horizontal branches and a dense, pyramidal crown. It can grow up to 15 metres tall and has a short, straight trunk, which can develop to a size of 30 cm in diameter. The tree grows best in areas where annual daytime temperatures are within the range of 22–30 °C and is well adapted to shade and humid conditions. Flowering usually occurs twice a year after long periods of drought.

== Uses ==
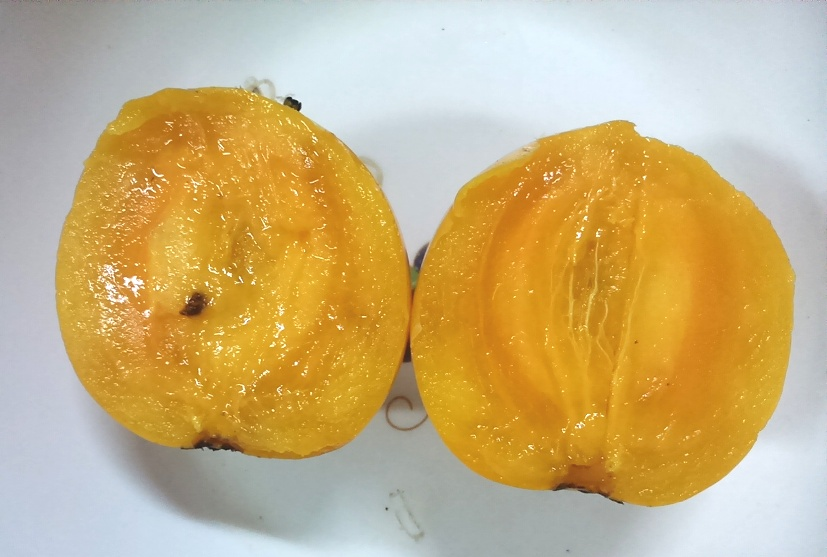
Cross section of Garcinia dulcis fruit

The orange coloured fruits can be eaten fresh; they contain a sour, juicy pulp, which can be preserved into jam. Green dye can be obtained from the bark, when mixed with indigo it gives a brown colour which is used to dye mats. From the unripe fruits a yellow dye, called gamboge, can be extracted, but is considered inferior to other dyes from members of the same genus like Garcinia xanthochymus. Garcinia dulcis also has medicinal purposes; it can be used for the treatment of wounds or scurvy. Testing on rats has indicated that the fruit's rind could have use as a treatment for metabolic syndrome.

== See also ==
- Garcinia binucao
- Garcinia gummi-gutta
- Garcinia morella
