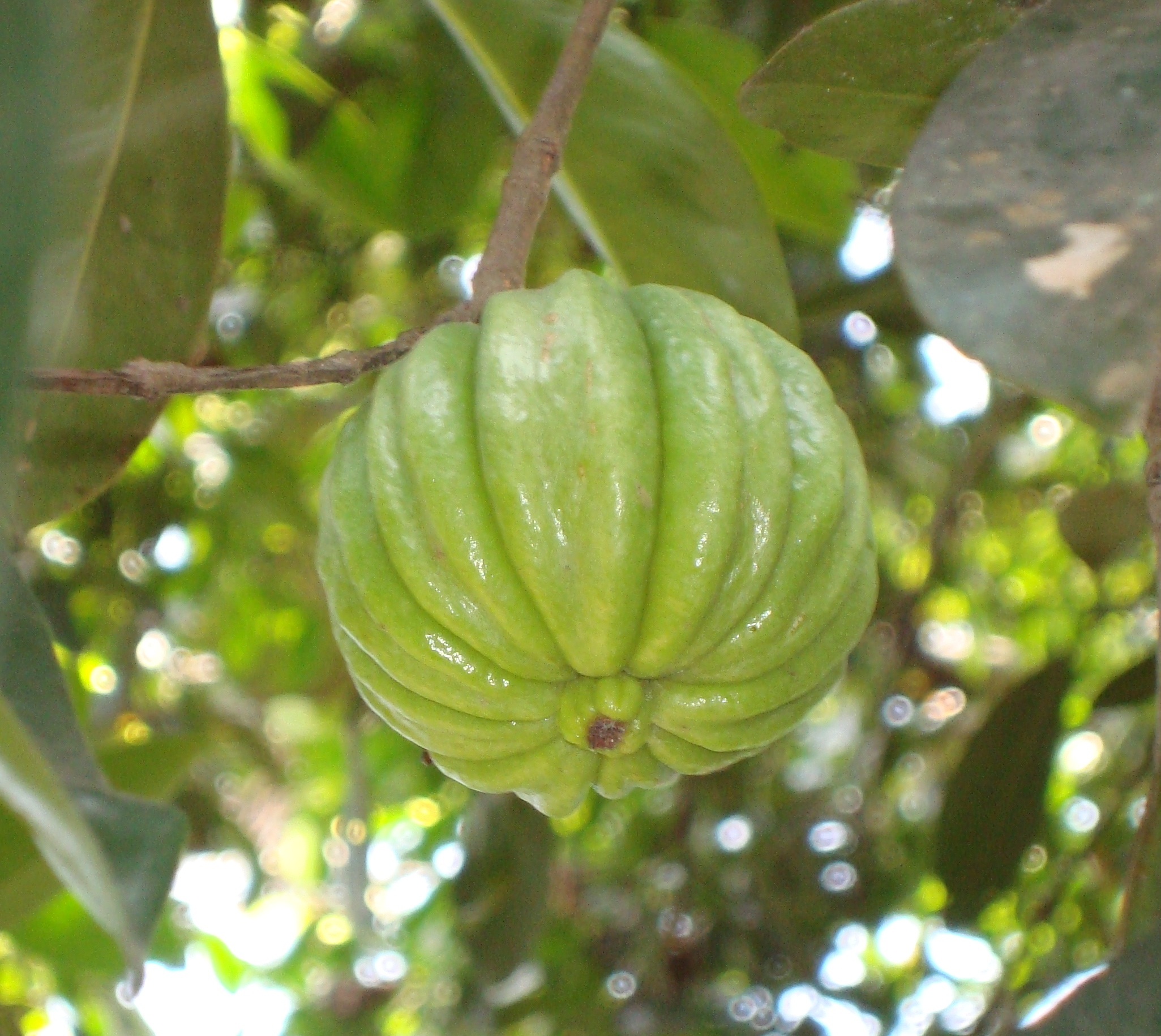

Conservation status
- Least Concern (IUCN 3.1)

Scientific classification
- Kingdom: Plantae
- Clade: Embryophytes
- Clade: Tracheophytes
- Clade: Spermatophytes
- Clade: Angiosperms
- Clade: Eudicots
- Clade: Rosids
- Order: Malpighiales
- Family: Clusiaceae
- Genus: Garcinia
- Species: G. gummi-gutta

Binomial name
- Garcinia gummi-gutta (L.) N.Robson

Synonyms
- Cambogia gemmi-gutta L.; Cambogia gutta L.; Garcinia cambogia Desr.; Garcinia gutta Roxb. ex Wall.; Mangostana cambogia Gaertn.

= Garcinia gummi-gutta =

Species of flowering plant

Garcinia gummi-gutta is a tropical species of Garcinia native to India. Common names include Garcinia cambogia (a former scientific name), as well as brindle berry, and Malabar tamarind. It is a tree which grows up to 20 metres tall. The fruit looks like a small pumpkin and is green to pale yellow in color. The species is native to the central and southern Western Ghats of Goa, Karnataka, Kerala, Maharashtra, and Tamil Nadu states in southwestern India. It grows in lowland and montane moist evergreen forest, generally as an understorey tree along stream banks, up to 1,800 metres (5,910 ft) elevation. It has been introduced or is in cultivation elsewhere in India and Southeast Asia.

Although it has received considerable media attention purporting its effects on weight loss, there are reports of liver toxicity associated with the Hydroxycut commercial preparation containing the fruit extract, with clinical evidence indicating it has no significant effect on weight loss.

== Cultivation ==
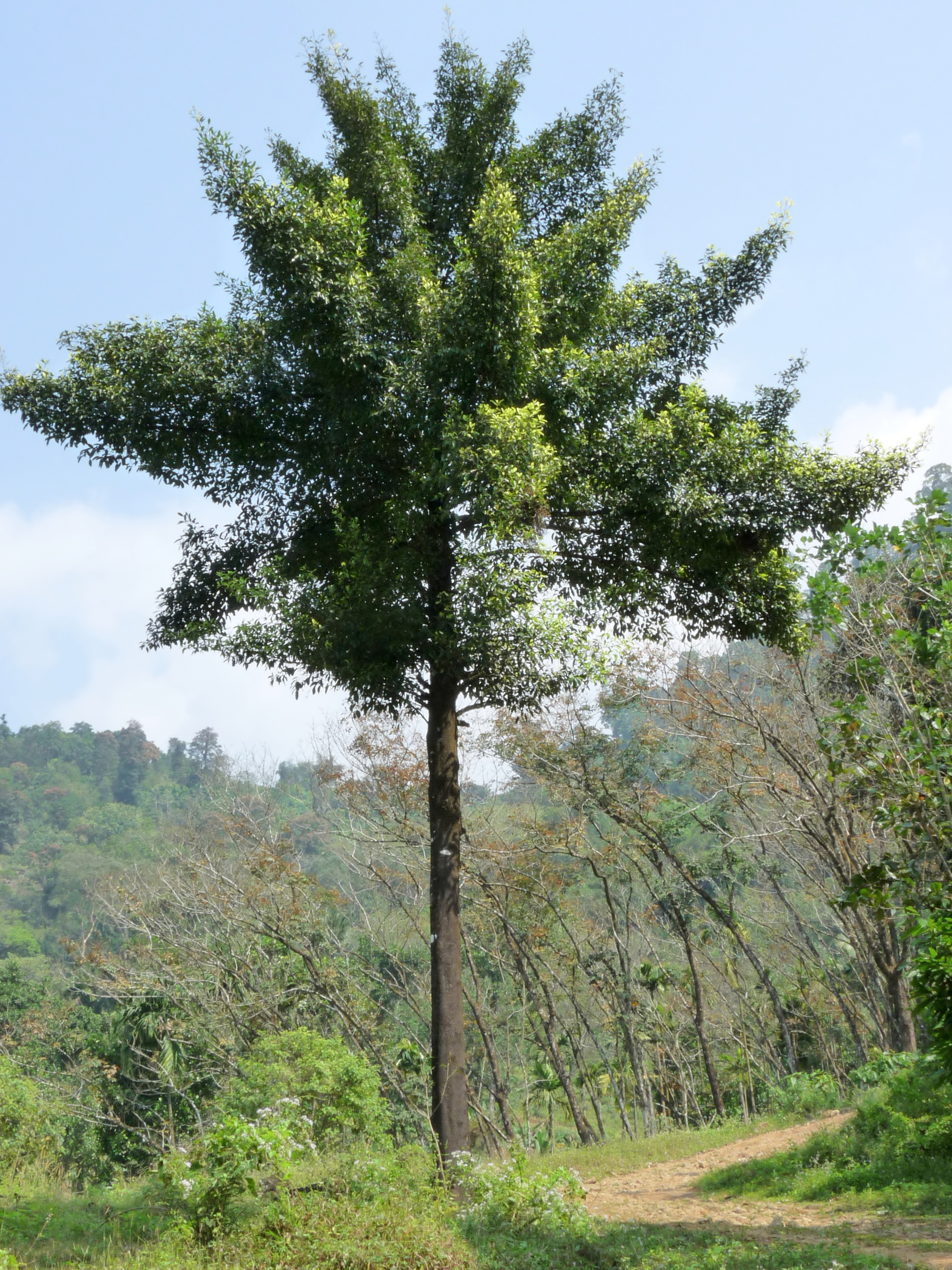
In Kerala, India

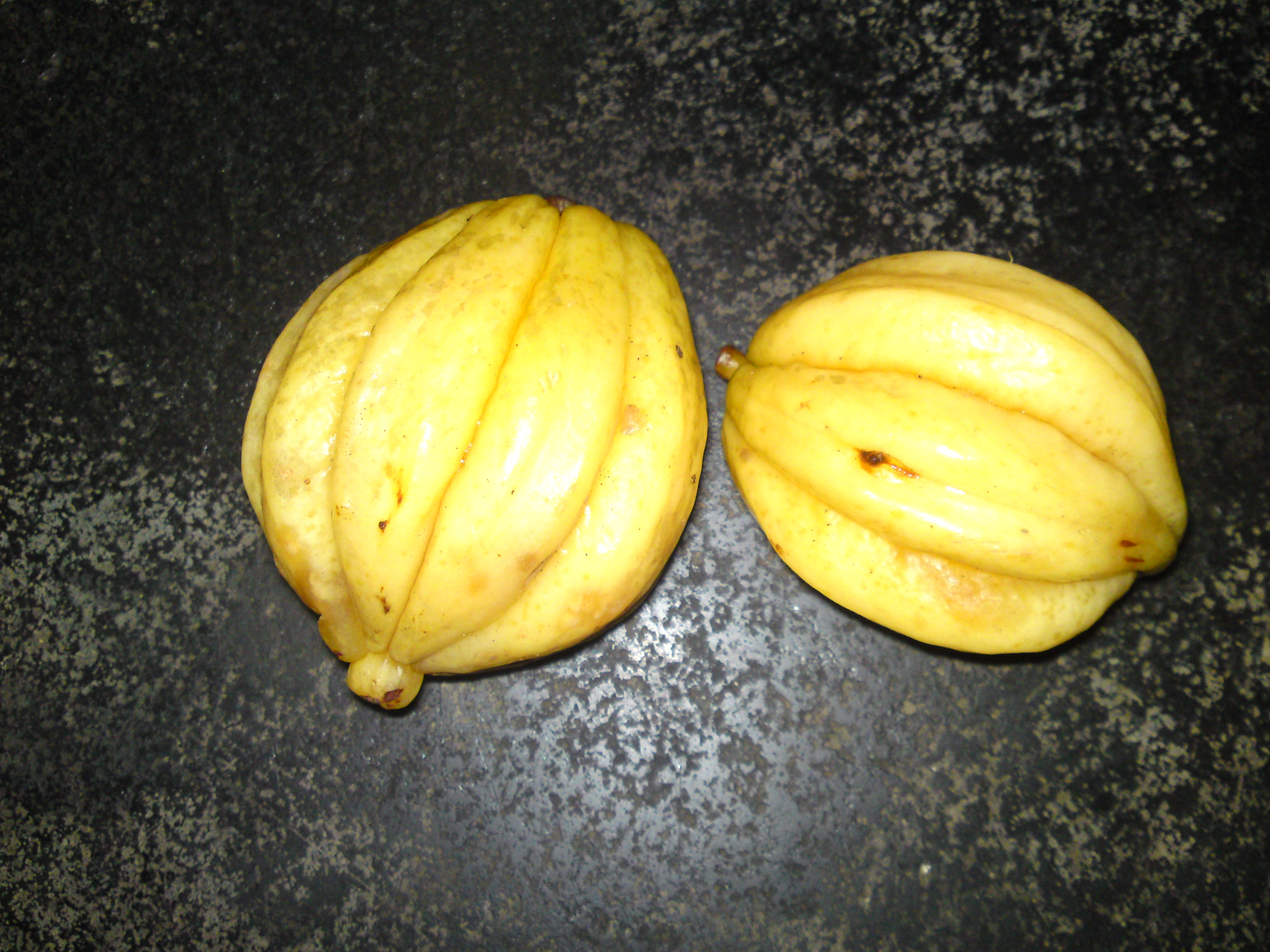
Ripe fruit

Garcinia gummi-gutta is grown for its fruit in Southeast Asia and South Asia. Garcinia gummi-gutta is one of several closely related Garcinia species from the plant family Clusiaceae. With thin skin and deep vertical lobes, the fruit of G. gummi-gutta and related species range from about the size of an orange to that of a grapefruit; G. gummi-gutta looks more like a small yellowish, greenish, or sometimes reddish pumpkin. The color can vary considerably. When the rinds are dried and cured in preparation for storage and extraction, they are dark brown or black in color.

== Phytochemicals ==
Although few high-quality studies have been done to define the composition of the fruit, its phytochemical content includes hydroxycitric acid which is extractable and developed as a dietary supplement. Other compounds identified in the fruit include the polyphenols, luteolin, and kaempferol.

== Common names ==
In the Malabar Coast, it is known as kudam puli and in Tamil speaking areas of Sri Lanka and India, it is called goraka.

== Weight loss claims ==
In late 2012, a United States celebrity doctor, Dr. Oz, promoted Garcinia cambogia extract as "an exciting breakthrough in natural weight loss". Dr. Oz's endorsements of dietary supplements have often led to a substantial increase in consumer purchases of the promoted products, despite having no or little scientific evidence of efficacy.

While it has received considerable media attention purporting impact on weight loss, the evidence for Garcinia cambogia supports no clear effect, while gastrointestinal adverse events were two-fold more common over the placebo in a 2011 meta-analysis, indicating the extract may be unsafe for human consumption. Adverse events associated with use of such supplements ("side effects") — especially, liver toxicity, as well as gastrointestinal issues — led to one preparation being withdrawn from the market.

=== Adverse effects ===
In addition to possible liver damage, hydroxycitric acid can cause dry mouth, nausea, gastrointestinal discomfort, and headaches.

=== Drug interactions ===
There is potential for Garcinia cambogia to interfere with prescription medications, including those used to treat people with diabetes, asthma, and clotting disorders.

== Culinary ==
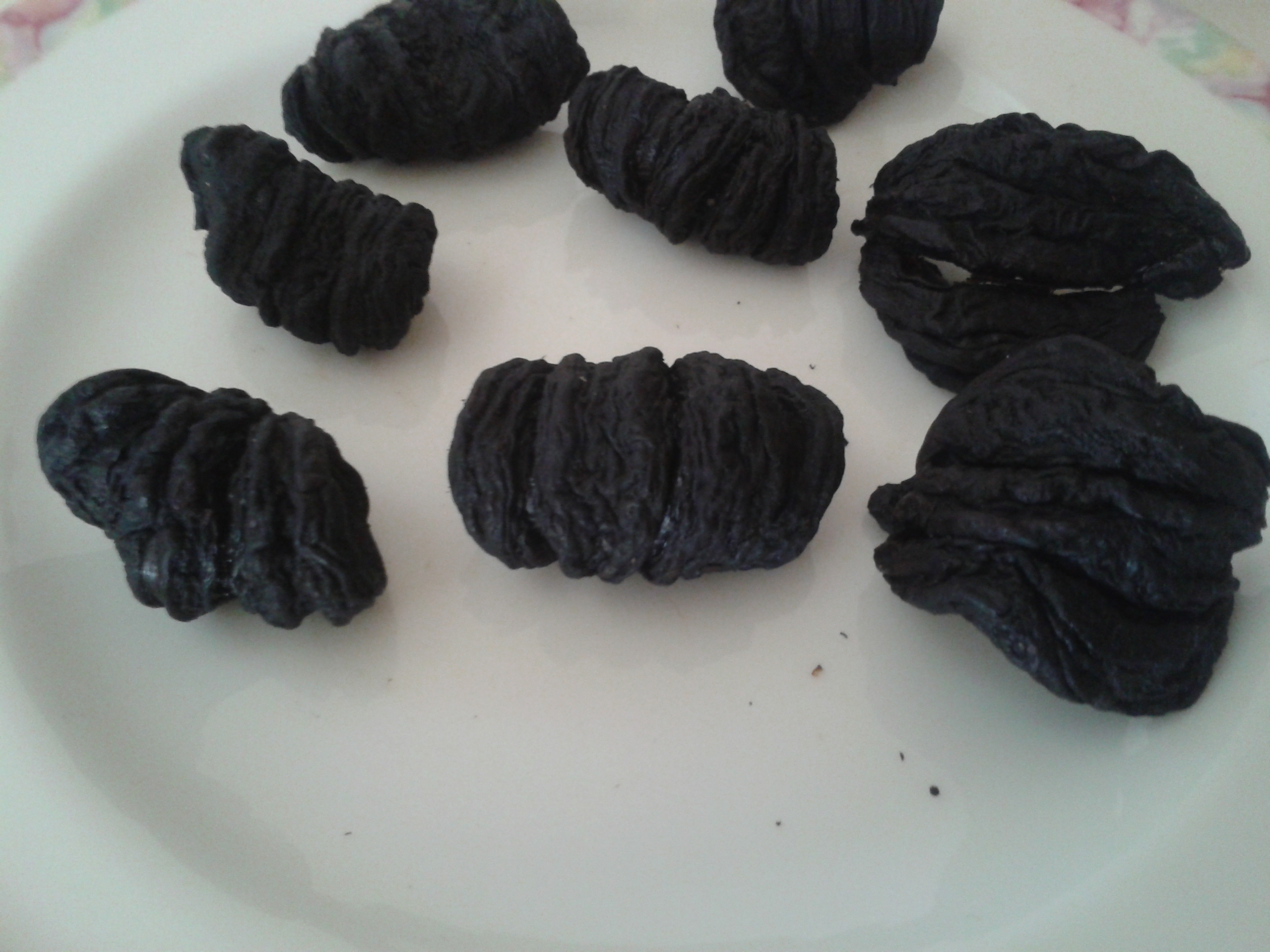
When the fruit is sun dried for several days, it becomes black with a shrivelled body.

Garcinia gummi-gutta is used in cooking, including in the preparation of curries to add a sour flavor. The fruit rind and extracts of Garcinia species are used in many traditional recipes used in food preparation in Southeast Asian countries. In the Indian Ayurvedic medicine, "sour" flavors are said to activate digestion. The extract and rind of G. gummi-gutta is a curry condiment in India. It is an essential souring ingredient in the southern Thai variant of kaeng som, a sour curry. In southwest India, the Coorg people make a vinegar known as kachampuli from the species' fruit.

== Gallery ==
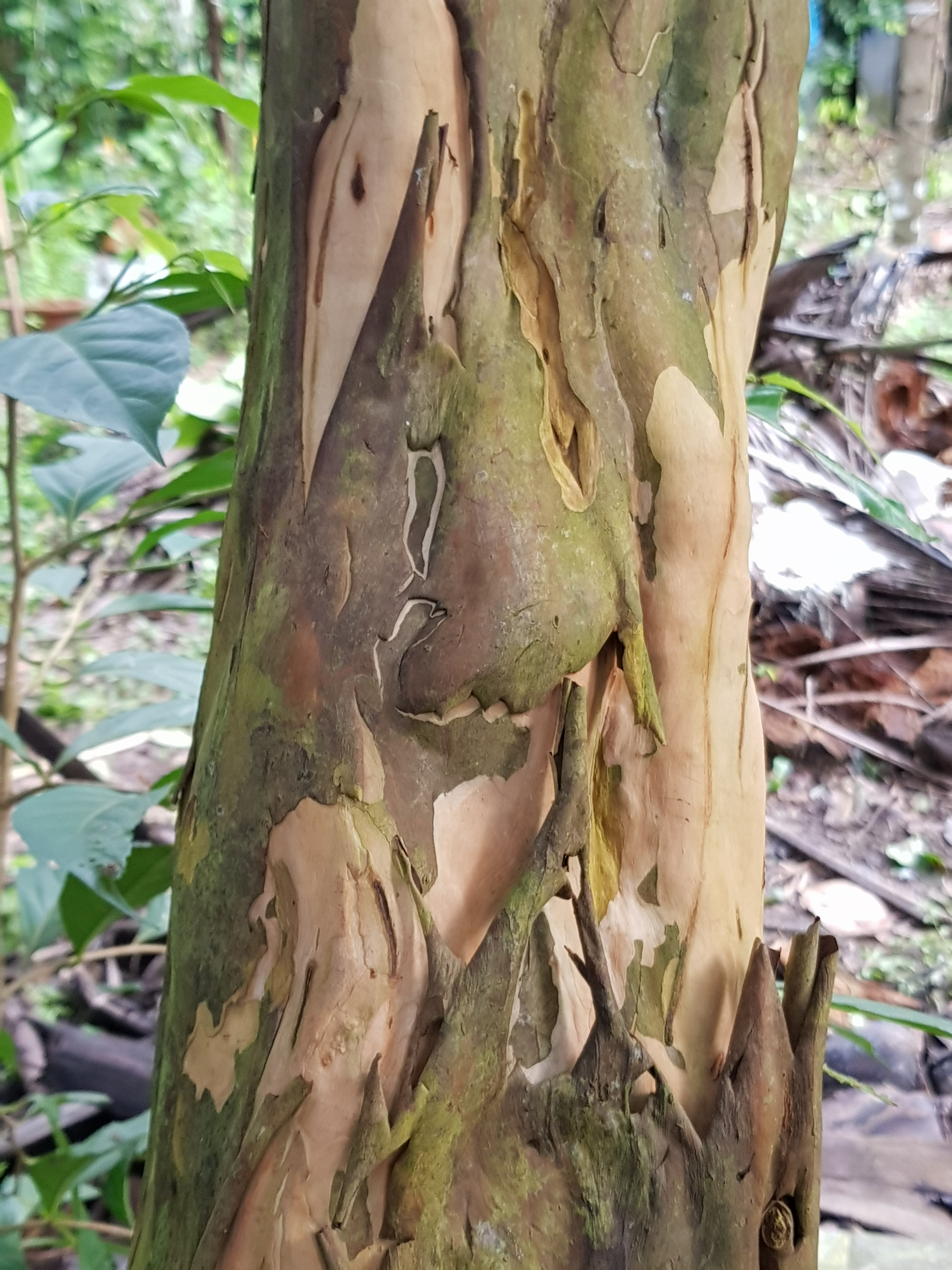
Bark

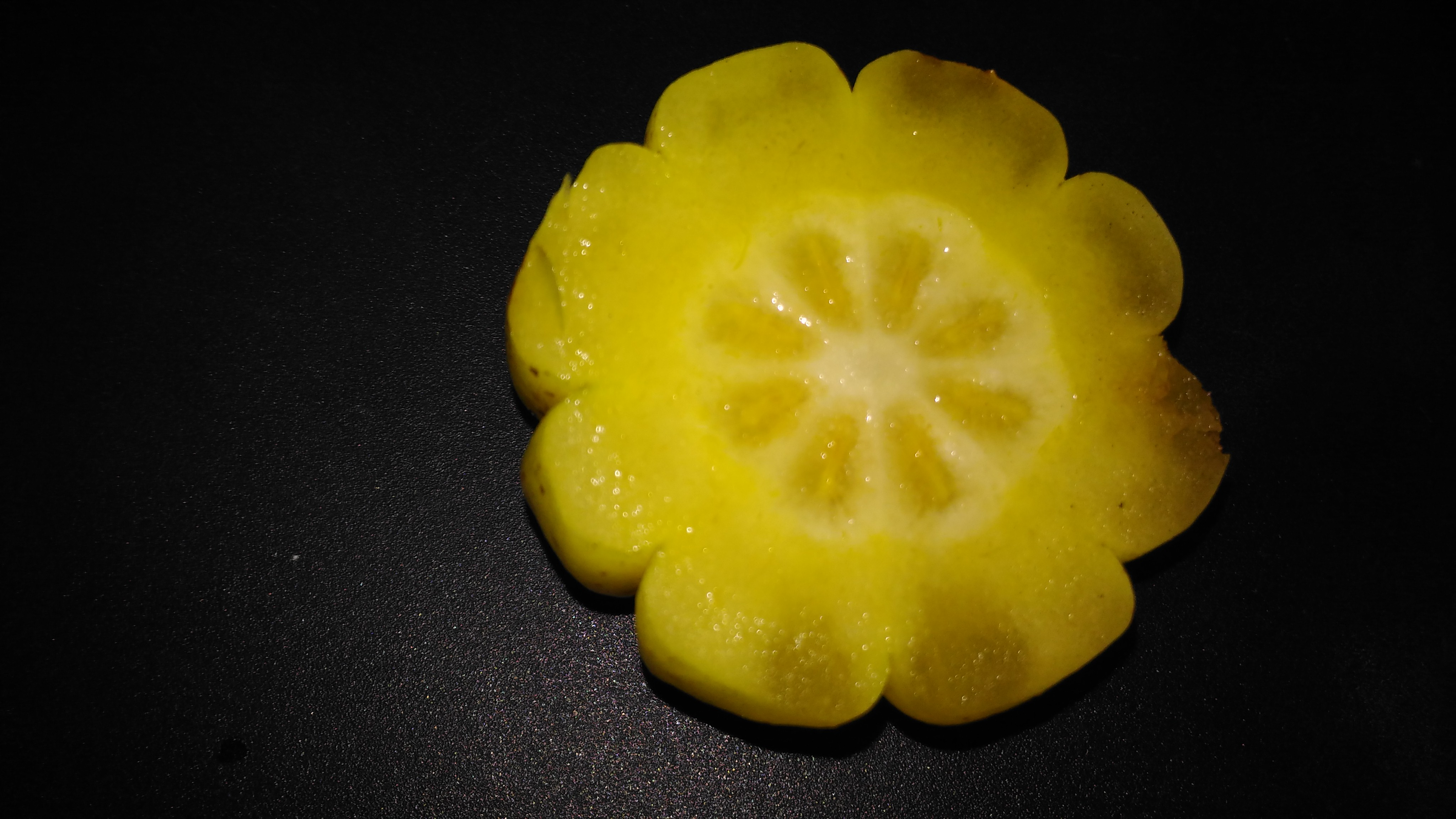
Cross section

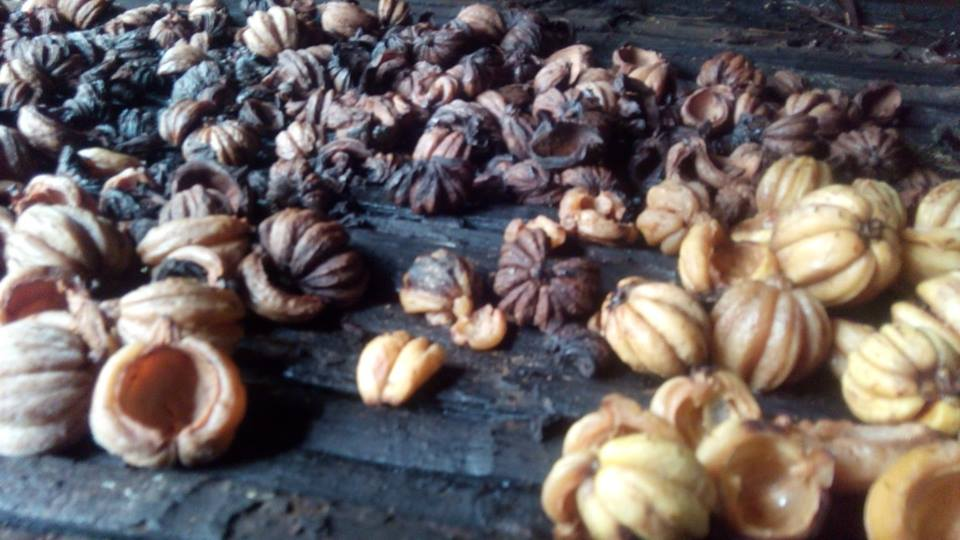
Drying in smoke

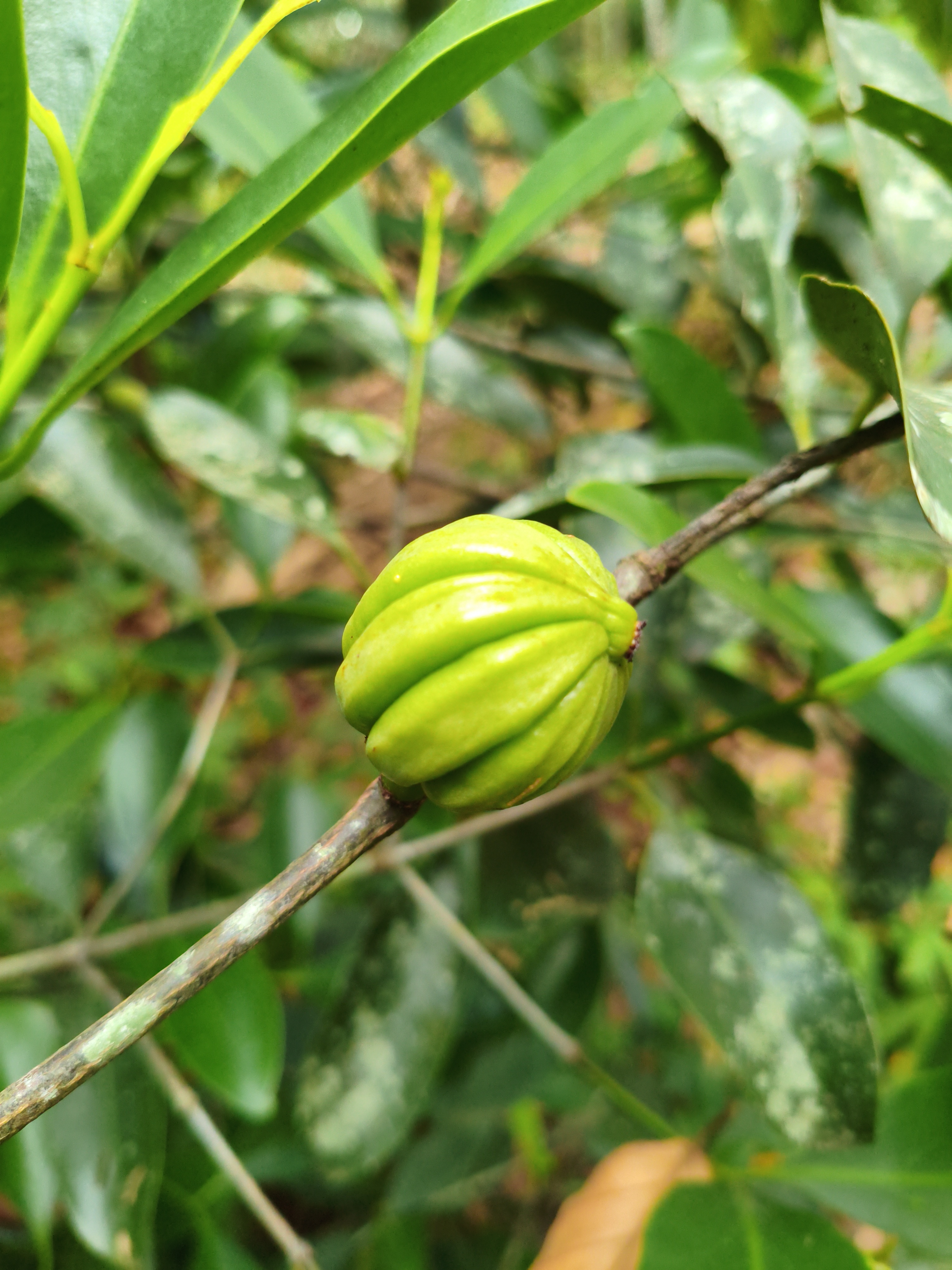
Young fruit

== See also ==
- Garcinia binucao
- Garcinia dulcis
- Garcinia morella
