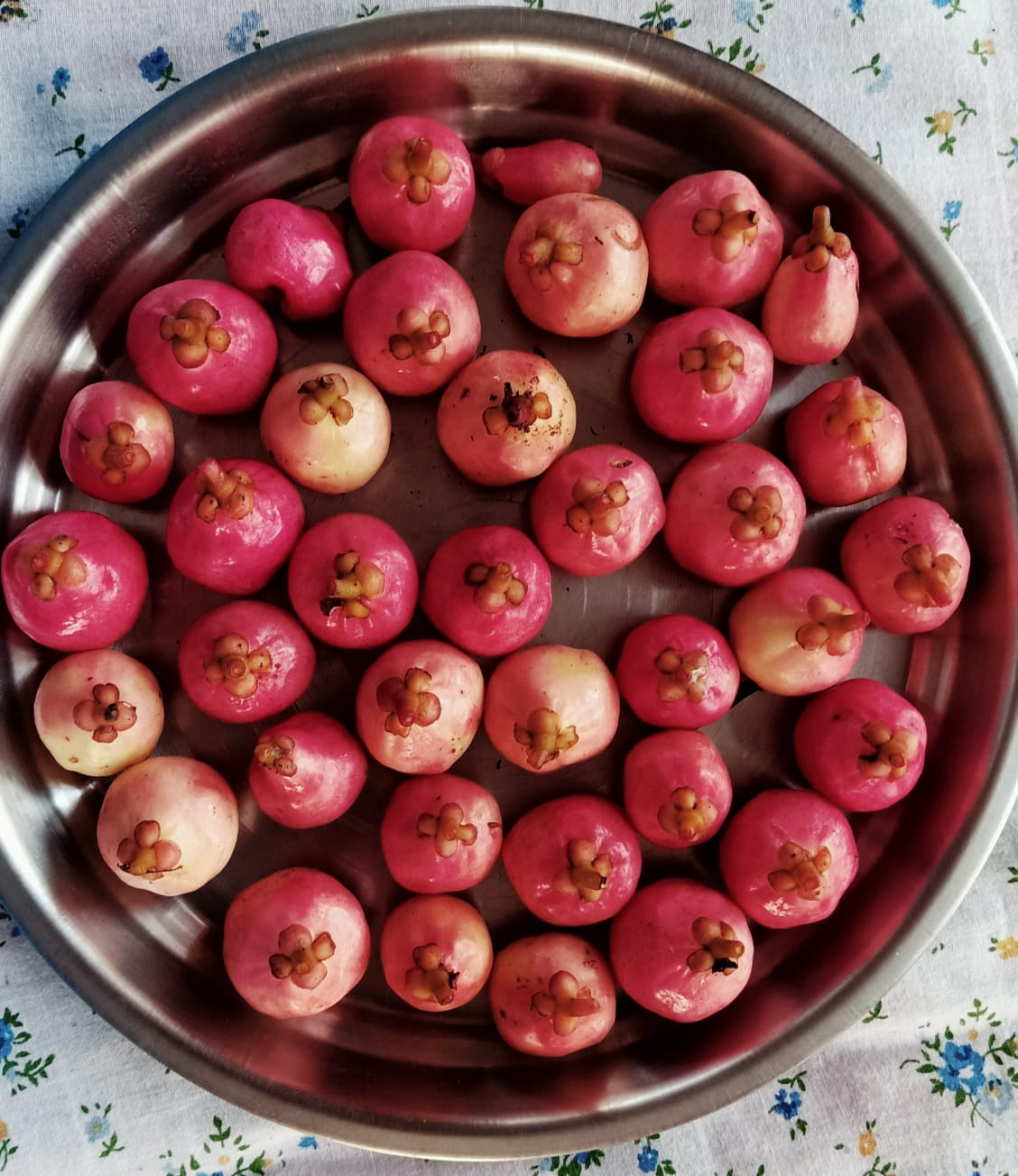
- Garcinia lanceifolia fruit

Conservation status
- Least Concern (IUCN 3.1)

Scientific classification
- Kingdom: Plantae
- Clade: Tracheophytes
- Clade: Angiosperms
- Clade: Eudicots
- Clade: Rosids
- Order: Malpighiales
- Family: Clusiaceae
- Genus: Garcinia
- Species: G. lanceifolia

Binomial name
- Garcinia lanceifolia Roxb.

Varieties
- Garcinia lanceifolia var. lanceifolia; Garcinia lanceifolia var. oxyphylla (Planch. & Triana) Laness.

Synonyms
- Synonyms of var. lanceifolia: Garcinia gracilis Pierre; Stalagmitis lanceifolia G.Don; Synonyms of var. oxyphylla: Garcinia oxyphylla Planch. & Triana

= Garcinia lanceifolia =

Fruit tree

Garcinia lanceifolia is an endemic medicinal evergreen plant with edible fruit native to northeastern India (Arunachal Pradesh, Assam, Meghalaya, Nagaland, and Mizoram), Bangladesh, and Indochina (Cambodia, Laos, Myanmar, Thailand, and Vietnam). It is small evergreen tree growing up to 10 metres tall with glabrous leaves. It is native to moist evergreen subtropical and tropical hill forests from 400 to 1,200 metres elevation, where it is locally common. It typically grows as an understorey plant in the dense shade of other trees. It is used for food and medicine.

It is locally known as 'Rupohi Thekera' (ৰূপহী থেকেৰা) or 'Kon Thekera' (কণ- থেকেৰা) in Assamese, Chengkek in Mizo, Thisuru in Garo, Dieng-soh-jadu in Khasi and Khanada.

Two varieties are accepted.

- Garcinia lanceifolia var. lanceifolia – eastern Himalayas, Assam, Bangladesh, and Indochina
- Garcinia lanceifolia var. oxyphylla (Planch. & Triana) Laness. – Assam

It has been used by various ethnic communities across North-Eastern India for treatment of dysentery, dyspepsia, and jaundice. It is also used as pickles in various North Eastern Indian cuisines.
