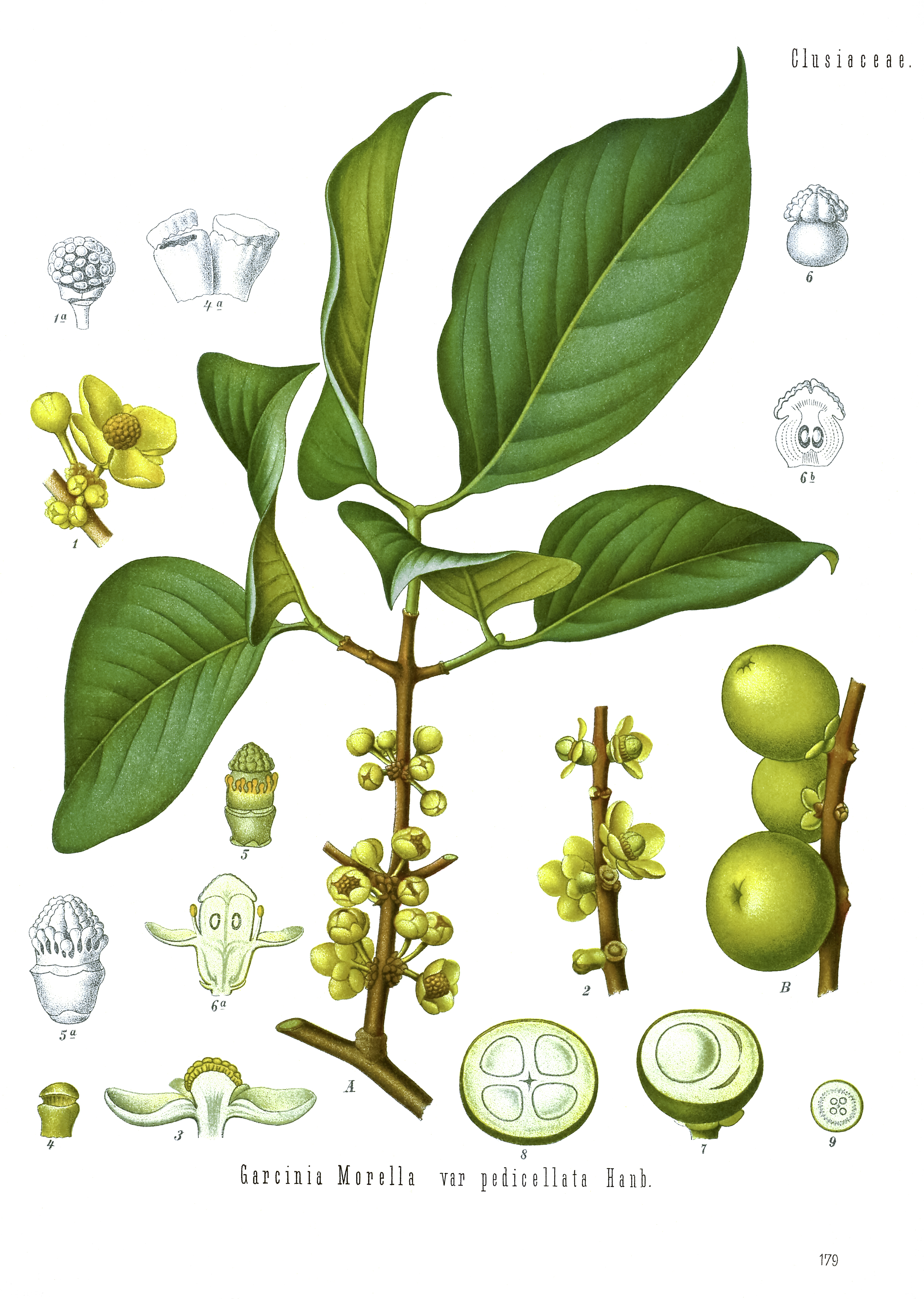

Conservation status
- Least Concern (IUCN 3.1)

Scientific classification
- Kingdom: Plantae
- Clade: Tracheophytes
- Clade: Angiosperms
- Clade: Eudicots
- Clade: Rosids
- Order: Malpighiales
- Family: Clusiaceae
- Genus: Garcinia
- Species: G. cambogioides

Binomial name
- Garcinia cambogioides (Murray) Headland

Varieties
- Garcinia cambogioides var. cambogioides; Garcinia cambogioides var. cuspida (A.Begum, Borthakur & J.Sarma) T.K.Paul; Garcinia cambogioides var. mucrona (A.Begum, Borthakur & J.Sarma) T.K.Paul; Garcinia cambogioides var. pictoria (Roxb.) Shameer & N.Mohanan

Synonyms
- Hebradendron cambogioides (Murray) Graham; Stalagmitis cambogioides Murray; synonyms of var. cambogioides: Garcinia morella (Gaertn.) Desr.; Mangostana morella Gaertn.; Stalagmitis cambogia Pers.; synonyms of var. cuspida: Garcinia morella var. cuspida A.Begum, Borthakur & J.Sarma; synonyms of var. mucrona: Garcinia morella var. mucrona A.Begum, Borthakur & J.Sarma; synonyms of var. pictoria: Garcinia pictoria Roxb.; Hebradendron pictorium (Roxb.) Royle

= Garcinia cambogioides =

Species of flowering plant

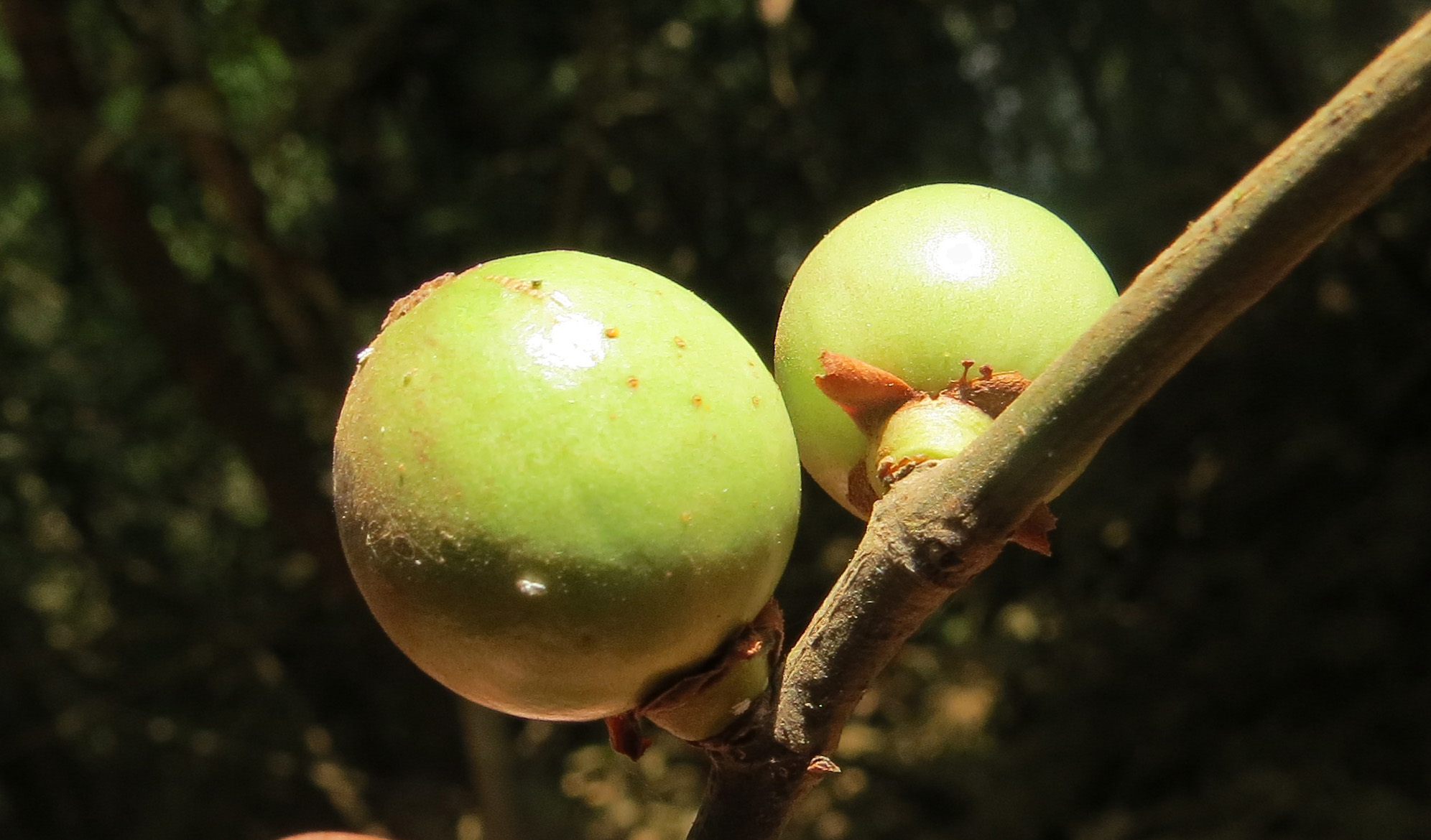
Fruit

Garcinia cambogioides is a species of flowering plant in the family Clusiaceae. It is native to southwestern and northeastern India (Arunachal Pradesh, Assam, and neighboring states), Bangladesh, and Sri Lanka.

== Common names ==
- Assamese: Kũzi Thekera (কুঁঁজী ঠেকেৰা)
- English: gamboge (Sri Lanka), gamboge (India)
- Tamil: iravasinni (இரேவற்சின்னி), makki
- Tulu: aradāḷa
- Malayalam: iravi, chigiri
- Kannada: devana huli, jirigehuli, murina huli, ponpuli, 'dirakala hannu'
- Sinhalese: kokatiya, gokatiya, goraka (ගොරකා)
- Sanskrit: svarṇakṣīrī (स्वर्णक्षीरी)
- Cebuano: batuan

== Description ==
Trees are up to 12 m tall. Bark is smooth, and dark brown in color; blaze white.

Leaves simple, opposite, decussate; petiole 0.6-1.5 cm long, canaliculate, sheathing at base, glabrous; lamina 6.5-15 x 3.5-8 cm, usually elliptic, sometimes narrow obovate, apex acute to acuminate, base attenuate; coriaceous or subcoriaceous, glabrous; secondary_nerves 6-8 pairs; tertiary_nerves obscure.

Flowers show inflorescence and are dioecious; male flowers in fascicles, axillary; female flowers larger than male, solitary, axillary.

== Varieties ==
Four varieties are accepted.

- Garcinia cambogioides var. cambogioides – southwestern and northeastern India, Sri Lanka, and Bangladesh
- Garcinia cambogioides var. cuspida (A.Begum, Borthakur & J.Sarma) T.K.Paul – Assam
- Garcinia cambogioides var. mucrona (A.Begum, Borthakur & J.Sarma) T.K.Paul – Assam
- Garcinia cambogioides var. pictoria (Roxb.) Shameer & N.Mohanan – southwestern India

== Uses ==
Ripe fruits can be eaten but they are very acidic. Just like other garcinia varieties such as kokum (which is prevalent in the Indian west coast) or garcinia pedunculata, the fruit can be preserved by slicing into thin pieces and then drying under sun. It can be made into pickles. Bodos cook the unripe fruit as vegetable with fish. A chutney can be made by boiling the fruit. In Assam, dried and preserved slices are added to black green pulses to make a popular slightly acidic curry. Dried up fruit slices are valued as a traditional remedy for dysentery. In Ayurveda the fruits are used in the treatment of dysentery, gastritis, etc. and is said to have anti inflammatory properties. When the bark is cut it exudes a yellow resin called gamboge that is used in food, paints and medicines. It can be used as a rootstock for the mangosteen (Garcinia mangostana).

In Malnad region of Karnataka, Tirtahalli and Chikkamagalore this is widely used in name of 'odduli', especially in fish recipes. Odduli is prepared by boiling the fruit to get a thick black liquid which can be stored for years without adding preservatives.

== See also ==
- Garcinia binucao
- Garcinia dulcis
- Garcinia gummi-gutta
