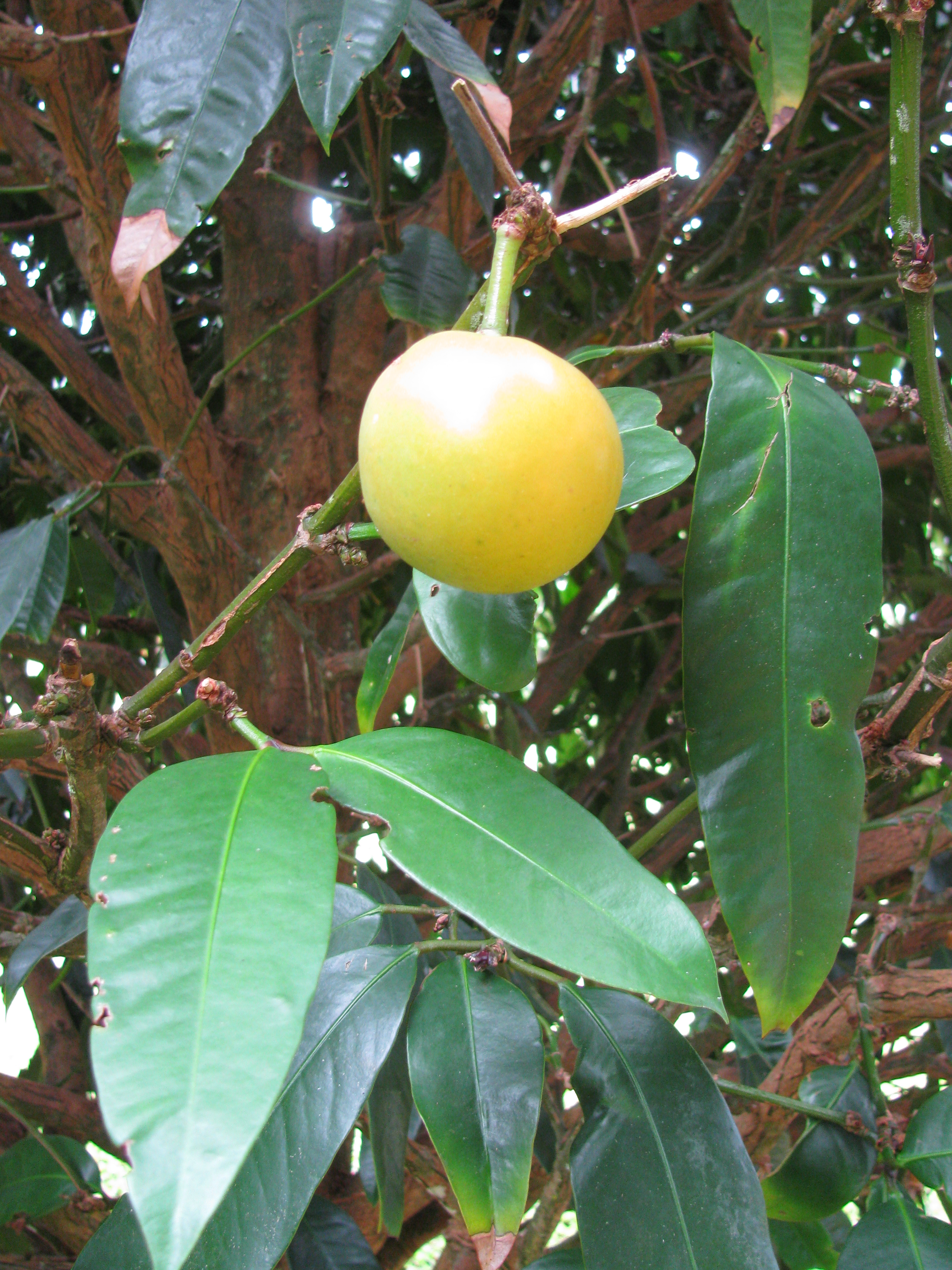

Conservation status
- Least Concern (IUCN 3.1)

Scientific classification
- Kingdom: Plantae
- Clade: Embryophytes
- Clade: Tracheophytes
- Clade: Spermatophytes
- Clade: Angiosperms
- Clade: Eudicots
- Clade: Rosids
- Order: Malpighiales
- Family: Clusiaceae
- Genus: Garcinia
- Species: G. xanthochymus

Binomial name
- Garcinia xanthochymus Hook.f. ex T.Anderson

Synonyms
- Garcinia pictoria (Roxb.) Dunn, nom. illeg. homonym. post.; Garcinia roxburghii Kurz, nom. illeg.; Garcinia tinctoria (Choisy) W.Wight; Stalagmitis pictoria (Roxb.) G.Don; Stalagmitis tinctoria (Choisy) Paxton, orth. var.; Xanthochymus pictorius Roxb.; Xanthochymus tinctorius Choisy

= Garcinia xanthochymus =

Species of flowering plant

Garcinia xanthochymus, the false mangosteen, gamboge, yellow mangosteen, Himalayan Garcinia, or sour mangosteen is a species of mangosteen native to India, Nepal, Bangladesh, Indochina, and southern China at elevations of 0 – 1400 meters. Plants are found growing in humid forests of valleys or on hills. It is locally known as defol (ডেফল) in Bengal, tepor tenga (টেপৰ টেঙা) in Assam, and heirangoi (হৈরাংগোই) in Manipur.

== Description ==
Tree growing up to 8–15 meters with gray brown bark. Leaves are oblong to lanceolate, 15.4-30.5 cm x (4-)6–12 cm. Petioles are robust 1.5-2.5 cm long. Flowers are greenish white, monoecious in a dense cluster of 4–10 with a diameter of 1.3 cm. Fruits are yellow 5 cm to 8.9 cm in diameter containing yellow flesh and around 5 seeds. Seeds are oblong or ovoid and brown. Plants bloom from March to May with fruits forming around August to November.

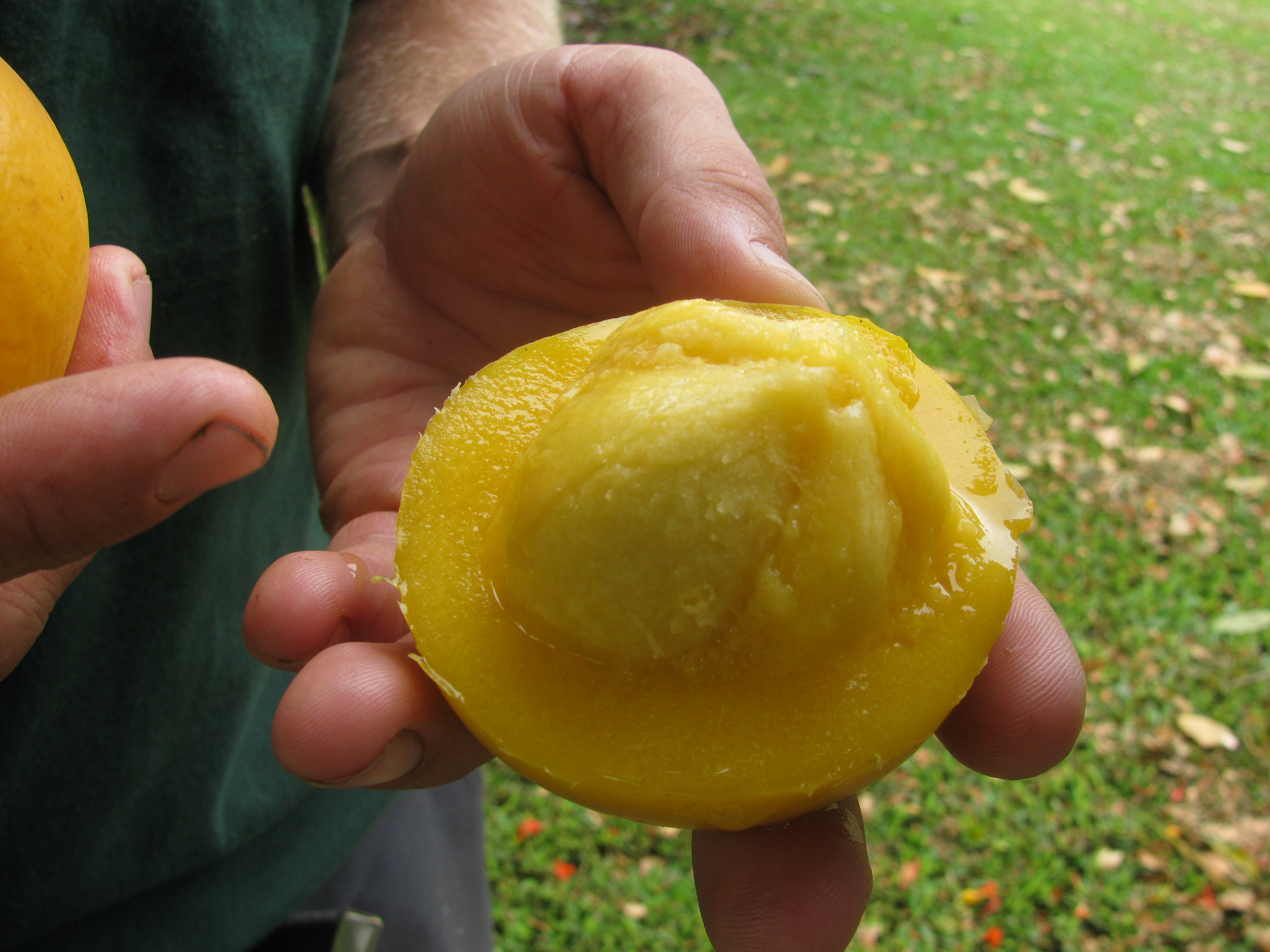
Fruit flesh

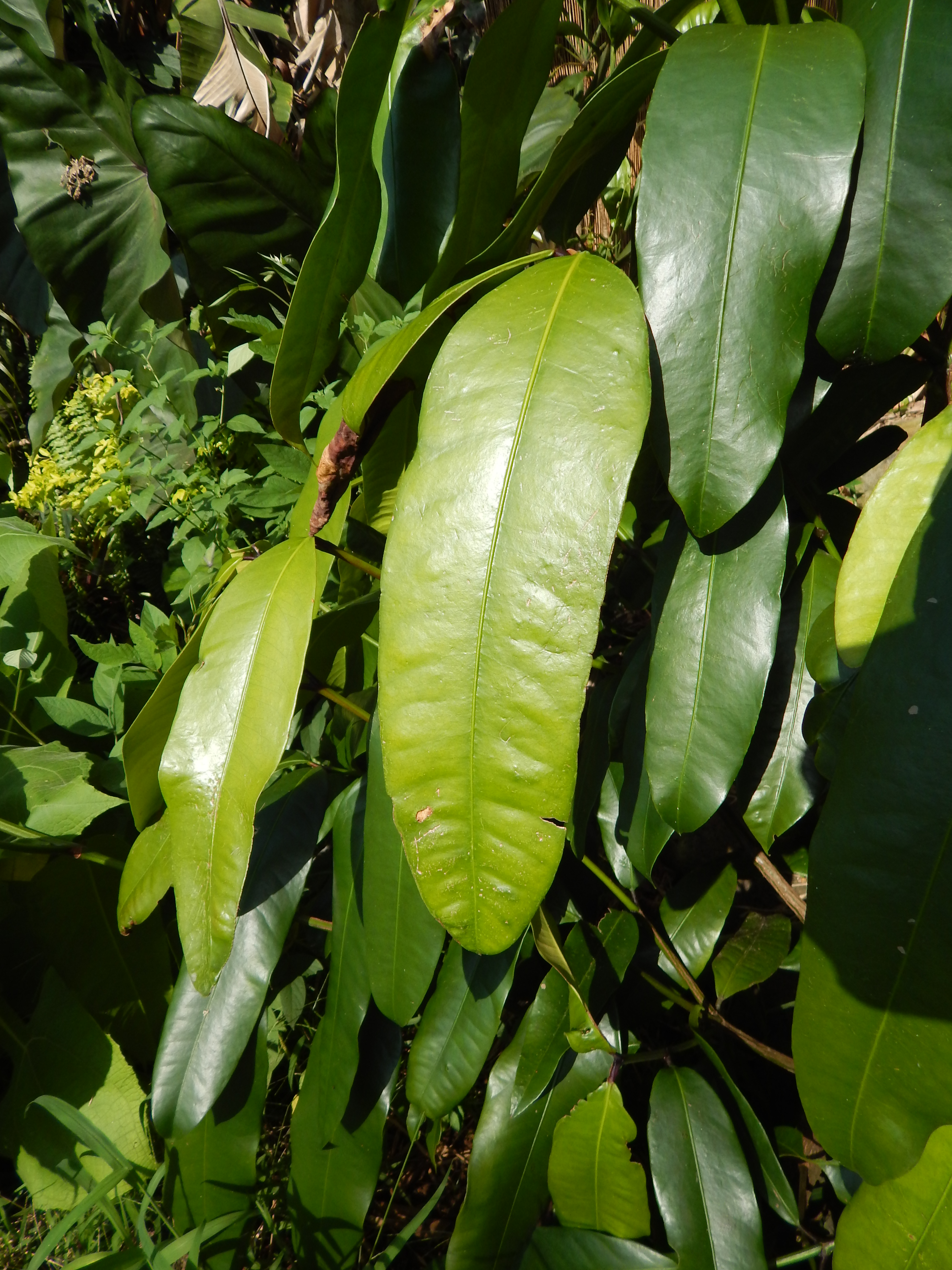
Leaves

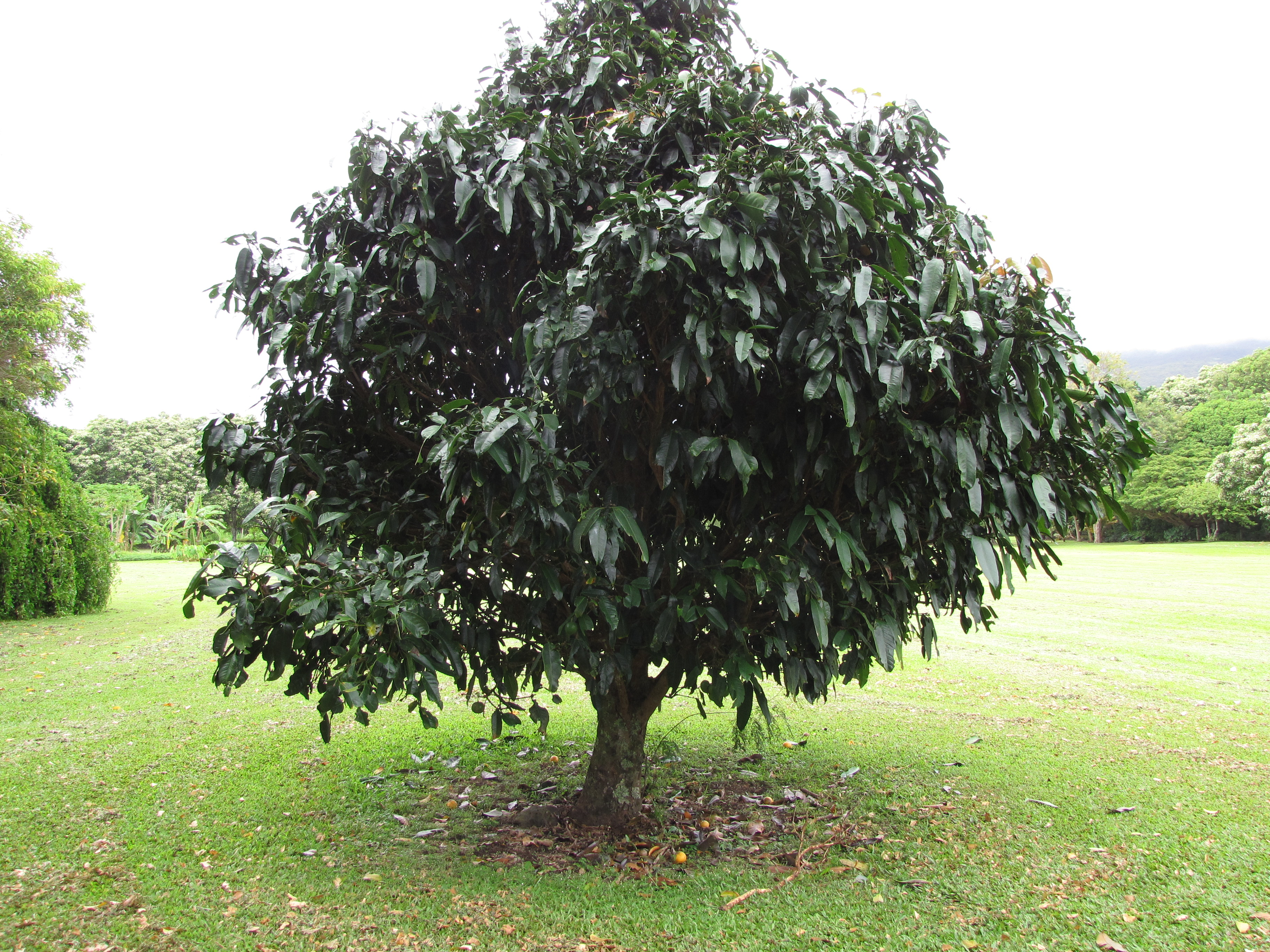
Plant

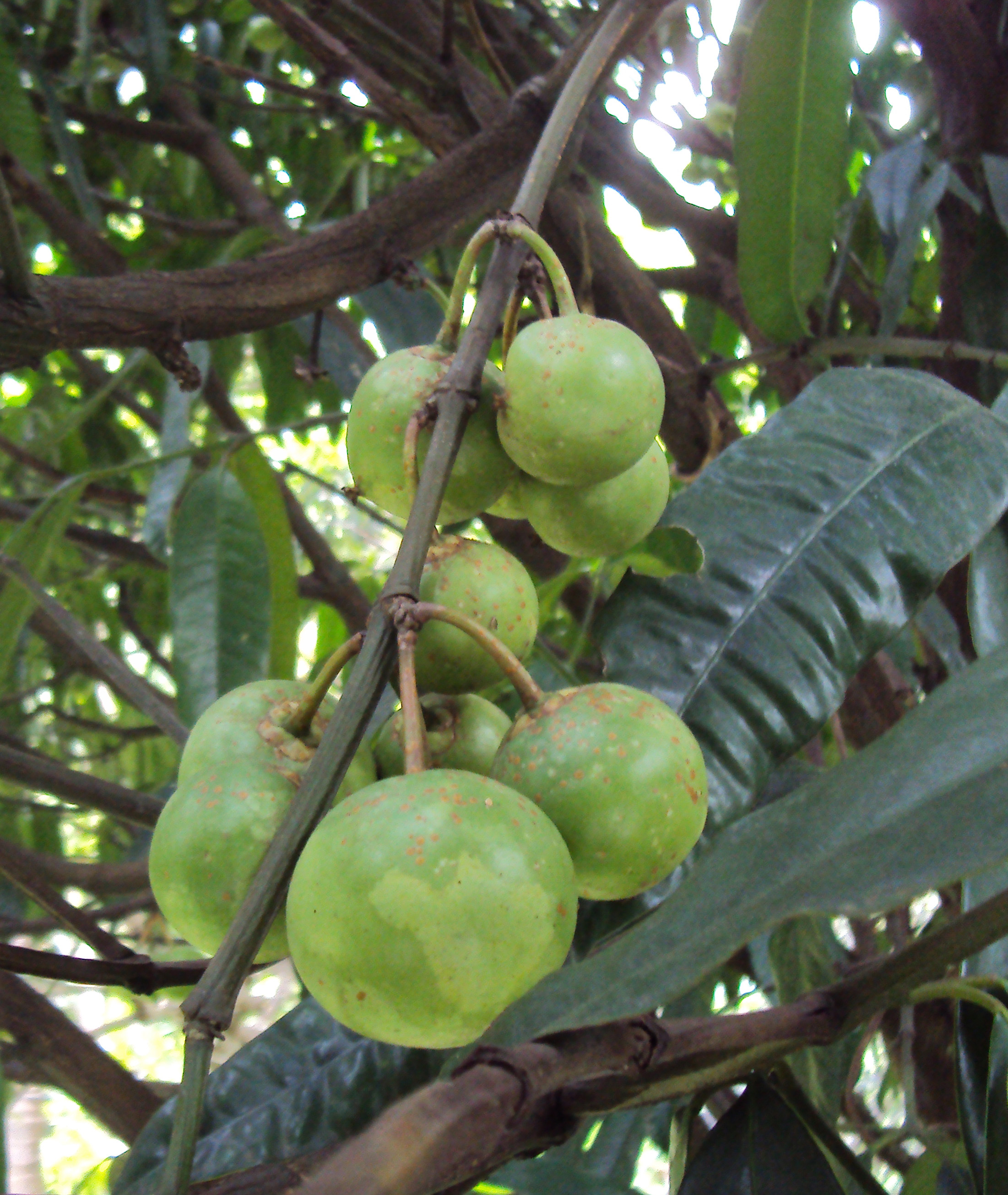
Immature fruits
