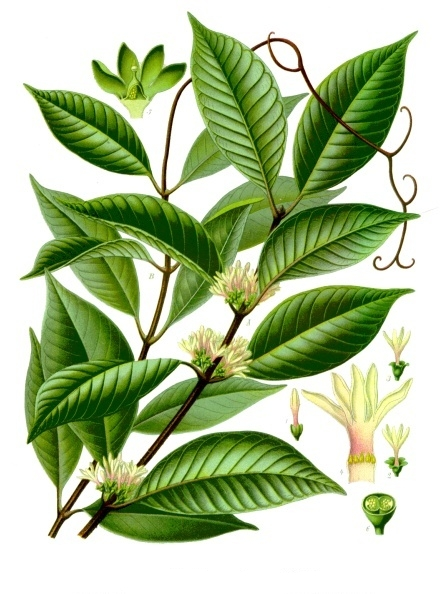
- Willughbeia coriacea

Scientific classification
- Kingdom: Plantae
- Clade: Tracheophytes
- Clade: Angiosperms
- Clade: Eudicots
- Clade: Asterids
- Order: Gentianales
- Family: Apocynaceae
- Subfamily: Rauvolfioideae
- Tribe: Willughbeieae
- Subtribe: Willughbeiinae; A.DC. in DC. & A.DC.
- Genus: Willughbeia; Roxb.

Type species
- Willughbeia edulis Roxb.

Synonyms
- Ancylocladus Wall.; Urnularia Stapf; Willughbeiopsis Rauschert

= Willughbeia =

Genus of plants

Willughbeia is a genus of plant in the family Apocynaceae, first described as a genus in 1820. It is native to Southeast Asia with a few species in the Indian Subcontinent. Several species have edible fruits enjoyed in many countries. Many species are vines with sticky latex.

== Taxonomy ==
The genus name Willughbeia commemorates Francis Willughby, an English ornithologist and ichthyologist.

== Species ==
The known extant species are:

1. Willughbeia angustifolia (Miq.) Markgr. - Nicobar Islands, Thailand, Malaysia, Indonesia
2. Willughbeia anomala Markgr. - Borneo, Mindanao
3. Willughbeia beccariana (Kuntze ex Pierre) K.Schum. - Borneo, Sulawesi
4. Willughbeia cirrhifera Abeyw. - Sri Lanka
5. Willughbeia coriacea Wall. & G.Don - Thailand, Malaysia, W Indonesia
6. Willughbeia edulis Roxb. - Assam, Bangladesh, Indochina, Nicobar Islands, W Malaysia
7. Willughbeia elmerii - Jatak
8. Willughbeia flavescens Dyer ex Hook.f. - Borneo, W Malaysia, Sumatra
9. Willughbeia gigantea (Boerl.) Markgr. - Sumatera, Borneo
10. Willughbeia grandiflora Dyer ex Hook.f. - Thailand, W Malaysia, Borneo
11. Willughbeia javanica Blume - Java
12. Willughbeia kontumensis Lý - Vietnam
13. Willughbeia lanceolata (Markgr.) Mabb. - Borneo
14. Willughbeia lunduensis Mabb. - Sarawak
15. Willughbeia oblonga Dyer ex Hook.f. - W Malaysia
16. Willughbeia ovatifolia (Stapf) Merr. - Sarawak
17. Willughbeia sarawacensis (Pierre) K.Schum. - Borneo, Palawan
18. Willughbeia tenuiflora Dyer ex Hook.f. - Thailand, W Malaysia, Sumatra

formerly included

1. Willughbeia acida, syn of Ambelania acida
2. Willughbeia borneensis, syn of Leuconotis anceps
3. Willughbeia cordata, syn of Saba comorensis
4. Willughbeia elliptifolia, syn of Melodinus orientalis
5. Willughbeia guianensis, syn of Pacouria guianensis
6. Willughbeia luzoniensis, syn of Melodinus orientalis
7. Willughbeia novoguineensis, syn of Melodinus australis
8. Willughbeia pauciflora, syn of Melodinus orientalis
9. Willughbeia petersiana, syn of Ancylobothrys petersiana
10. Willughbeia pubescens, syn of Hancornia speciosa
11. Willughbeia scandens, syn of Pacouria guianensis
12. Willughbeia senensis, syn of Ancylobothrys petersiana
13. Willughbeia umbrosa, syn of Melodinus orientalis
