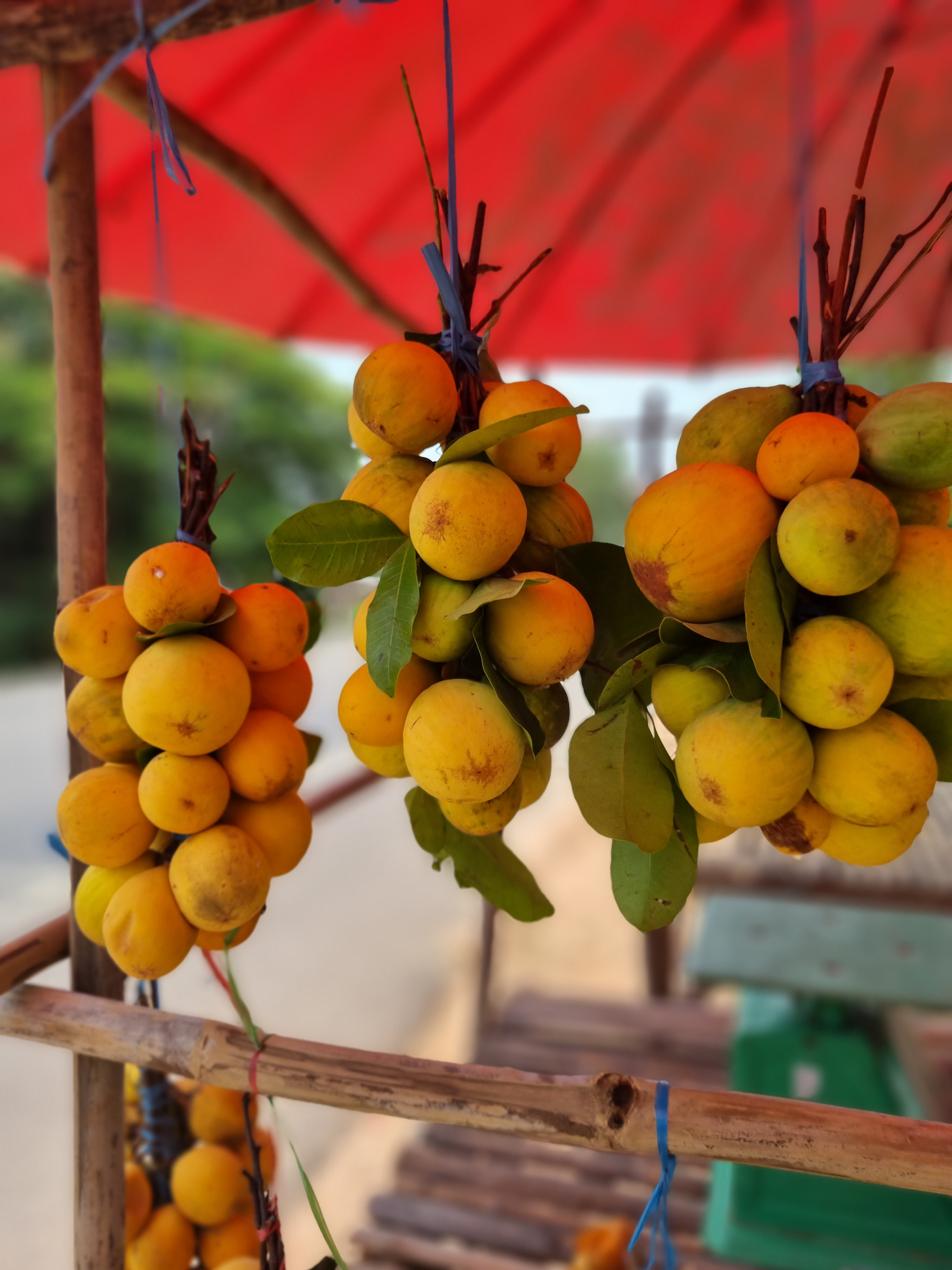
- Willughbeia edulis, known as Kouy fruit, for sale in Cambodia

Scientific classification
- Kingdom: Plantae
- Clade: Tracheophytes
- Clade: Angiosperms
- Clade: Eudicots
- Clade: Asterids
- Order: Gentianales
- Family: Apocynaceae
- Genus: Willughbeia
- Species: W. edulis

Binomial name
- Willughbeia edulis Roxb.

Synonyms
- Ambelania edulis (Roxb.) J.Presl; Ancylocladus edulis (Roxb.) Kuntze; Ancylocladus cochinchinensis Pierre; Ancylocladus curtisianus Pierre; Pacouria roxburghii Kostel.; Willughbeia cochinchinensis (Pierre) K.Schum.; Willughbeia curtisiana (Pierre) K.Schum.; Willughbeia dulcis Ridl.; Willughbeia gudara Steud.; Willughbeia kontumensis Lý; Willughbeia martabanica Wall.

= Willughbeia edulis =

Species of fruit and plant

Willughbeia edulis or rubber vine fruit is a vine species bearing tropical fruit in the family Apocynaceae.

== Taxonomy ==
Its species epithet edulis comes from Latin which means "edible". In fact, it is one of the rare climbing plants of Southeast Asia of which the fruits are eatable.

== Description ==
It is a yellow sour edible fruit found in: India, Indo-China (Cambodia, Myanmar, and Isan (northeastern) with Chanthaburi Province of Thailand as well as Vietnam) include Peninsular Malaysia. It may be known under a number of synonyms including "Willughbeia cochinchinensis".

After its reddish lenticelled stems are excised, they exude a milky latex which produces a rubber called chittagong. The roots can be used as a red dye and it may be used medicinally in parts of Asia including Cambodia.

== Vernacular names ==
Local names include: kuy (គុយ) in Cambodia; gedraphol, laleng-tenga, bel-tata in India; dton-kuy (ต้นคุย), kuiton (เถาคุย), kreua (เครือ), and katong-katiew (กะตังกะติ้ว) in Thai; bak yang-pa (บักยางป่า) in Isan dialect. talaing-no in Myanmar; and guồi in Vietnamese.

Kubal madu in Indonesia refers to a similar edible relative, W. sarawacensis.
