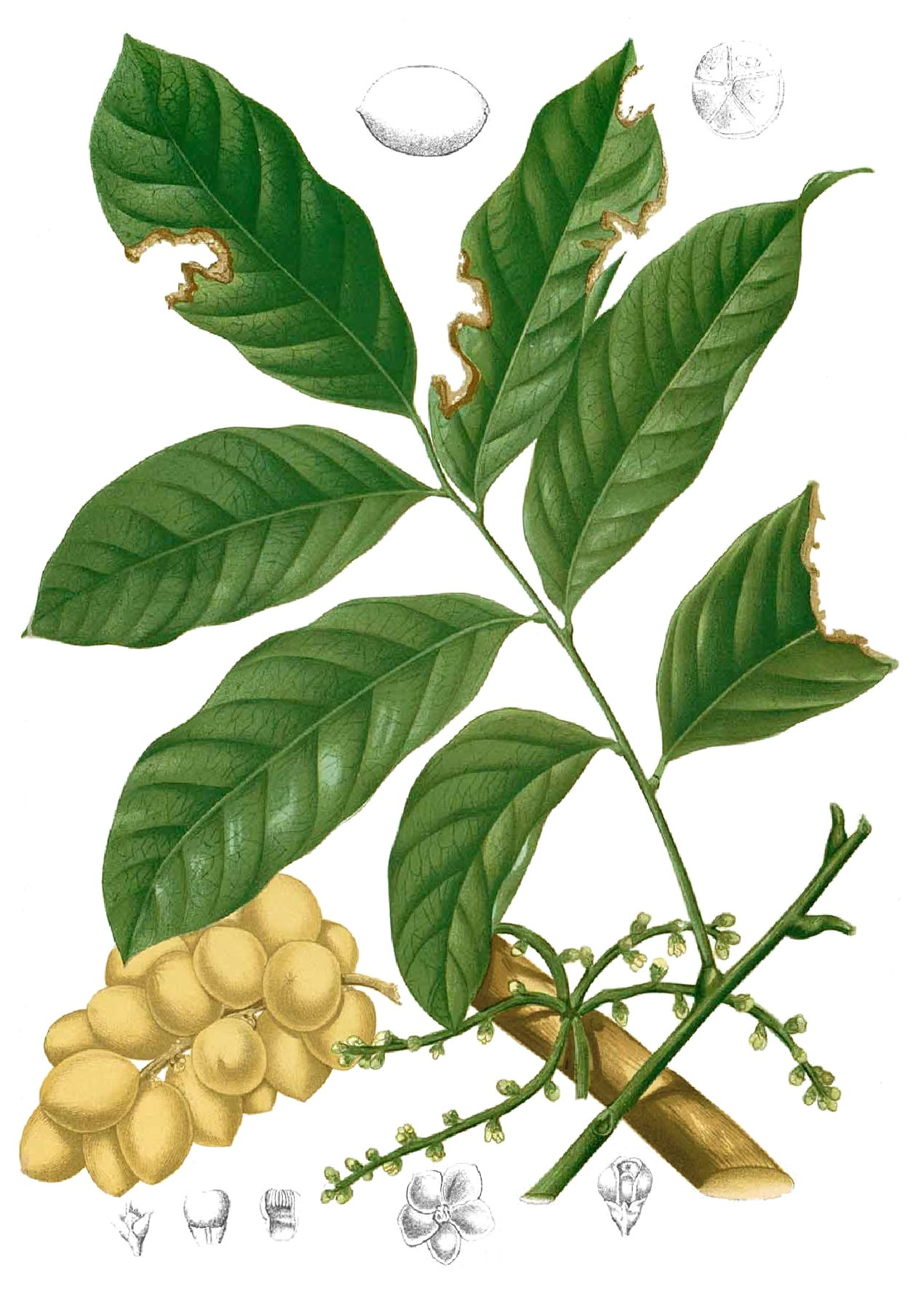
- Lansium domesticum

Scientific classification
- Kingdom: Plantae
- Clade: Tracheophytes
- Clade: Angiosperms
- Clade: Eudicots
- Clade: Rosids
- Order: Sapindales
- Family: Meliaceae
- Subfamily: Melioideae
- Genus: Lansium; Corrêa

Species
- See text

Synonyms
- Lachanodendron Reinw. ex Blume; Plutea Noronha

= Lansium =

Genus of flowering plants

Lansium is a genus of plants in the family Meliaceae, containing at least three species. The species Lansium domesticum is a tropical fruit-bearing tree that is cultivated in tropical Southeast Asia, and on a much smaller scale elsewhere in the tropics. Other previously named species are now placed in the genera Aglaia, Epicharis and Reinwardtiodendron.

== Taxonomy and related genera ==
The genus was named in 1807 by the Portuguese botanist José Francisco Corrêa da Serra. As of 2024, Plants of the World Online recognizes the following species of Lansium.

- Lansium breviracemosum Kosterm. - Lesser Sunda Islands
- Lansium domesticum Corrêa - type species - Malesia, introduced elsewhere in SE Asia
- Lansium membranaceum (Kosterm.) Mabb. - Sumatra

Note: "Lansium parasiticum", has been used in place of L. domesticum;
it is a synonym of Epicharis parasitica (also in the Meliaceae).

Phylogenetic studies suggest the following relationships amongst closely related genera:

- - Lansium Corrêa
  - Reinwardtiodendron Koord.
- - Heckeldora Pierre
  - Vavaea Benth.
