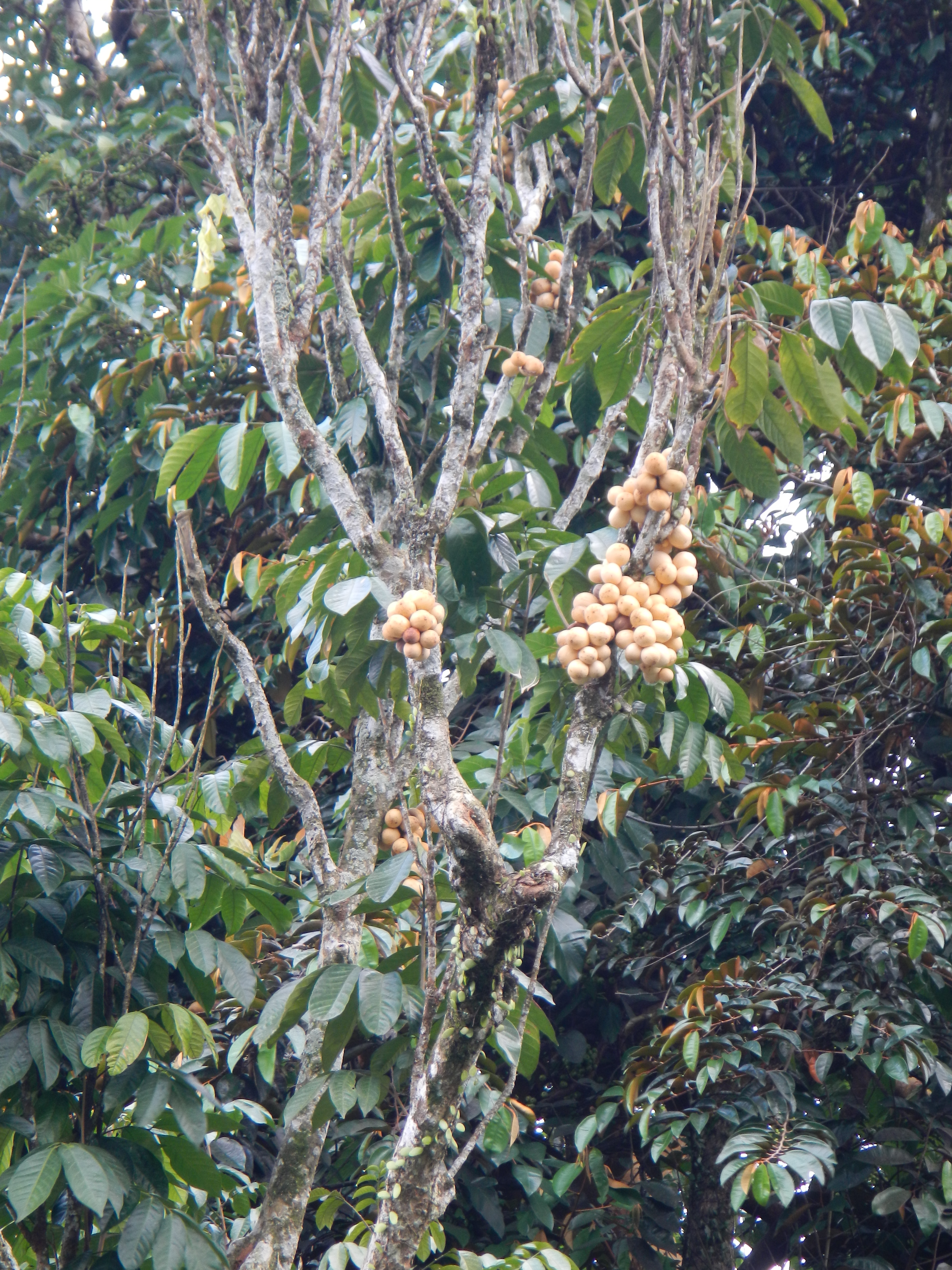
- Lansium domesticum tree with fruits in Laguna, Philippines
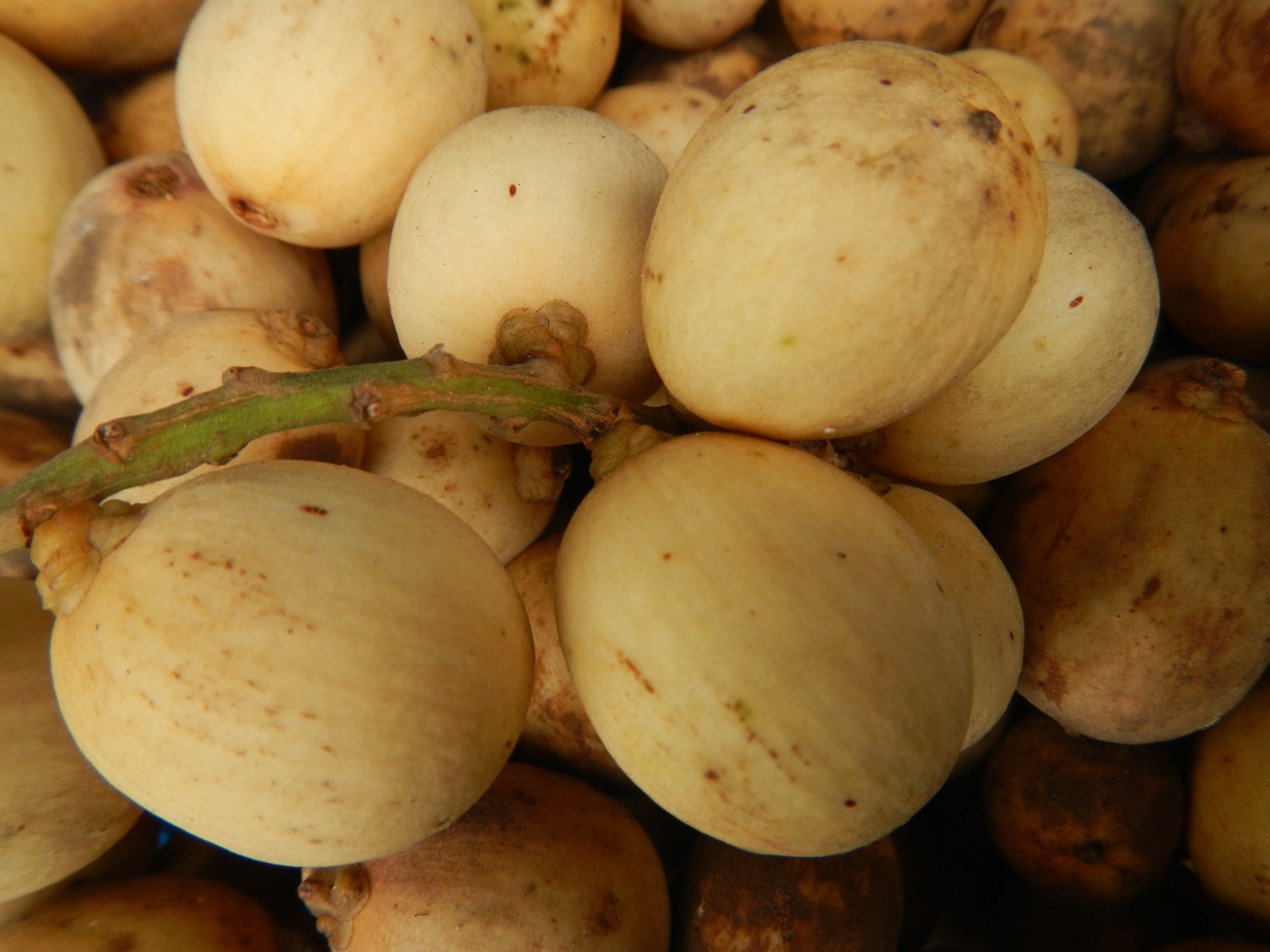
- Lansium domesticum fruits

Scientific classification
- Kingdom: Plantae
- Clade: Tracheophytes
- Clade: Angiosperms
- Clade: Eudicots
- Clade: Rosids
- Order: Sapindales
- Family: Meliaceae
- Genus: Lansium
- Species: L. domesticum

Binomial name
- Lansium domesticum Corrêa

Synonyms
- List: Aglaia aquea (Jacq.) Kosterm.; Aglaia domestica (Corrêa) Pellegr.; Aglaia dookoo Griff.; Aglaia intricatoreticulata Kosterm.; Aglaia merrillii Elmer nom. inval.; Aglaia sepalina (Kosterm.) Kosterm.; Aglaia steenisii Kosterm.; Amoora racemosa Ridl.; Lachanodendron domesticum (Corrêa) Nees; Lansium aqueum (Jack) Miq.; Lansium javanicum M.Roem.; Lansium sepalinum Kosterm.

= Lansium domesticum =

Species of tree

Lansium domesticum, commonly known as langsat (/ˈlɑːŋsɑːt/) or lanzones, /lɑːnˈzɔːnɛs/,-/ˈsɔː/-) is a species of tree in the family Meliaceae with commercially cultivated edible fruits. The species is native to Southeast Asia, from peninsular Thailand and Malaysia to Indonesia and the Philippines.

== Description ==
The tree is medium sized, reaching up to 30 metres (98 ft) in height and 75 centimetres (30 in) in diameter. 30 years old trees grown from seed and planted at 8 × 8 meter spacing can have a height of 10 meters and diameter of 25 cm. The trunk grows irregularly, with its buttress roots showing above ground. The tree's bark is a greyish colour, with light and dark spots. Its resin is thick and milk coloured.

The pinnately compound leaves occur in odd numbers, with thin hair, and 6 to 9 buds at intervals. The buds are long and elliptical, approximately 9 to 21 centimetres (3.5 to 8.3 in) by 5 to 10 centimetres (2.0 to 3.9 in) in size. The upper edge shines, and the leaves themselves have pointed bases and tips. The stems of the buds measure 5 to 12 millimetres (0.20 to 0.47 in).

The flowers are located in inflorescences that grow and hang from large branches or the trunk; the bunches may number up to 5 in one place. They are often branched at their base, measure 10 to 30 centimetres (3.9 to 11.8 in) in size, and have short fur. The flowers are small, with short stems, and are perfect. The sheathe is shaped like a five lobed cup and is coloured a greenish-yellow. The corona is egg-shaped and hard, measuring 2 to 3 millimetres (0.079 to 0.118 in) by 4 to 5 millimetres (0.16 to 0.20 in). There is one stamen, measuring 2 millimetres (0.079 in) in length. The top of the stamen is round. The pistil is short and thick.

The fruit can be elliptical, ovoid or round, measuring 2 to 7 centimetres (0.79 to 2.76 in) by 1.5 to 5 centimetres (0.59 to 1.97 in) in size. Fruits look much like small potatoes and are borne in clusters similar to grapes. The larger fruits are on the variety known as duku. It is covered by thin, yellow hair giving a slightly fuzzy aspect. The skin thickness varies with the varieties, from 2 millimetres (0.079 in) to approximately 6 millimetres (0.24 in). With the skin removed, the fruit resembles peeled garlic in appearance, with around five white, translucent lobes, some of which contain a flat, bitter tasting seed. The seeds are covered with a thick, clear-white aril that tastes sweet and sour. The taste has been likened to a combination of grape and grapefruit and is considered excellent by most. The sweet juicy flesh contains sucrose, fructose, and glucose. For consumption, cultivars with small or undeveloped seeds and thick aril are preferred.

== Cultivars ==
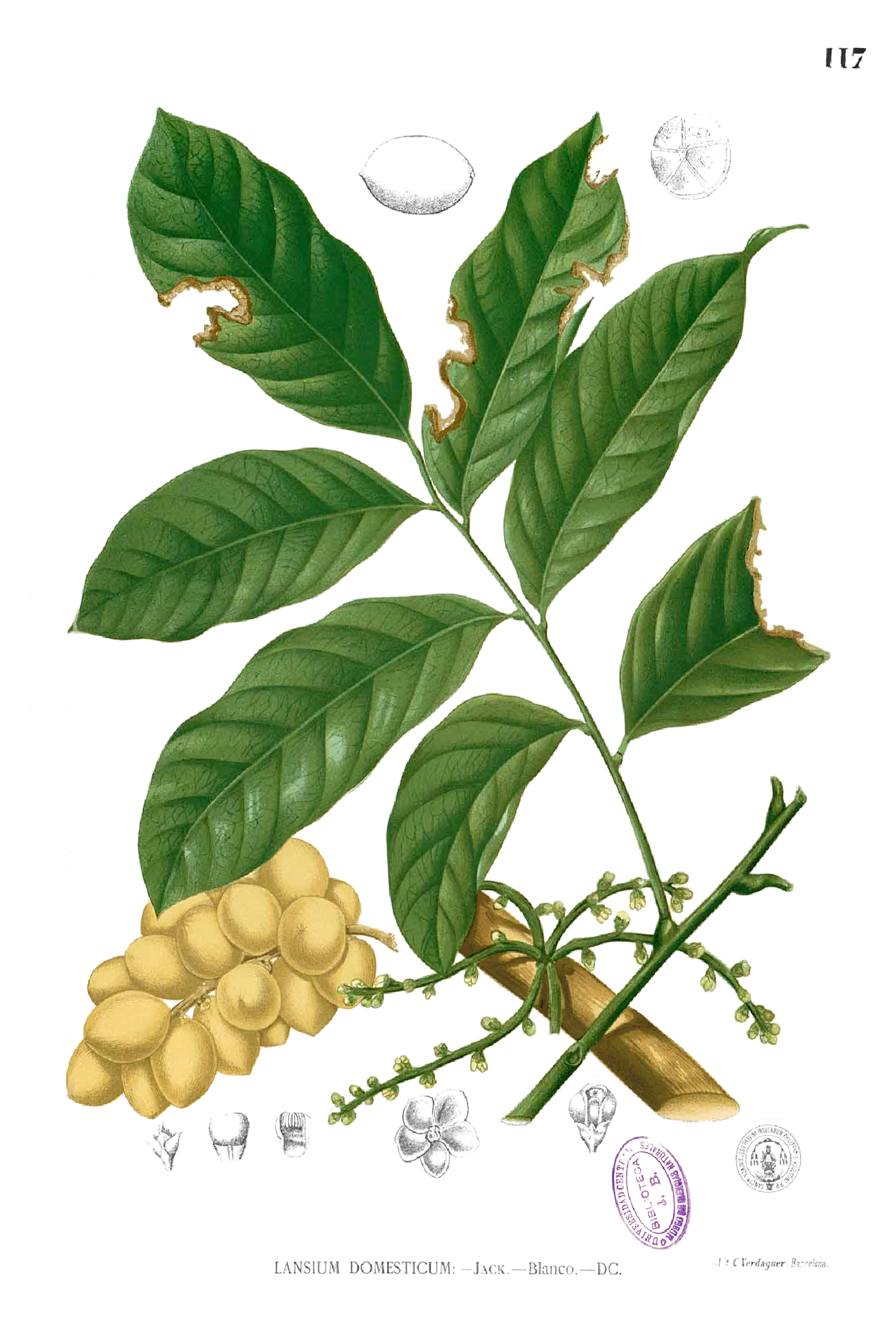
Botanical illustration of L. domesticum leaves, flowers, and fruits, from Flora de Filipinas (c. 1837) by the Spanish friar and botanist Manuel Blanco

There are numerous cultivars of L. domesticum. Overall, the two most commonly grown cultivars are 'Duku' and 'Langsat'.

- 'Duku' (also variously spelled as 'Duco', 'Doekoe', 'Dookoo', etc.) generally is more robust with an intermediate habit. It has a dense spreading crowns of bright green and broad leaves and conspicuously-veined leaflets. It bears short bunches of few fruit (usually 4 to 12). The individual fruit are around 3.5 cm (1.4 in) long and 4 to 5 cm (1.6 to 2.0 in) in diameter, generally round, and have a somewhat thick skin that has little to no latex when ripe. Each fruit has 1 to 2 seeds. The seeds are small, with thick flesh, a sweet scent, and a sweet or sour taste. Ripe fruits are around 18 °Bx after 3 days from harvest.
- 'Langsat' generally has more slender trees, with a less dense crown consisting of dark green leaves and stiff branches. The bunches are longer, and each bunch holds between 15 and 25 fruit. Fruits are more ovoid and range from around 3 cm (1.2 in) to 4 cm (1.6 in) in diameter. It has around 1 to 5 seeds per fruit. The skin is thin and releases a white sap when ripe. The flesh is watery and tastes sweet and sour.
- 'Longkong' (sometimes referred to as 'Duku Langsat') is a natural cross between 'Duku' and 'Langsat'. It bears round to oblong fruits of around 4 to 5 cm (1.6 to 2.0 in) long and 3.5 cm (1.4 in) in diameter, arranged in long clusters of 15 to 25. The tree has an upright growth habit with dark green leaves. It is the sweetest among all varieties, aromatic, having no latex when ripe, and almost seedless with 0 to 1 seeds per fruit. Ripe fruits are around 18 to 20 °Bx after 3 days from harvest.

In the Philippines, the most commonly cultivated cultivars are the 'Paete' and 'Jolo' cultivars. In addition, 'Duku', 'Longkong', and other native cultivars, are also commercially cultivated in the Philippines.

- 'Paete' (named after Paete, Laguna) is similar to the 'Langsat' cultivar. It is particularly well-known as a regional specialty of Camiguin, Gingoog, and Laguna. It bears long bunches of 15 to 25 fruits that are around 3.2 cm (1.3 in) long and 2.7 cm (1.1 in) in diameter. It is almost seedless, with each fruit having 0 to 2 seeds. It has an upright habit, with narrower leaves. The sweet thin-skinned fruits exude latex even when ripe. Ripe fruits are around 16 °Bx after 3 days from harvest.
- 'Jolo' (also known as 'Mindanao') is common in Mindanao, particularly in Davao, Jolo, and the Zamboanga Peninsula. It bears fruits that are around 3.5 cm (1.4 in) long and 3.2 cm (1.3 in) in diameter. Each fruit has 1-3 large seeds. It has spreading dense canopies with broad leaves. It commonly grows in the wild where it is pollinated by fruit bats. It is a bit sour in comparison to other commercial cultivars, but it is usually used as rootstock due to its bigger and more viable seeds. It has a longer shelf-life due to its slightly thicker skin in comparison to 'Paete'. Ripe fruits are around 13 °Bx after 3 days from harvest.

Other notable varieties include 'Concepcion' (often misspelled as 'Conception', named after Concepcion, Talisay, Negros Occidental) from the Philippines; and 'Uttaradit', a cultivar that is a regional specialty of Uttaradit province, Thailand.

Another variety grown in Indonesia is 'Kokosan' (also known by various other native names, including pisitan, pijetan, and bijitan). It is distinguished by its hairy leaves, as well as the tightly packed dark yellow fruit on its bunches. The fruit tends to be small, with thin skin and little sap; the skin is difficult to remove. To be eaten, the fruit is bitten and the flesh sucked through the hole created, or rubbed until the skin breaks and the seeds are retrieved. The seeds are relatively large, with thin, sour flesh.

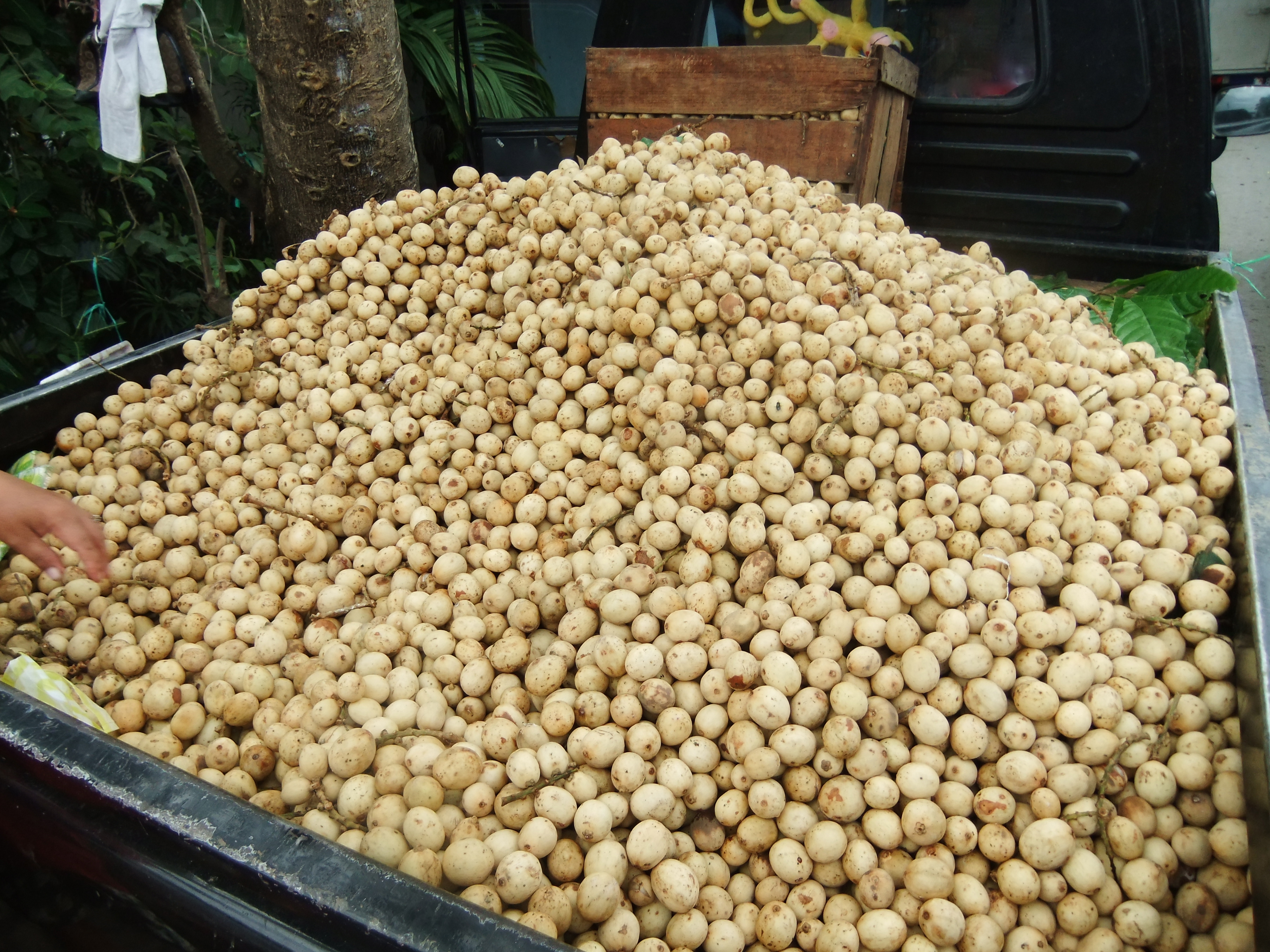
L. domesticum 'Langsat' being sold in Makassar, Indonesia

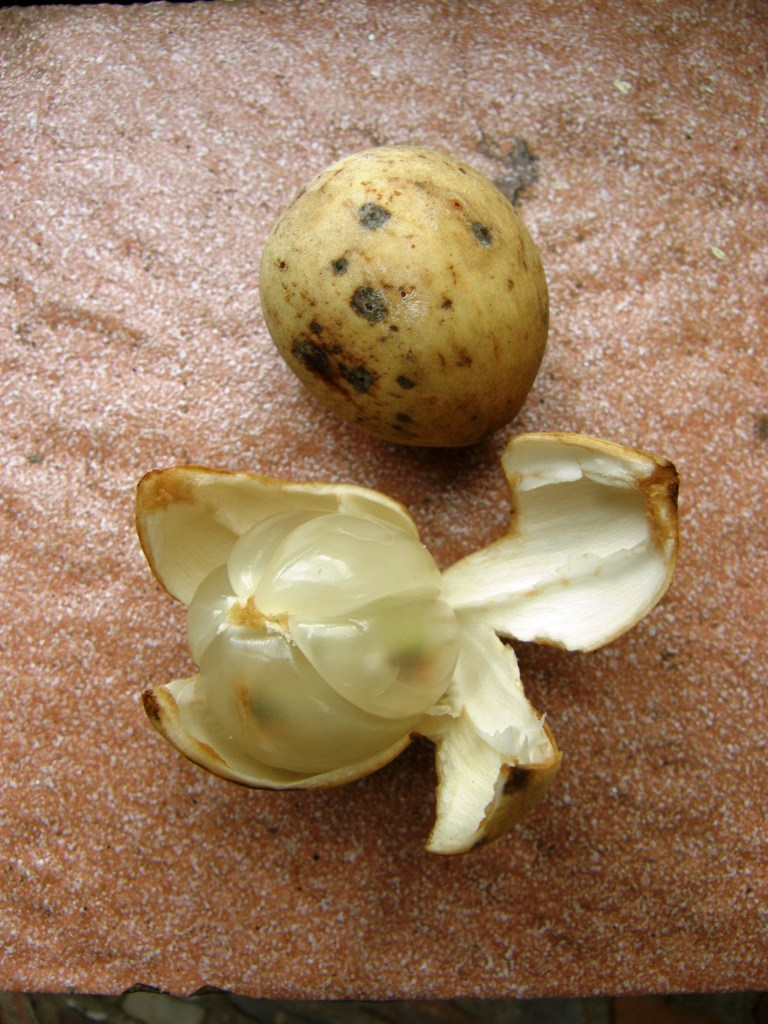
L. domesticum 'Langsat' peeled open, note the thin skin and the five lobes

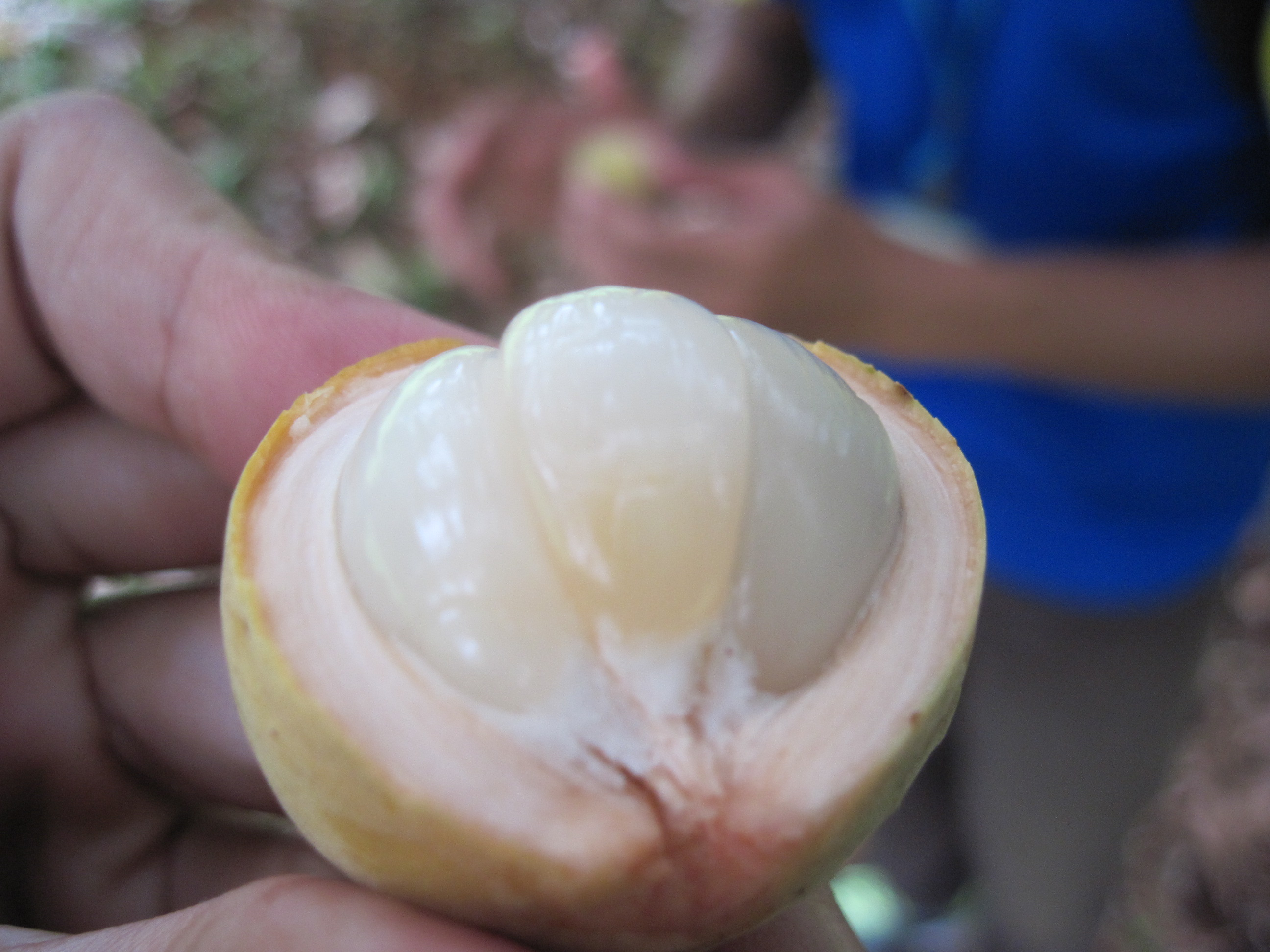
L. domesticum 'Duku' in Malaysia peeled open, note the thick skin

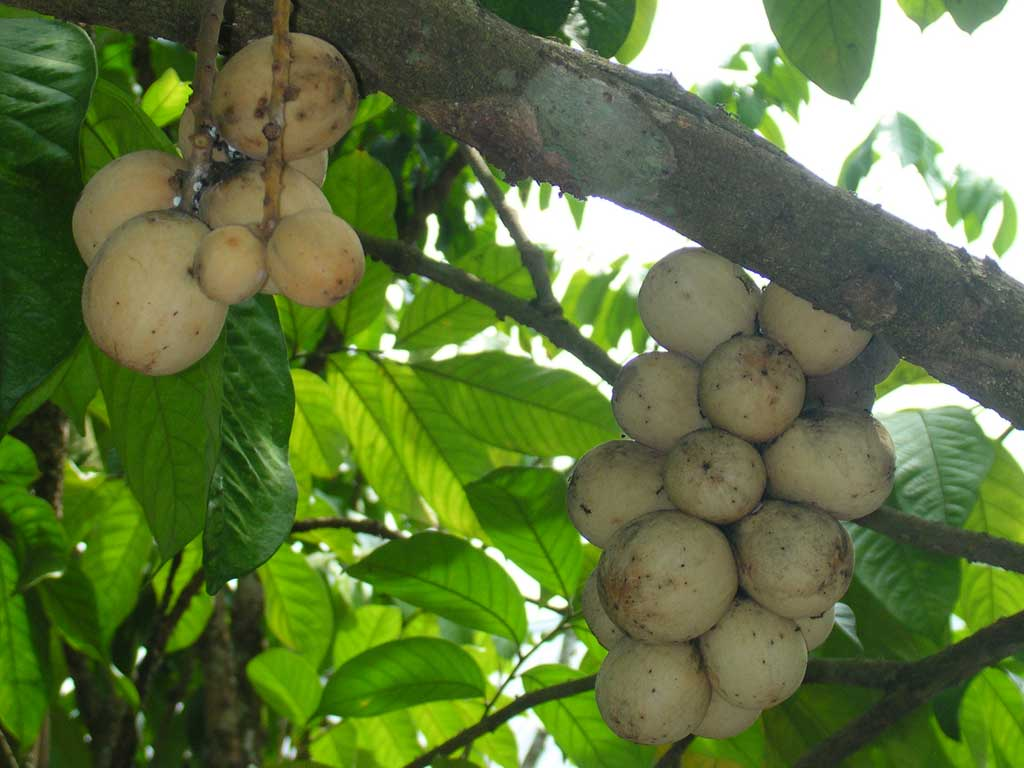
L. domesticum 'Jolo' cultivar growing in Valencia, Negros Oriental, Philippines

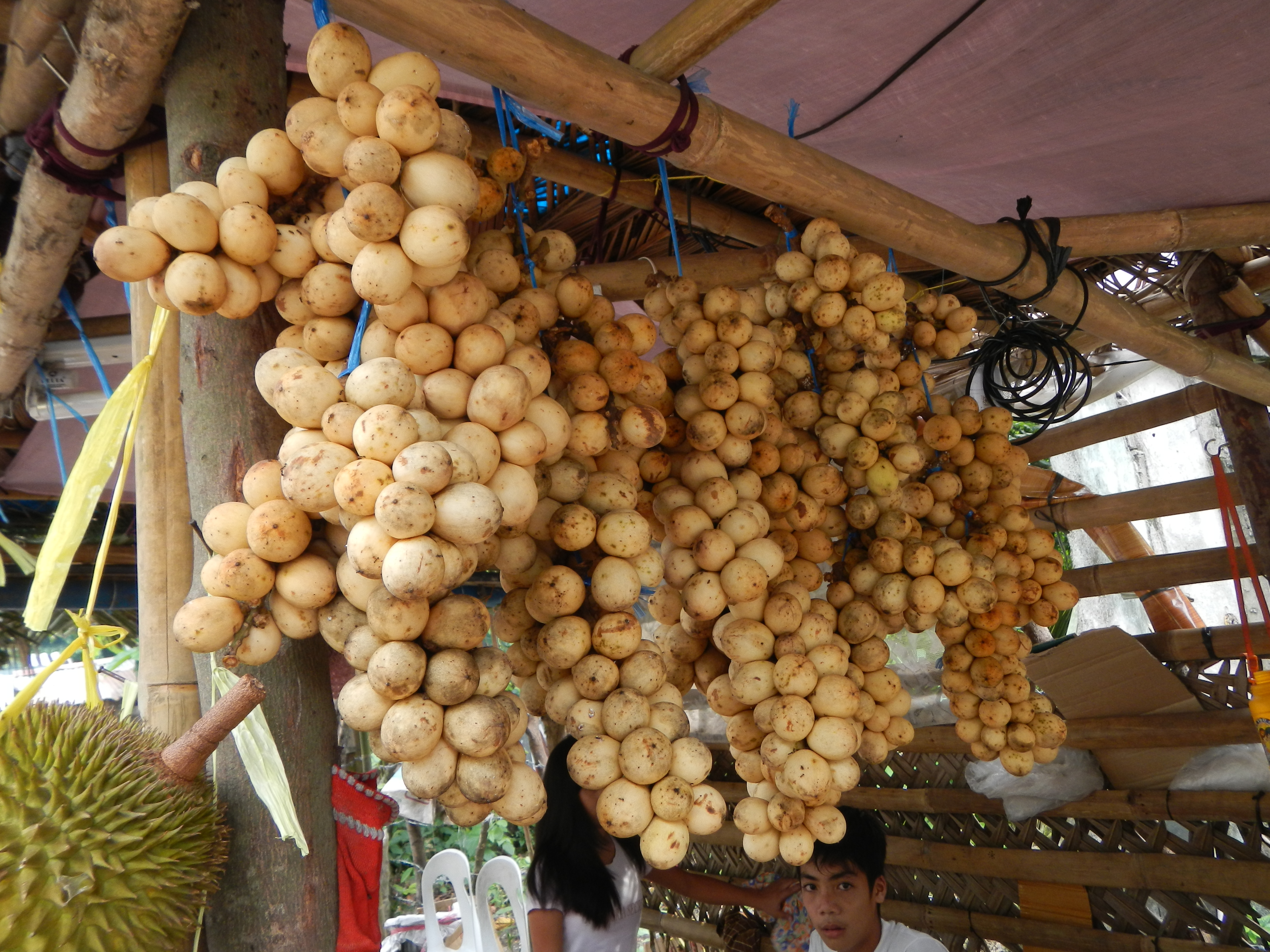
L. domesticum 'Paete' being sold in Paete, Laguna, Philippines

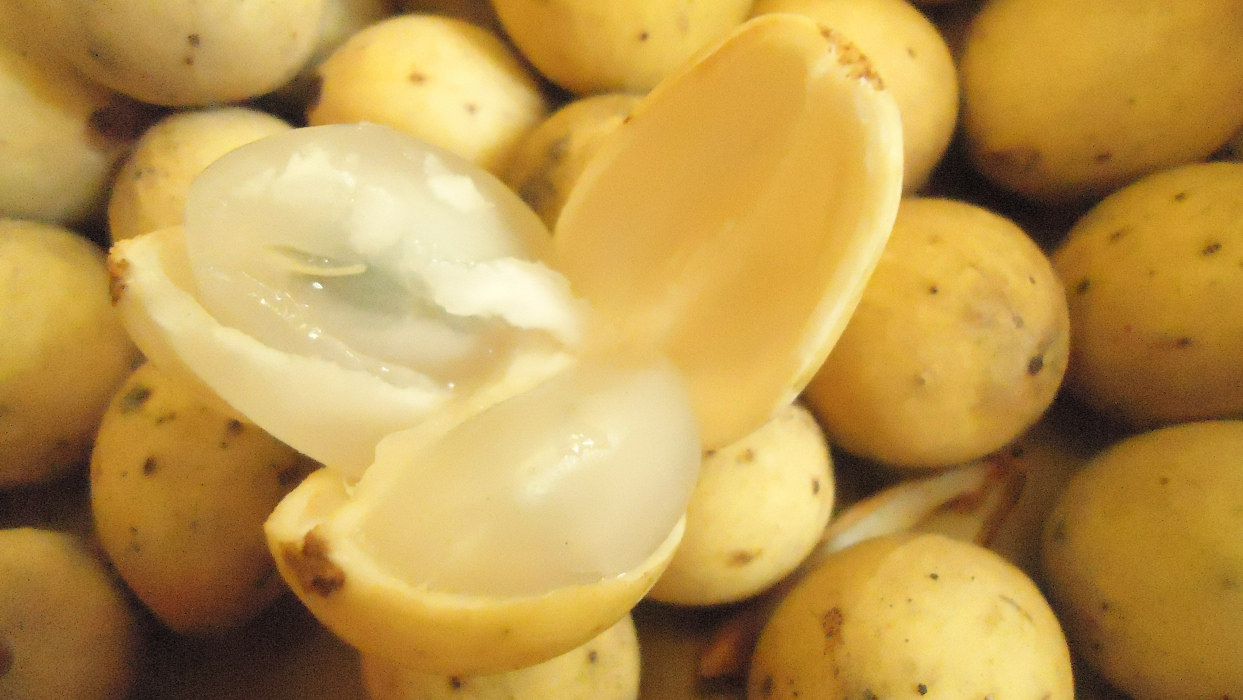
L. domesticum 'Paete' peeled open

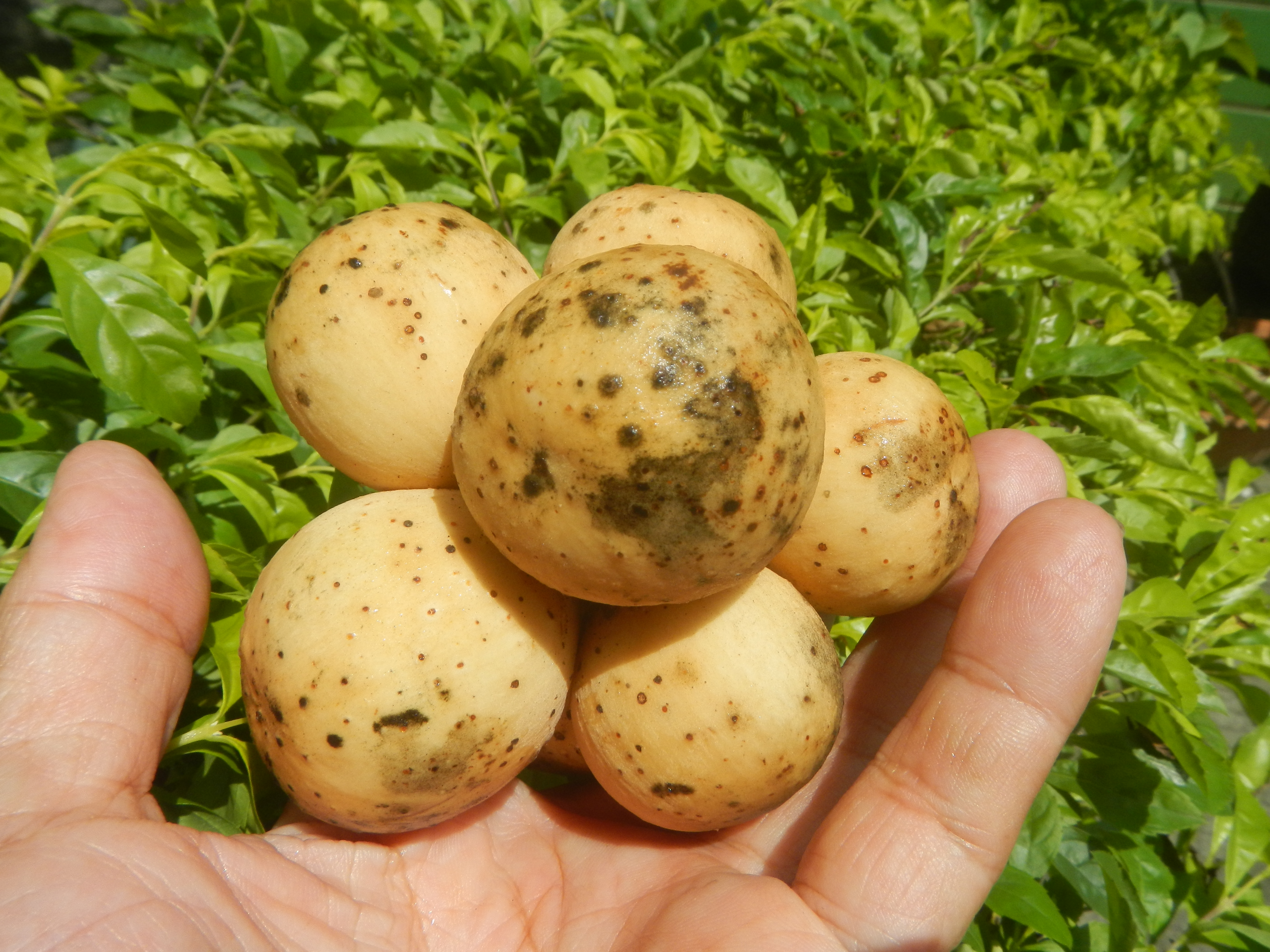
L. domesticum 'Longkong' in Bulacan, Philippines

== Reproduction ==
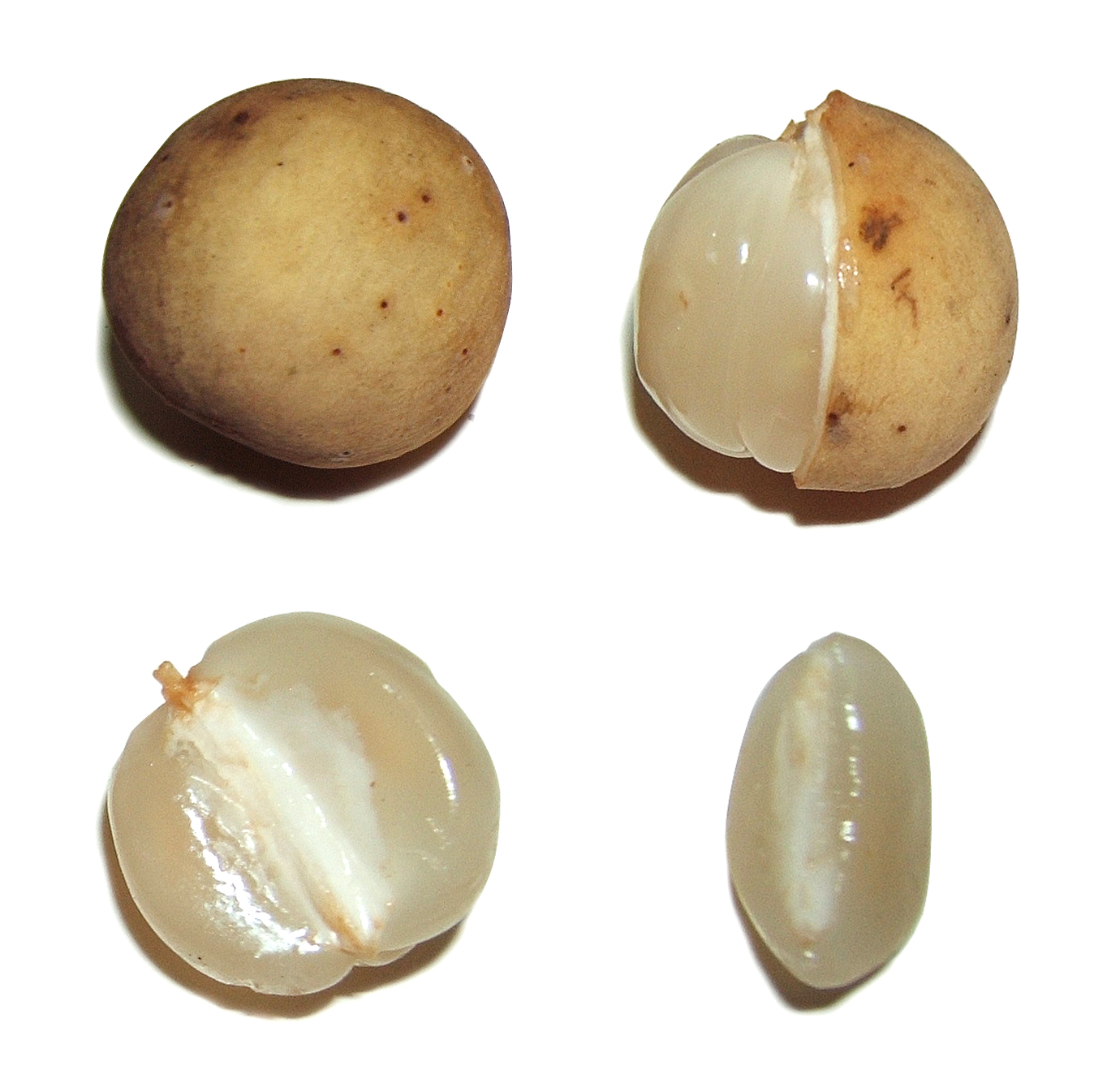
Peeled L. domesticum, showing the clear-white aril around the seed

The seeds of L. domesticum are polyembryonic, the multiple embryos resulting from apomixis.

Lansium domesticum is traditionally reproduced by spreading seedlings, either cultivated or collected from below the tree. It has been said that new seedlings require 20 to 25 years to bear fruit, with the possibility of the quality being inferior. However, other sources quote 12 years to first production from seed and no variations. Production often varies from year to year, and depends to some extent on having a dry period to induce flowering. One example of ten trees in Costa Rica about twenty-five years old produced during five years the following weights of salable fruits: 2008: 50 kilos, 2009: 2000 kilos, 2010: 1000 kilos, 2011: 100 kilos, 2012: 1500 kilos. Experiments in the Philippines with grafting where two trees are planted close to each other and then grafted when one to two meters tall to leave twin root systems on a single main trunk have resulted in earlier and less erratic fruit production.

Another common method is by air layering. Although the process requires up to several months, the new rooted tree produced is itself ready to bear fruit within two years. Trees cultivated with this method have a high death rate, and the growths are less resilient.

The third common way to reproduce L. domesticum is with grafting. This results in the new trees having the same genetic characteristics as their parent, and being ready to bear fruit within five to six years. The offspring are relatively stronger than transplanted shoots.

== Ecology ==
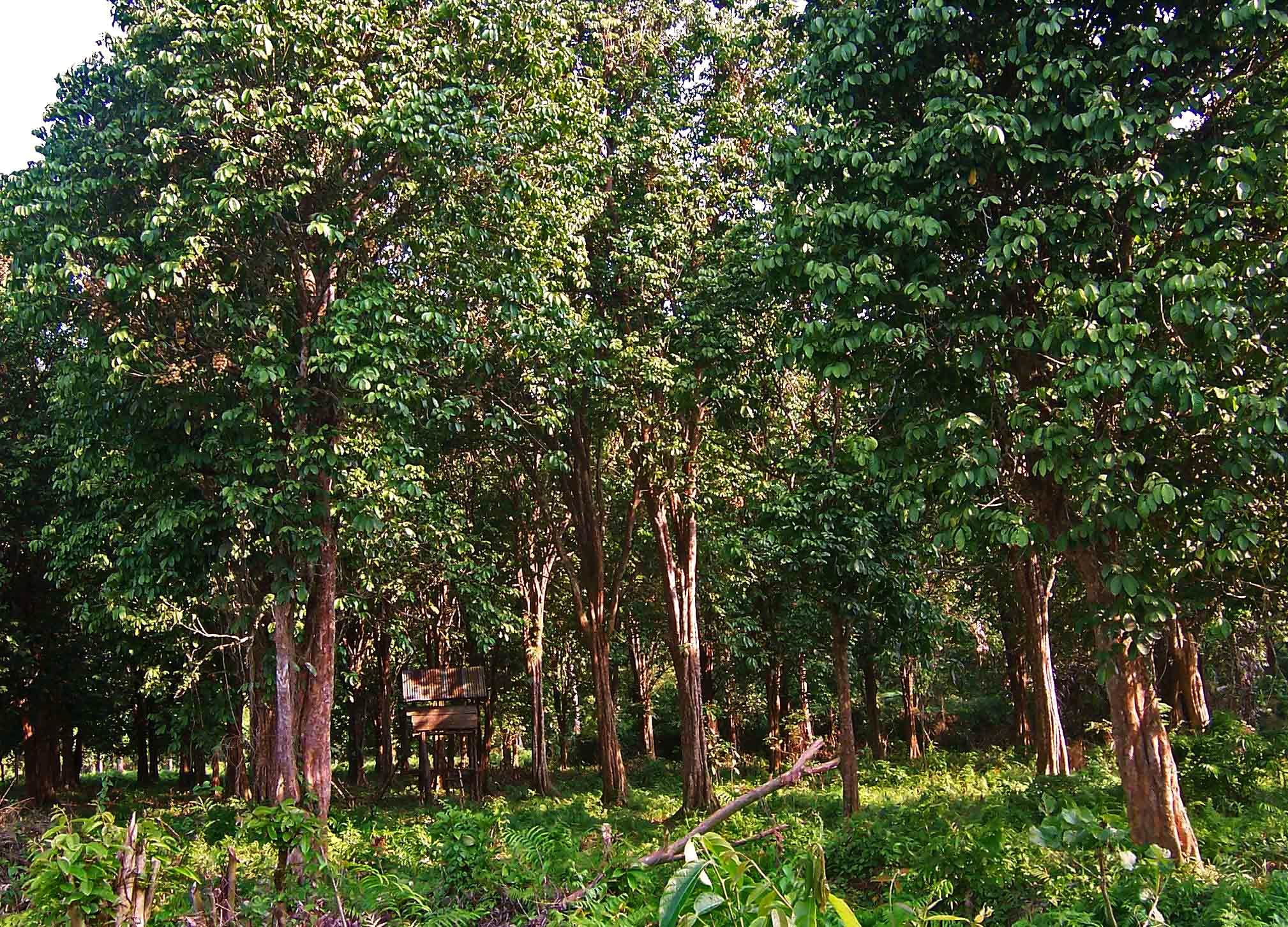
A Lansium domesticum agroforest in Musi Rawas, Sumatra, Indonesia

Lansium domesticum grows well in mixed agroforests. The plant, especially the duku variant, prefers damp, shaded areas. It can be grown in the same agroforest as durian, petai, and jengkol, as well as wood-producing trees.

Lansium domesticum is grown from low grounds up to heights of 600 metres (2,000 ft) above sea level, in areas with an average rainfall of 1,500 to 2,500 millimetres (59 to 98 in) a year. The plant can grow and blossom in latosol, yellow podzol, and alluvium. The plant prefers slightly acidic soil with good drainage and rich in mulch. The langsat variant is hardier, and can weather dry seasons with a little shade and water. The plant cannot handle floods.

Lansium domesticum generally bears fruit once a year. This period can vary between areas, but blooming is generally after the beginning of the rainy season and fruit production some four months later.

== Distribution ==
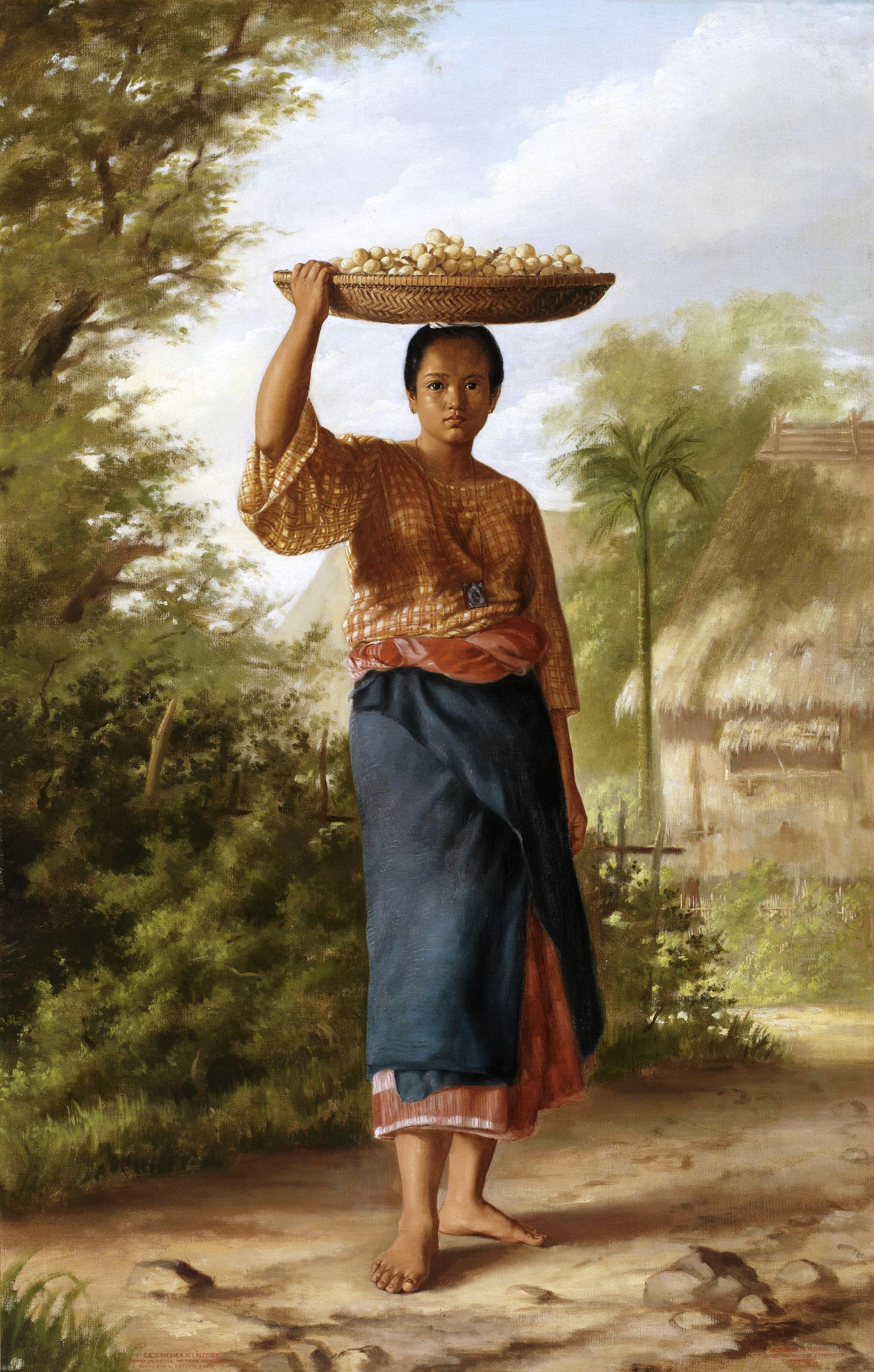
La Vendedora de Lanzones ("The Lanzones Seller") by the Filipino painter Félix Resurrección Hidalgo (1875) in the Museo del Prado

Lansium domesticum is native to the Malesian phytochorion of Southeast Asia, from Peninsular Thailand and Peninsular Malaysia, to Java, Sumatra, Borneo, the Philippines (Luzon, Camiguin, Basilan, and Mindanao), Sulawesi, and the Lesser Sunda Islands.

It has also been introduced to Laos, Cambodia, Vietnam, Myanmar, the Maluku Islands, New Guinea, Micronesia, Hawaii, Sri Lanka, India, the Seychelles, Trinidad and Tobago, and Suriname, among others.

The tree is cultivated commercially in the Philippines (Filipino lansones, Cebuano buwabuwa or buahan, among other names), Thailand (Thai: ลางสาด, langsat), Cambodia, Vietnam, India, Indonesia, and Malaysia. It grows well in the wetter areas (120 inches/3 meters or more annual rainfall) of Costa Rica, where it is still very rare, having been introduced decades ago by the United Fruit Company. A major hindrance to its acceptance seems to be that it is very slow in bearing, said to take 12 years or more from seed. However, air layering from mature trees, as well as grafting, are said to work well and produce much faster.

== Uses ==
The largest producers of Lansium domesticum are the Philippines, Indonesia, Thailand, and Malaysia. The production is mostly for internal consumption, although some are exported to Singapore, Hong Kong and Kuwait.

Lansium domesticum is cultivated mainly for its fruit, which can be eaten raw. The fruit can also be bottled in syrup. The wood is hard, thick, heavy, and resilient, allowing it to be used in the construction of rural houses.

== In culture ==
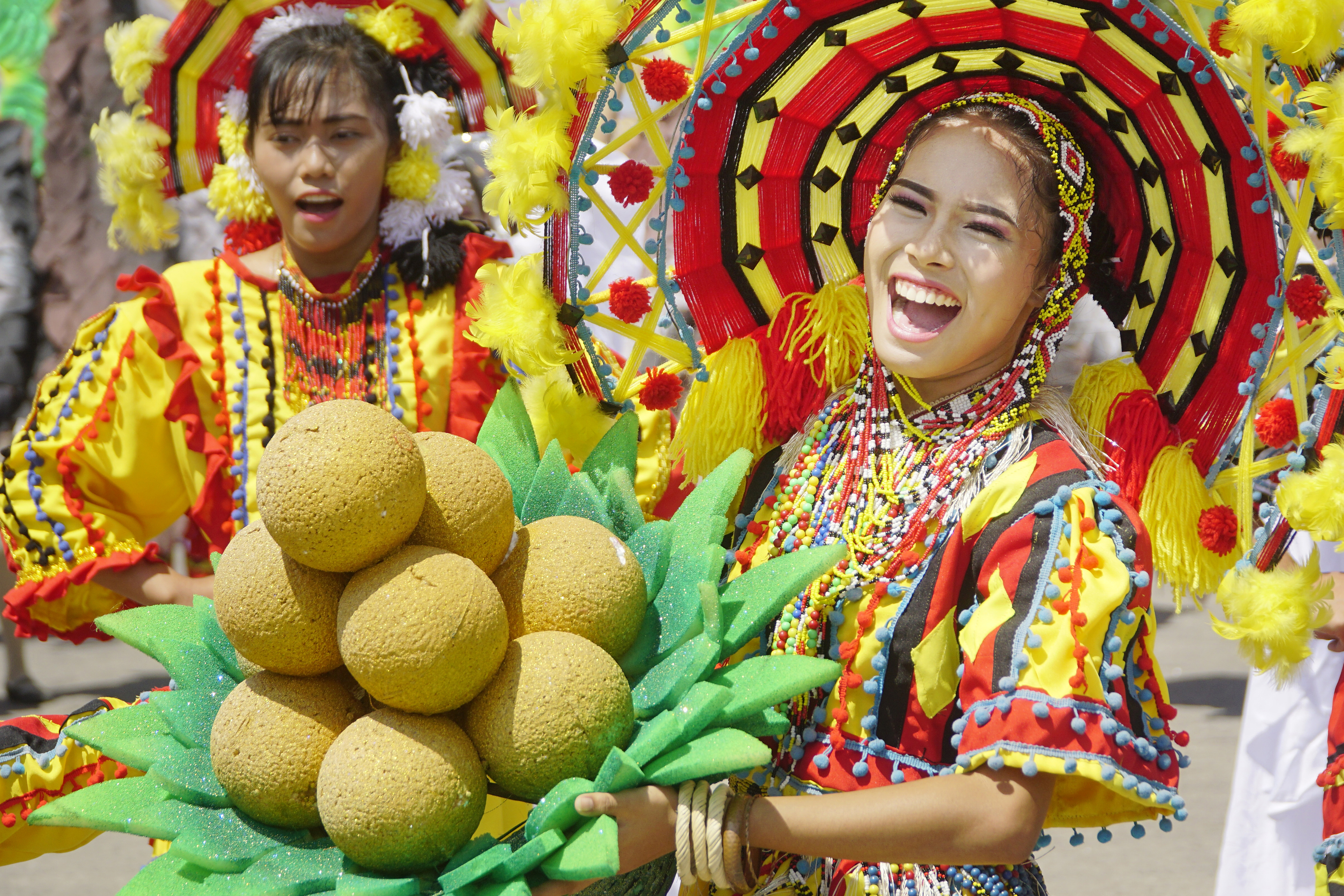
Street dancers in traditional Kamigin Manobo attire in the Lanzones Festival of Camiguin Island, Philippines

In the Philippines, the island of Camiguin holds an annual Lanzones Festival in October in celebration of the fruit and the indigenous culture of the island's Kamigin Manobo people. The town of Paete, Laguna in the northern Philippines, also holds the annual Paet-Taka-Lanzones Festival every third week of September. The barangay of Concepcion in the city of Talisay, Negros Occidental, where the cultivar 'Concepcion' originates from, also celebrates the fruit in the Maradula Festival (an acronym for Marang, Mangosteen, Rambutan, Durian and Lanzones). Maradula Festival was originally also known as the "Lanzones Festival" in the 1980s, but the name was changed in 2009 to include other local fruit products and to avoid confusion with the Camiguin festival.

In Thailand, an annual Langsat Festival is held in Uttaradit province every September.

== See also ==
- Lychee
- Longan
- Baccaurea macrocarpa (tampoi)
- Epicharis parasitica: species corresponding with the synonym "Lansium parasiticum"
- Sandoricum koetjape (santol)
- Willughbeia angustifolia
