= Willughbeia cirrhifera =

Conservation status
- Vulnerable (IUCN 2.3)

Scientific classification
- Kingdom: Plantae
- Clade: Tracheophytes
- Clade: Angiosperms
- Clade: Eudicots
- Clade: Asterids
- Order: Gentianales
- Family: Apocynaceae
- Genus: Willughbeia
- Species: W. cirrhifera

Binomial name
- Willughbeia cirrhifera Abeyw.

Species of plant

Willughbeia cirrhifera is a species of plant in the family Apocynaceae. It is endemic to Sri Lanka.
