= Reinwardtiodendron cinereum =

Conservation status
- Least Concern (IUCN 3.1)

Scientific classification
- Kingdom: Plantae
- Clade: Embryophytes
- Clade: Tracheophytes
- Clade: Angiosperms
- Clade: Eudicots
- Clade: Rosids
- Order: Sapindales
- Family: Meliaceae
- Genus: Reinwardtiodendron
- Species: R. cinereum

Binomial name
- Reinwardtiodendron cinereum (Hiern) Mabb.

Synonyms
- Lansium cinereum Hiern; Aglaia pseudolansium Kosterm.

Species of tree

Reinwardtiodendron cinereum is a tree in the family Meliaceae. It is native to Southeast Asia. The specific epithet cinereum means 'ashen', referring to the leaves' colour on drying.

== Description ==
Reinwardtiodendron cinereum grows up to 27 metres (90 ft) tall, with a trunk diameter of up to 70 cm (28 in). It has a bole up to 18 m (60 ft) tall and buttresses to 1 m (3.3 ft) tall. The leaves are elliptic and measure up to 5.5 cm (2 in) long, occasionally to 8 cm (3 in). The fruits are yellow.

== Distribution and habitat ==
Reinwardtiodendron cinereum is native to Peninsular Malaysia, Sumatra and Borneo. Its habitat is forests at elevations to 700 m (2,000 ft).
