= Reinwardtiodendron kinabaluense =

Scientific classification
- Kingdom: Plantae
- Clade: Embryophytes
- Clade: Tracheophytes
- Clade: Angiosperms
- Clade: Eudicots
- Clade: Rosids
- Order: Sapindales
- Family: Meliaceae
- Genus: Reinwardtiodendron
- Species: R. kinabaluense

Binomial name
- Reinwardtiodendron kinabaluense (Kosterm.) Mabb.

Synonyms
- Aglaia kinabaluensis Kosterm.

Species of tree

Reinwardtiodendron kinabaluense is a tree in the family Meliaceae, native to Borneo. It is named for Mount Kinabalu.

== Description ==
Reinwardtiodendron kinabaluense grows up to 20 metres (70 ft) tall, occasionally to 35 m (110 ft), with a trunk diameter of up to 25 cm (10 in). It has a bole up to 15 m (50 ft) tall, featuring buttresses. Its bark is smooth. The leaves are elliptic to oblong and measure up to 15 cm (6 in) long. The fruits are yellow.

== Distribution and habitat ==
Reinwardtiodendron kinabaluense is endemic to Borneo. Its habitat is forests to elevations of 900 m (3,000 ft).
