= Reinwardtiodendron humile =

Scientific classification
- Kingdom: Plantae
- Clade: Tracheophytes
- Clade: Angiosperms
- Clade: Eudicots
- Clade: Rosids
- Order: Sapindales
- Family: Meliaceae
- Genus: Reinwardtiodendron
- Species: R. humile

Binomial name
- Reinwardtiodendron humile (Hassk.) D.J. Mabberley

Synonyms
- Reinwardtiodendron dubium (Merr.) X.M. Chen; Lansium humile Hassk. Lansium dubium Merrill; Aphanamixis humilis (Hassk.) Kosterm. Aglaia dubia (Merrill) Kosterm.

Species of tree

Reinwardtiodendron humile is a small tree species in the family Meliaceae. There are no subspecies listed in the Catalogue of Life.

== Description ==
They are shrubs to trees, typically 3-6 (to 27) m in height. Branches are greyish-white to brownish grey. Leaves: 120–200 mm; with petiole and rachis adaxially flat, abaxially rounded; leaflets generally in number of 3 or 5, sub-opposite or opposites; petioles 3–5 mm; thin elliptic to oblong-lanceolate, 60-100 × 25–40 mm, coriaceous, both surfaces glabrous and glossy. The female flowers are sessile, globose, 2–3 mm in diameter, axillary in the apical part of the branches, in spikes; rachis thin, finely grooved, with scattered flowers. The fruit is a berry of 17-20 × 12–13 mm, pubescent brown outside, with 1 or 2 seeds: from February–March.

== Distribution ==
It is found in thickets of the mountainous regions of: Hainan, Cambodia, Indonesia, Laos, Malaysia, the Philippines, Thailand and Vietnam.
