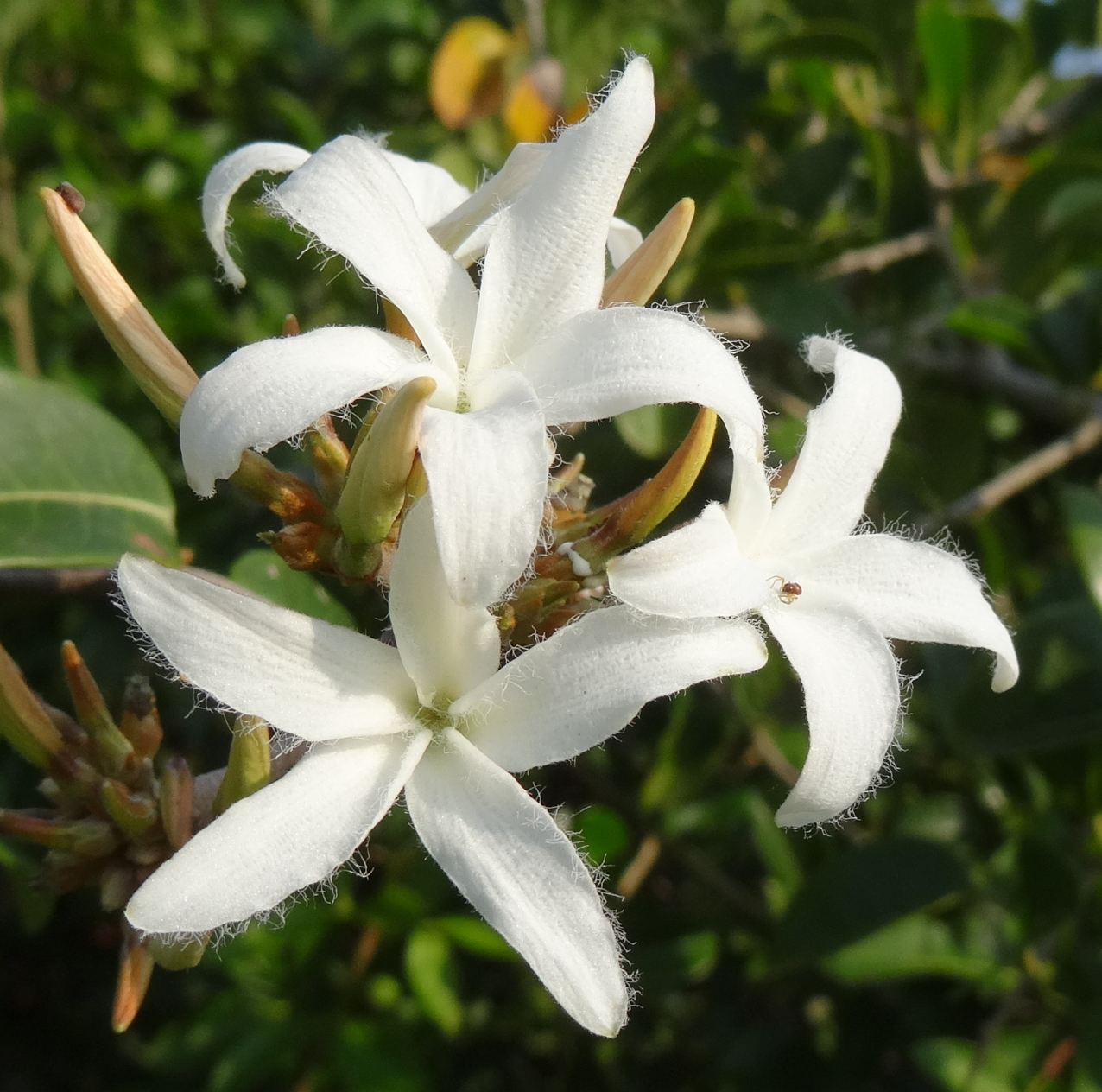
- Ancylobothrys petersiana

Scientific classification
- Kingdom: Plantae
- Clade: Tracheophytes
- Clade: Angiosperms
- Clade: Eudicots
- Clade: Asterids
- Order: Gentianales
- Family: Apocynaceae
- Subfamily: Rauvolfioideae
- Tribe: Willughbeieae
- Subtribe: Landolphiinae
- Genus: Ancylobothrys; Pierre

= Ancylobothrys =

Genus of flowering plants

Ancylobothrys (sometimes spelled Ancylobotrys) is a genus of plant in the family Apocynaceae found in tropical and southern Africa.

As of December 2023, Plants of the World Online accepted the following species:

- Ancylobothrys amoena Hua – W + C + E Africa
- Ancylobothrys capensis (Oliv.) Pichon – Botswana, South Africa
- Ancylobothrys petersiana (Klotzsch) Pierre – E + C + S Africa, Comoros, Madagascar; naturalized in Mauritius
- Ancylobothrys pumila K.Balkwill & R.A.Reddy – KwaZulu-Natal
- Ancylobothrys pyriformis Pierre – C Africa
- Ancylobothrys robusta Pierre – C Africa
- Ancylobothrys scandens (Schumach. & Thonn.) Pichon – W + C Africa
- Ancylobothrys tayloris (Stapf) Pichon – Kenya, Tanzania, Malawi, Mozambique
