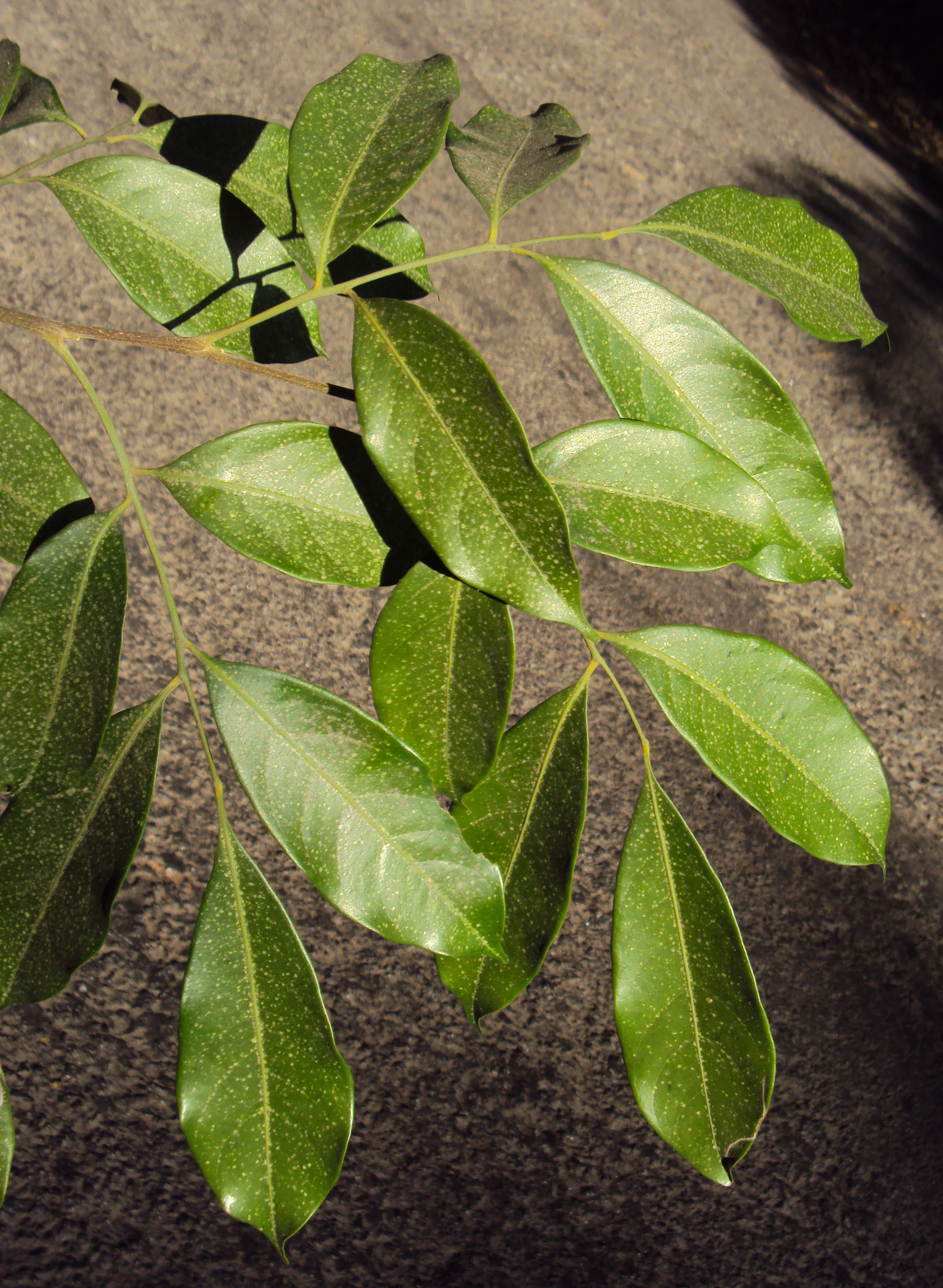

Scientific classification
- Kingdom: Plantae
- Clade: Tracheophytes
- Clade: Angiosperms
- Clade: Eudicots
- Clade: Rosids
- Order: Sapindales
- Family: Meliaceae
- Genus: Reinwardtiodendron
- Species: R. anamalaiense

Binomial name
- Reinwardtiodendron anamalaiense (Bedd.) Mabb.

Synonyms
- List: Aglaia anamallayana (Bedd.) Kosterm.; Lansium anamalaiense Bedd.

= Reinwardtiodendron anamalaiense =

Species of flowering plants

Reinwardtiodendron anamalaiense, is a species of flowering plant within the genus Reinwardtiodendron and family Meliaceae. It is an evergreen tree species native to India, where it is endemic to the Western Ghats. It is one of six known species within the genus Reinwardtiodendron.

== Description ==
Reinwardtiodendron anamalaiense is a species of evergreen tree, which is capable of reaching heights of up to 20 m (66 ft) tall. The bark of the tree is lenticellate and greyish brown in colour. Younger branches are terete, grey in colour and tomentose.

=== Leaves ===
The leaf is imparipinnate, characterized by a slender rachis measuring 4.2 to 11.5 cm (1.7 to 4.5 in) in length. It exhibits a swelling at its base, and is devoid of hairs. The leaf comprises 5–9 alternate leaflets, with each leaflet lacking stipules. Leaflets are attached to a slender petiolule measuring 5 to 8 mm (0.20 to 0.31 in) in length, that is also hairless. The lamina of the leaf is elliptic, lanceolate, or elliptic-obovate in shape, ranging from 5 to 15 cm (2 to 6 in) in length and 1.5 to 5.5 cm (0.6 to 2.2 in) in width. Its base is oblique, attenuate, or cuneate, while the apex varies between acuminate, obtusely acuminate, or caudate-acuminate. All leaves possess a smooth margin and a tough, leathery texture. The leaf features 8–10 pairs of pinnate, prominent lateral nerves, accompanied by visible intercostal reticulations. The leaf also possesses domatia within its structure.

=== Flowers and fruit ===
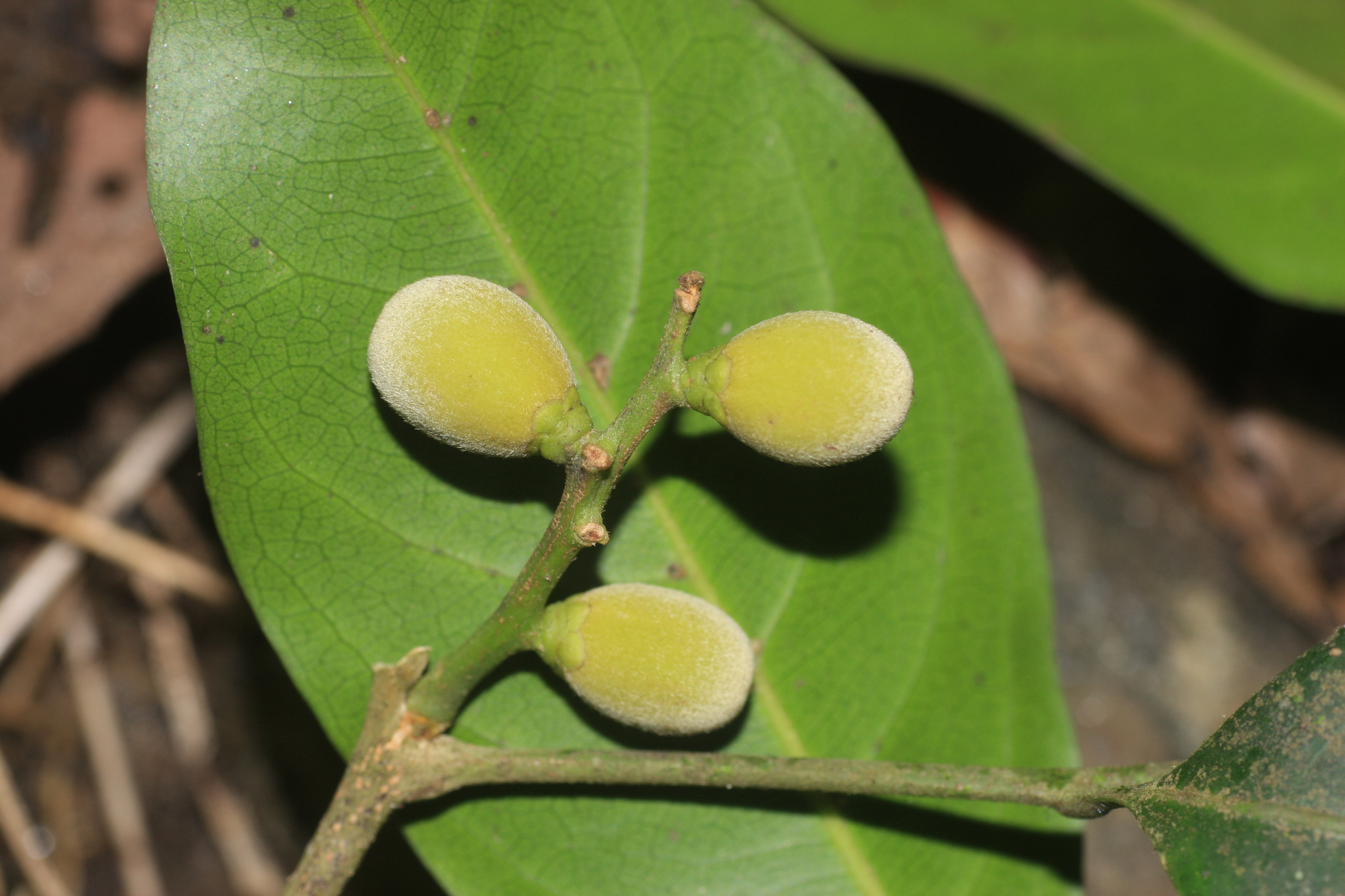
The fruit of R. anamalaiense.

The blooms of this plant are polygamodioecious, possessing both male and female flowers on the same plant. These flowers are relatively small, measuring 3 to 4 mm (0.12 to 0.16 in) across, and exhibit a yellowish-white hue. The male flowers are arranged in axillary panicles, while the female flowers occur in axillary spikes or racemes. Each flower consists of five sepals, which are ovate-orbicular in shape and adorned with ciliate edges; these sepals are fused in the lower half. The petals are concave and arranged in an imbricate manner. The staminal tube is globose and crenulate, housing 9–10 stamens organized in two rows. The lower stamens are included within the tube, while the upper ones are partly exserted, sometimes with apiculate tips, and the attached filaments are prominent. The ovary is positioned superiorly and is globose in shape, housing five cells, with two ovules present in each cell. The style is short and thick, culminating in a stigma that is 3–5 lobed and truncate. Following pollination, the fruit develops into a berry, which is ovoid and white, with a scaly texture. Berries are oval shaped and around 1.8 cm (0.7 in) long. Within each berry, one to two seeds can be found embedded within a pulpy aril. Flowering and fruiting typically occurs between the months of March and November.

== Distribution and habitat ==
Reinwardtiodendron anamalaiense is native to Southwest India, where it is endemic to the Western Ghats region. The species is distributed within multiple Indian states including: Maharashtra, Karnataka, Tamil Nadu, and Kerala. R. anamalaiense grows within a wet tropical climate, where it can be found growing in the subcanopy of evergreen forests. The species has been encountered growing at elevations of 1,400 metres (4,600 ft) above sea level.
