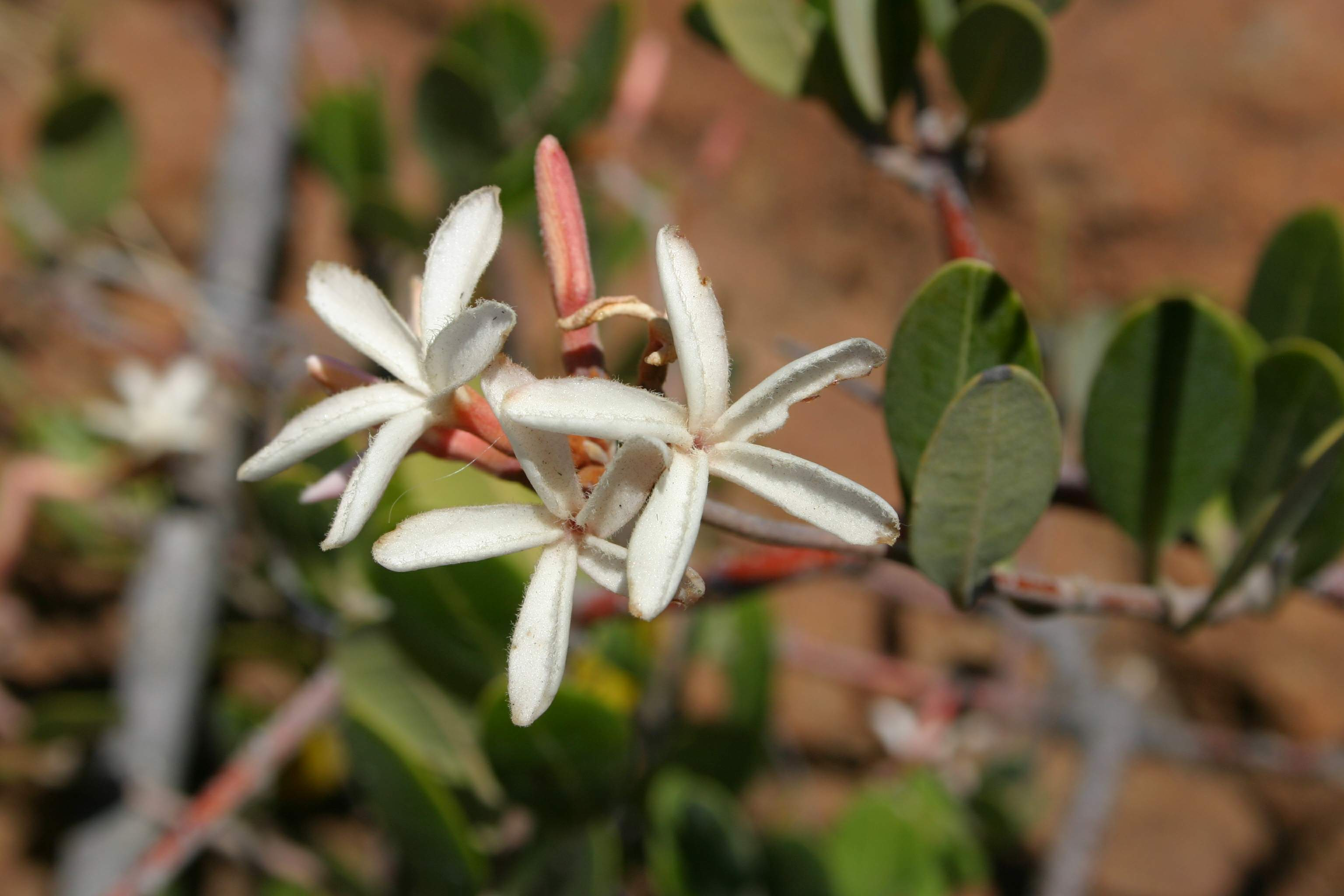

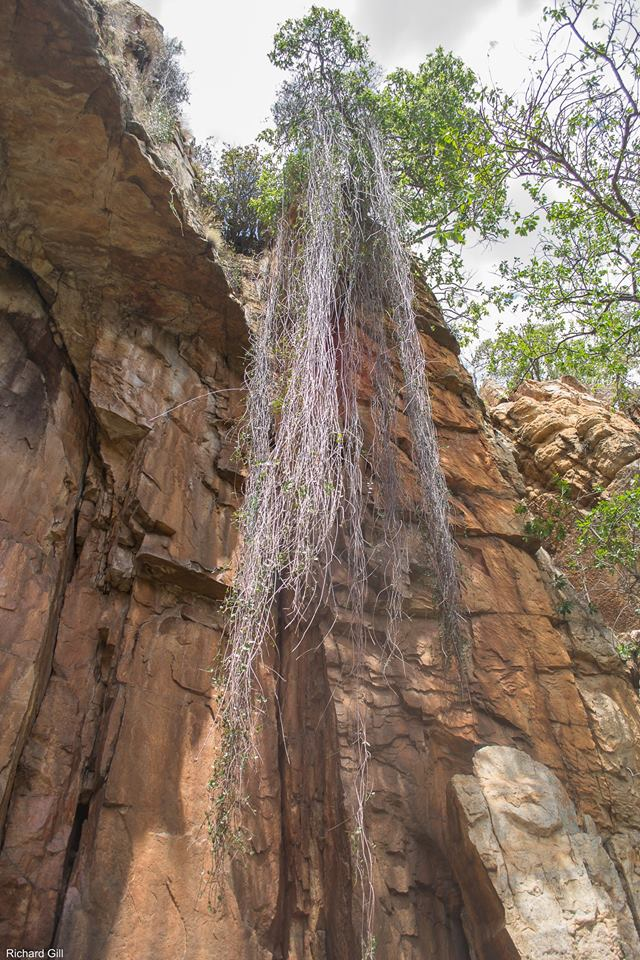
- Trailing down gorge in Magaliesberg

Scientific classification
- Kingdom: Plantae
- Clade: Tracheophytes
- Clade: Angiosperms
- Clade: Eudicots
- Clade: Asterids
- Order: Gentianales
- Family: Apocynaceae
- Genus: Ancylobothrys
- Species: A. capensis

Binomial name
- Ancylobothrys capensis (Oliv.) Pichon

Synonyms
- Landolphia capensis Oliv.; Pacouria capensis (Oliv.) S.Moore

= Ancylobothrys capensis =

Species of fruit and plant

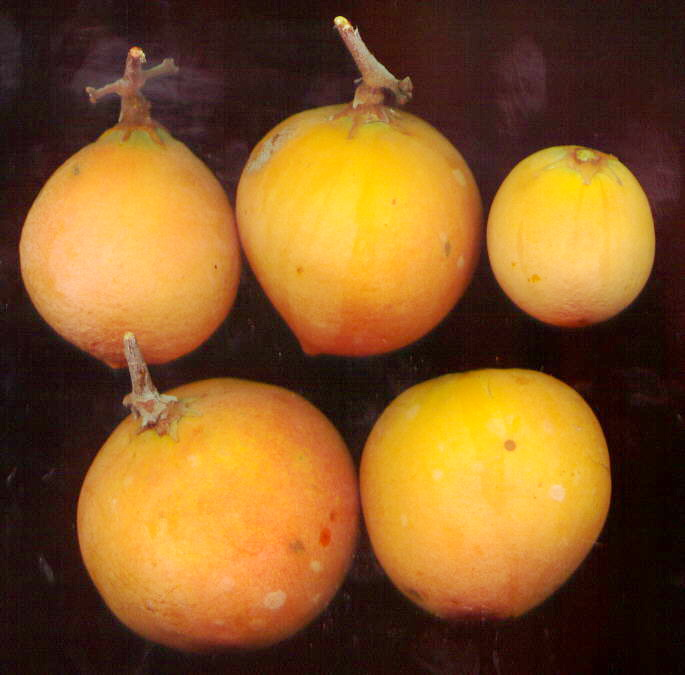

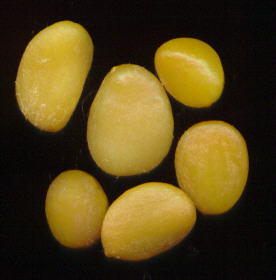

Ancylobothrys capensis, the wild apricot, is a tangled, sprawling, multi-stemmed Southern African creeper of the family Apocynaceae.

It is evergreen, often scrambling over rocks and other plants. New growth is covered in velvety, reddish-brown hairs. When damaged it exudes copious amounts of white latex. The leathery leaves are broadly elliptic, simple, opposite and erect, with prominent venation on both surfaces. Flowers are fragrant, about 40mm diameter, brilliant white when open and pinkish in bud.

The round fruit are up to 50mm in diameter, khaki-green when immature, turning bright orange or yellow when ripe. The skin is thick, soft, brittle, and easily peeled. 3-4 seeds are embedded in a sweet and acidic pulp.

The species is common and occurs in rocky areas, particularly on quartzites throughout KwaZulu-Natal, Mpumalanga, Gauteng, Limpopo Province, North West Province and Botswana.
