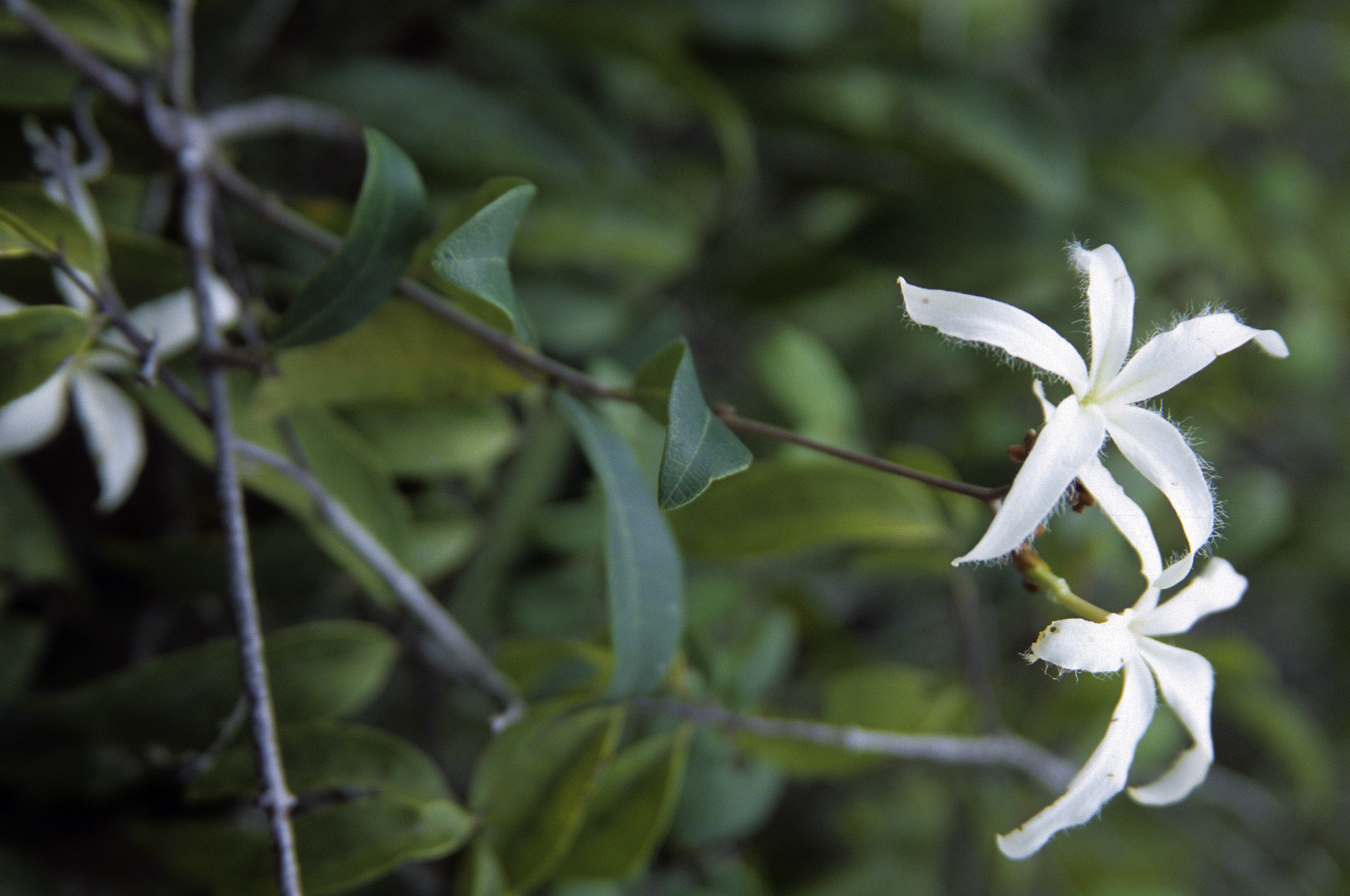
- In Mozambique

Scientific classification
- Kingdom: Plantae
- Clade: Tracheophytes
- Clade: Angiosperms
- Clade: Eudicots
- Clade: Asterids
- Order: Gentianales
- Family: Apocynaceae
- Genus: Ancylobothrys
- Species: A. petersiana

Binomial name
- Ancylobothrys petersiana (Klotzsch) Pierre

Synonyms
- List: Ancylobothrys rotundifolia (Dewèvre) Pierre; Landolphia angustifolia K.Schum ex Engl.; Landolphia monteiroi N.E. Br.; Landolphia petersiana (Klotzsch) Dyer; Landolphia senensis (Klotzsch) K.Schum; Pacouria angustifolia (K.Schum. ex Engl.) Kuntze; Pacouria petersiana (Klotzsch) S.Moore; Willughbeia petersiana Klotzsch; Willughbeia senensis Klotzsch

= Ancylobothrys petersiana =

Species of shrub

Ancylobothrys petersiana grows as a climbing shrub up to 6 metres (20 ft) tall. Its fragrant flowers feature a creamy or white corolla. Fruit is spherical, up to 6 centimetres (2.4 in) in diameter. Vernacular names include "climbing wild apricot". Habitat is woodland and rocky hillsides. A. petersiana is found in the Democratic Republic of Congo, Burundi, Somalia, Kenya, Tanzania, Malawi, Mozambique, Zimbabwe, South Africa, the Comoros and Madagascar.

The fruit contains edible pulp with a sour taste around the many seeds. It can be eaten out of hand or prepared into a sweetened juice, and it is sold in local markets for this purpose.
