= Willughbeia angustifolia =

Scientific classification
- Kingdom: Plantae
- Clade: Tracheophytes
- Clade: Angiosperms
- Clade: Eudicots
- Clade: Asterids
- Order: Gentianales
- Family: Apocynaceae
- Genus: Willughbeia
- Species: W. angustifolia

Binomial name
- Willughbeia angustifolia (Miq.) Markgr.

Synonyms
- Ancylocladus rufescens (Dyer ex Hook.f.) Kuntze; Chilocarpus brachyanthus Pierre; Urnularia rufescens (Dyer ex Hook.f.) Pichon; Vahea angustifolia Miq.; Willughbeia angustifolia var. gracilior Markgr.; Willughbeia apiculata Miq.; Willughbeia elmeri Merr.; Willughbeia rufescens Dyer ex Hook.f.; Willughbeiopsis rufescens (Dyer ex Hook.f.) Rauschert

Species of flowering plant

Willughbeia angustifolia is a species of flowering plant, a woody monoecious vine in the dogbane family, that is native to Southeast Asia.

== Name ==
Local vernacular names include gerit-gerit, gitaan, serapit and akar kubal madu.

== Description ==
The vine grows up to 60 m in height into the canopies of forest trees. The oval leaves are smooth, 2.6–20.5 cm long by 0.9–7 cm wide. The axillary inflorescences comprise short cymes of small white flowers. The fruits are round, yellow to orange berries 3–14 cm in diameter, with a latex-filled epicarp, containing small seeds embedded in a sweet orange sarcotesta.

== Distribution and habitat ==
The species occurs in the Nicobar Islands, Malay Peninsula, Singapore, Sumatra, Borneo and the Maluku Islands, where it is found in lowland and hill mixed dipterocarp forest up to an elevation of 500 m.

== Usage ==
The edible fruits are valued for their flavour, reminiscent of strawberries and raspberries, and are often sold in local markets.
