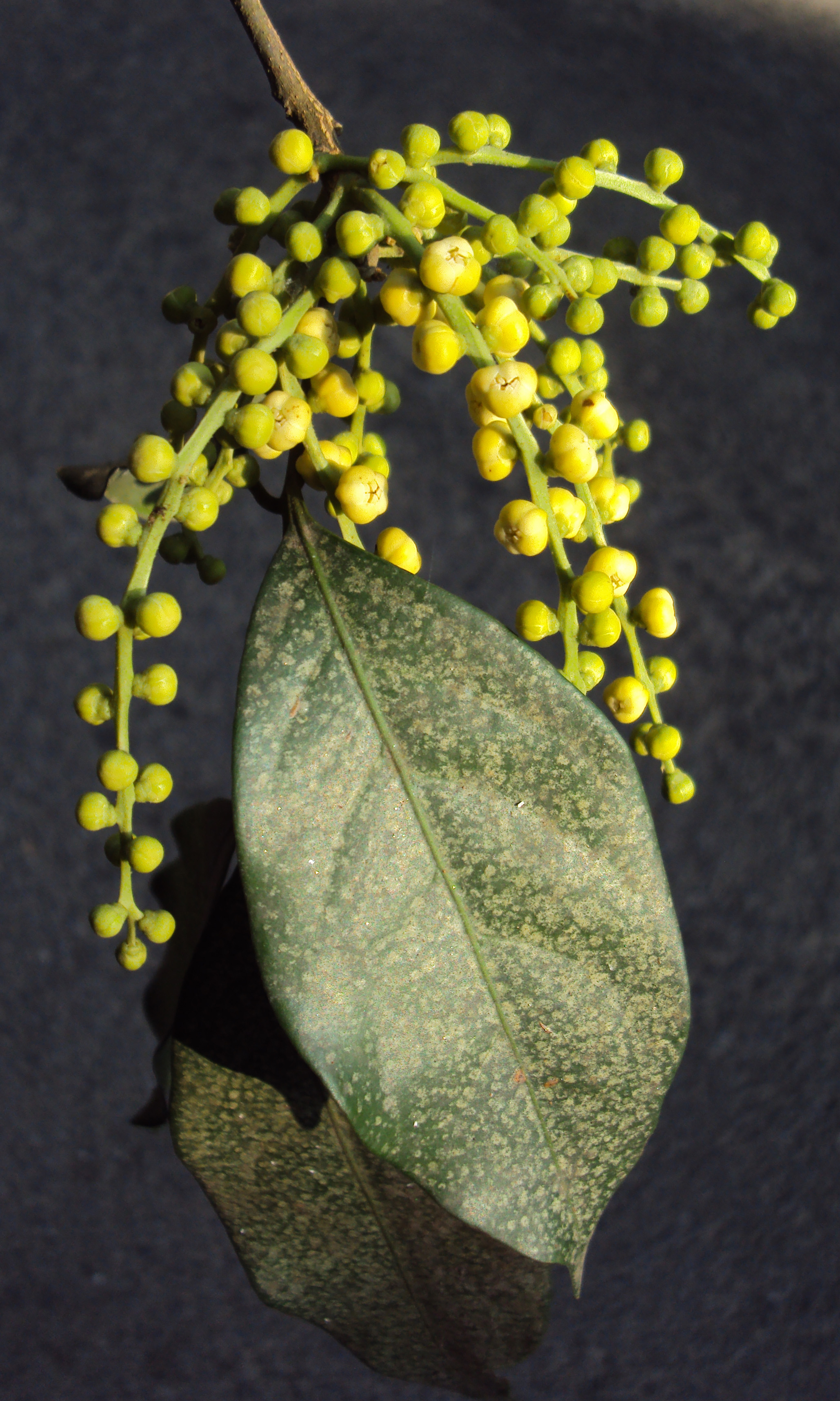
- Reinwardtiodendron anamalaiense

Scientific classification
- Kingdom: Plantae
- Clade: Tracheophytes
- Clade: Angiosperms
- Clade: Eudicots
- Clade: Rosids
- Order: Sapindales
- Family: Meliaceae
- Subfamily: Melioideae
- Genus: Reinwardtiodendron; Koord., 1898

Species
- See text

= Reinwardtiodendron =

Genus of flowering plants

Reinwardtiodendron is a genus of plants in the family Meliaceae, described by Sijfert Hendrik Koorders and found in south-east Asia. The type species is: R. celebicum Koord.

== Species ==
As of April 2024, Plants of the World Online accepted the following species:

- Reinwardtiodendron anamalaiense (Bedd.) Mabb.
- Reinwardtiodendron celebicum Koord.
- Reinwardtiodendron cinereum (Hiern) Mabb.
- Reinwardtiodendron humile (Hassk.) Mabb.
- Reinwardtiodendron kinabaluense (Kosterm.) Mabb.
- Reinwardtiodendron kostermansii (Prijanto) Mabb.
