= Willughbeia sarawacensis =

Scientific classification
- Kingdom: Plantae
- Clade: Tracheophytes
- Clade: Angiosperms
- Clade: Eudicots
- Clade: Asterids
- Order: Gentianales
- Family: Apocynaceae
- Genus: Willughbeia
- Species: W. sarawacensis

Binomial name
- Willughbeia sarawacensis Pierre (K.Schum.)

Species of fruit and plant

Willughbeia sarawacensis, commonly known as tabo (Philippines) and kubal or kubal madu (Malaysia), is a large tropical vine-bearing plant with edible fruit native to Palawan and to the nearby island of Borneo. There are four related varieties known in Borneo: kubal asam or kubal taya, kubal tusu or kubal madu, kubal arang (all fall under Willughbeia sarawakensis), and another much bigger cousin tabau (Willughbeia elimeri).

== Description ==
The fruit is the shape, size, and colour of a grapefruit with a thin melon-like rind and a concentrated sweet taste comparable to mango, soursop and pineapple combined. At the government experimental station near Kuching, Sarawak, they are grown on elevated platforms and said to start producing in less than two years. All four are round in shape except kubal tusu, which is pear-shaped. Kubal arang (charcoal) has a distinctive charcoal-coloured seed.
