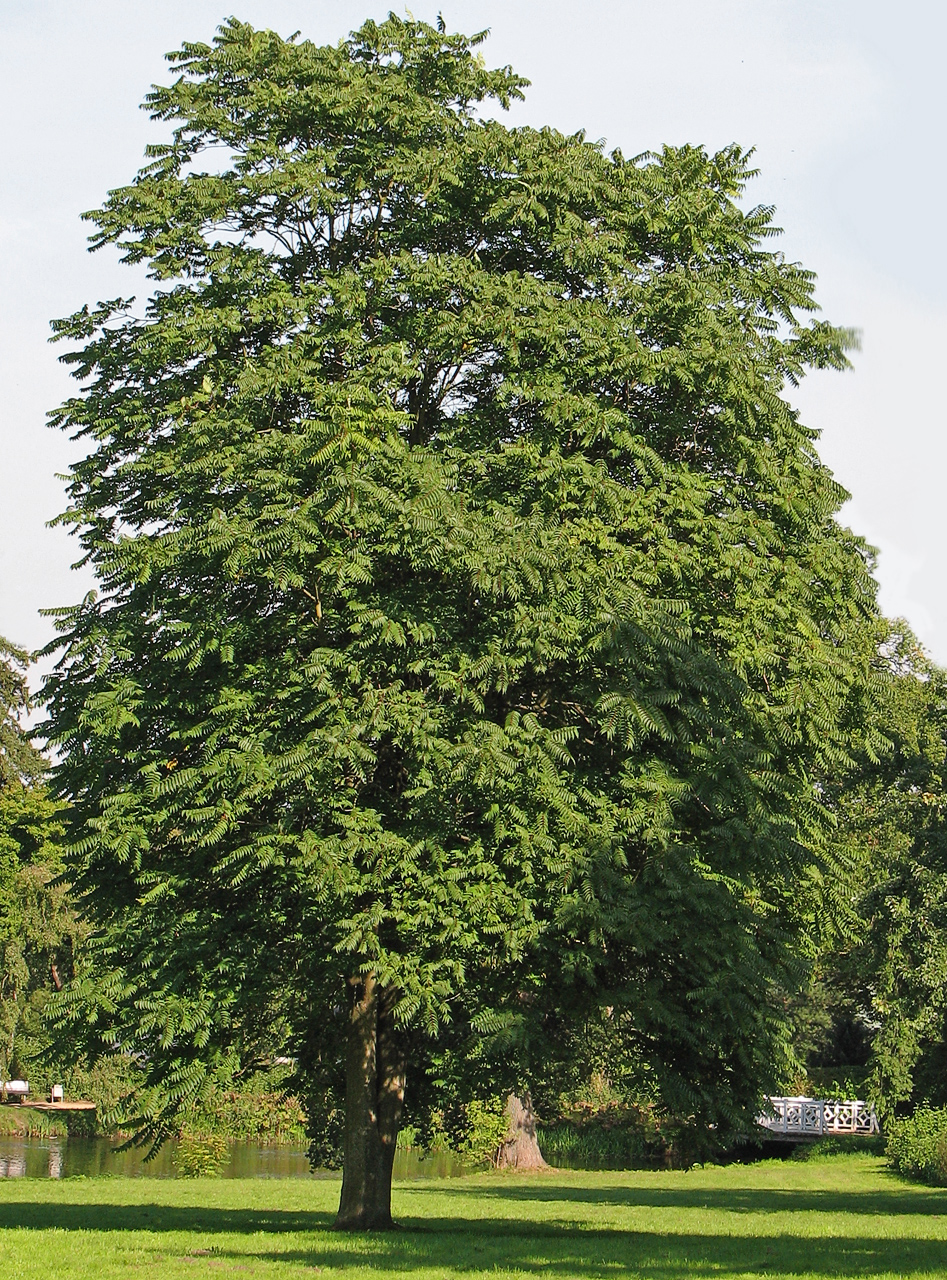
- Large specimen growing in a park in Germany

Conservation status
- Least Concern (IUCN 3.1)

Scientific classification
- Kingdom: Plantae
- Clade: Tracheophytes
- Clade: Angiosperms
- Clade: Eudicots
- Clade: Rosids
- Order: Sapindales
- Family: Simaroubaceae
- Genus: Ailanthus
- Species: A. altissima

Binomial name
- Ailanthus altissima (Mill.) Swingle

Synonyms
- List: Ailanthus cacodendron; Ailanthus erythrocarpa; Ailanthus esquirolii; Ailanthus giraldii; Ailanthus glandulosa; Ailanthus japonica; Ailanthus japonica; Ailanthus peregrina; Ailanthus pongelion; Ailanthus procera; Ailanthus rhodoptera; Ailanthus rubra; Ailanthus sinensis; Ailanthus sutchuenensis; Ailanthus vilmoriniana; Choerospondias auriculata; Pongelion cacodendron; Pongelion glandulosum; Pongelion vilmorinianum; Rhus cacodendron; Rhus sinensis; Toxicodendron altissimum

= Ailanthus altissima =

Tree of heaven

Species of tree

Ailanthus altissima (/eɪˈlænθəs ælˈtɪsɪmə/ ay-LAN-thəss al-TIH-sim-ə), commonly known as tree of heaven or ailanthus tree, is a deciduous tree in the quassia family. It is native to northeast, central China, and Taiwan. Unlike other members of the genus Ailanthus, it is found in temperate climates rather than the tropics.

The tree grows rapidly, and is capable of reaching heights of 15 metres (50 ft) in 25 years. While the species rarely lives more than 50 years, some specimens exceed 100 years of age. It is considered a noxious weed and vigorous invasive species, and one of the worst invasive plant species in Europe and North America. In 21st-century North America, the invasiveness of the species has been compounded by its role in the life cycle of the also destructive and invasive spotted lanternfly.

== Description ==
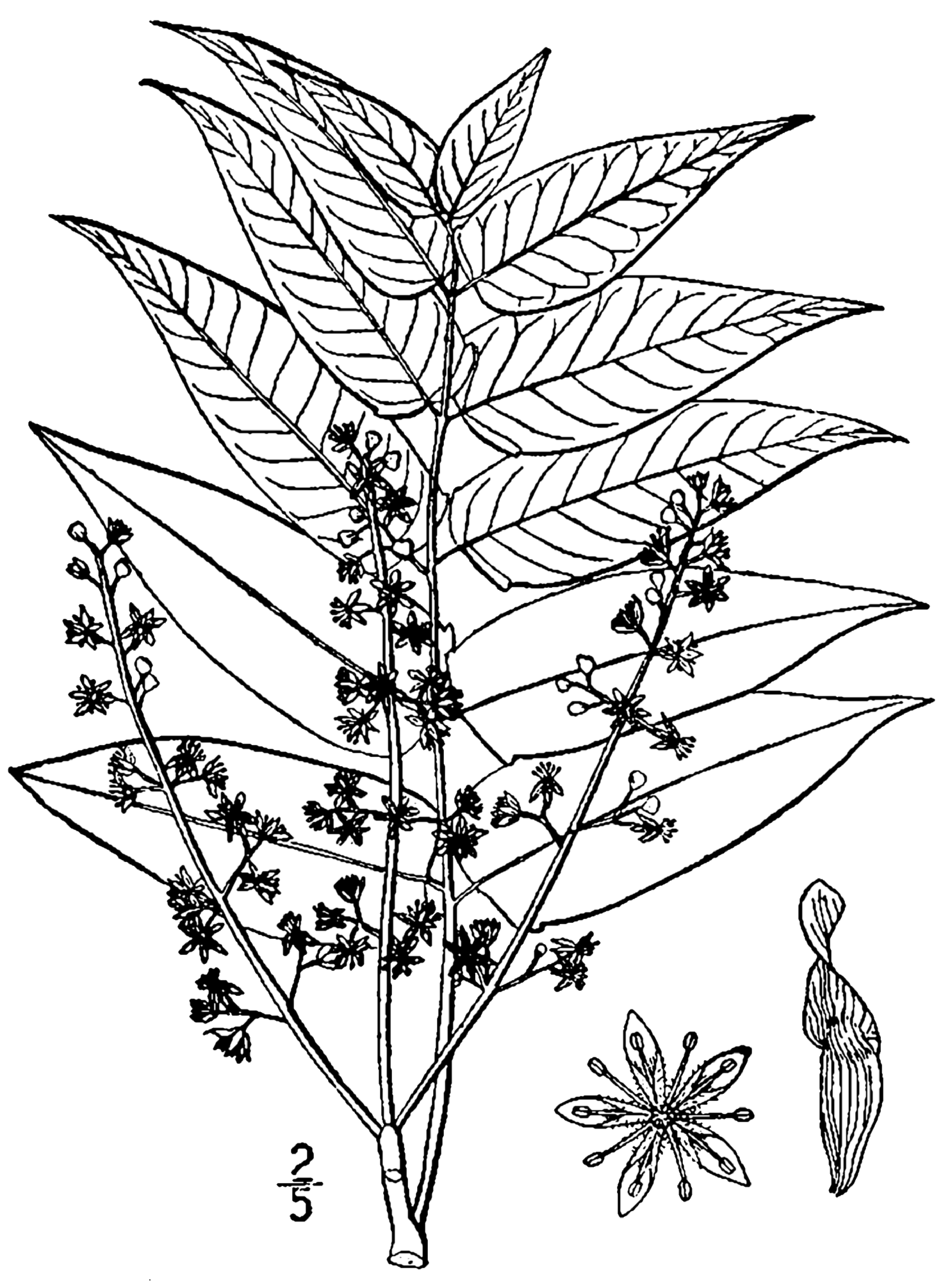
Botanical drawing of the leaves, flowers, and samaras from Britton and Brown's 1913 Illustrated flora of the northern states and Canada

Ailanthus altissima is a medium-sized tree that reaches heights between 17 and 27 m (60 and 90 ft) with a diameter at breast height of about 1 m (3 ft). The bark is smooth and light grey, often becoming somewhat rougher with light tan fissures as the tree ages. The twigs are stout, smooth to lightly pubescent, and reddish or chestnut in color. They have lenticels and heart-shaped leaf scars (i.e., a scar left on the twig after a leaf falls) with many bundle scars (i.e., small marks where the veins of the leaf once connected to the tree) around the edges.

The buds are finely pubescent, dome-shaped, and partially hidden behind the petiole, though they are completely visible in the dormant season at the sinuses of the leaf scars. The branches are light to dark gray in color, smooth, lustrous, and contain raised lenticels that become fissures with age. The ends of the branches become pendulous. All parts of the plant have a distinguishing strong odor that is often likened to peanuts, cashews, or rotting cashews.

The leaves are large, odd- or even-pinnately compound on the stem. They range in size from 30 to 90 centimetres (1 to 3 ft) in length and contain 10–41 leaflets organised in pairs, with the largest leaves found on vigorous young sprouts. When they emerge in the spring, the leaves are bronze, then quickly turn from medium to dark green as they grow. The rachis is light to reddish-green with a swollen base. The leaflets are ovate-lanceolate with entire margins, somewhat asymmetric and occasionally not directly opposite to each other. Each leaflet is 5–18 cm (2–7 in) long and 2.5–5 cm (1–2 in) wide. They have a long, tapering end, while the bases have two to four teeth, each containing one or more glands at the tip. The leaflets' upper sides are dark green in color with light green veins, while the undersides are a more whitish green. The petioles are 5–12 millimetres (0.2–0.5 in) long. The lobed bases and glands distinguish it from similar sumac species.

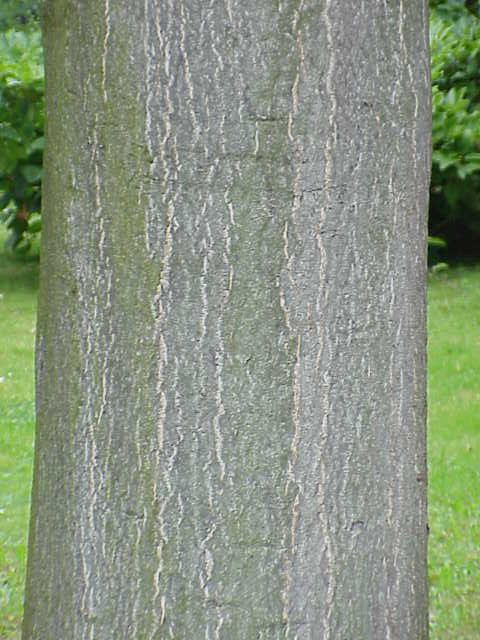
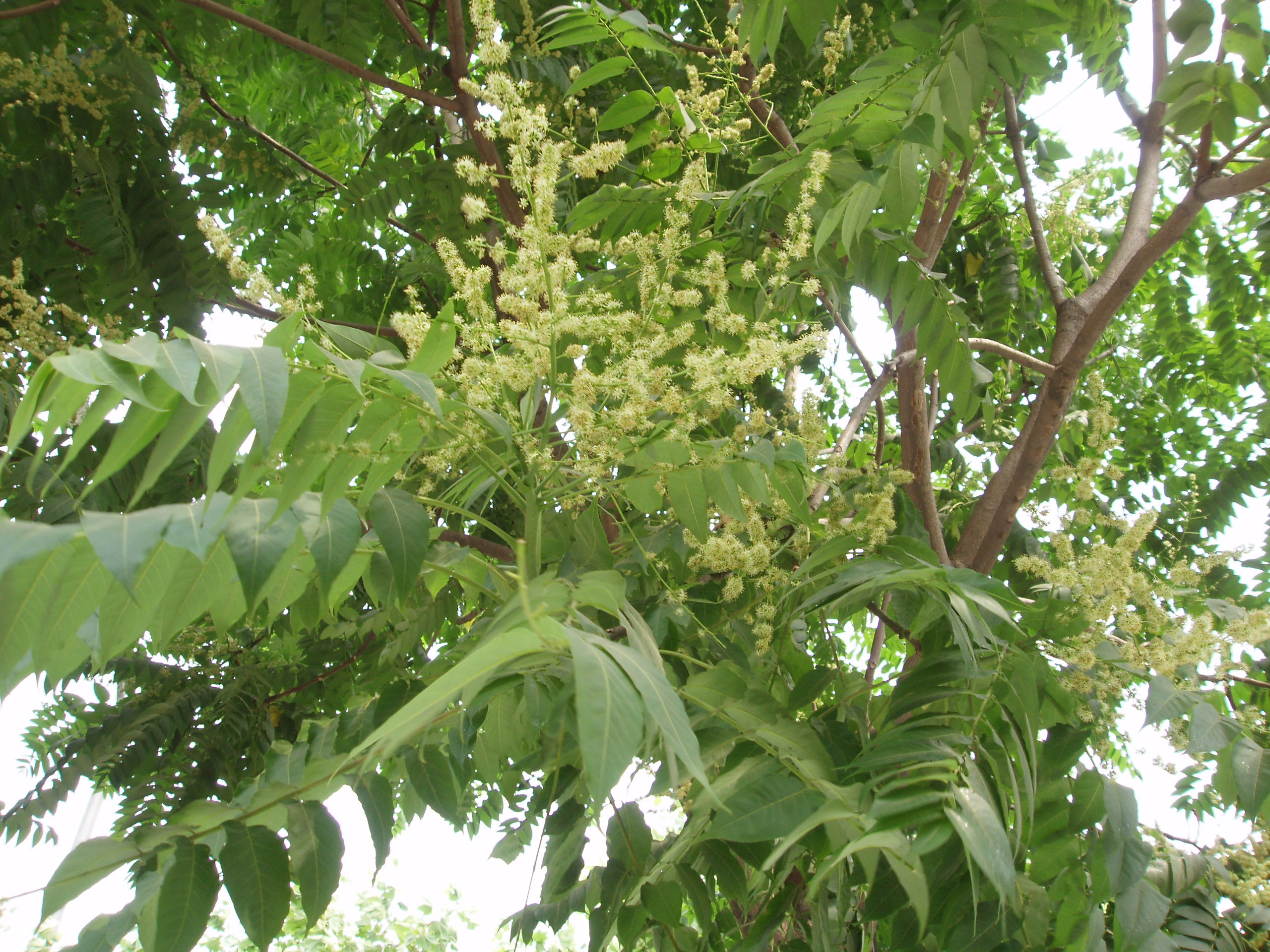
Bark and flowers of A. altissima

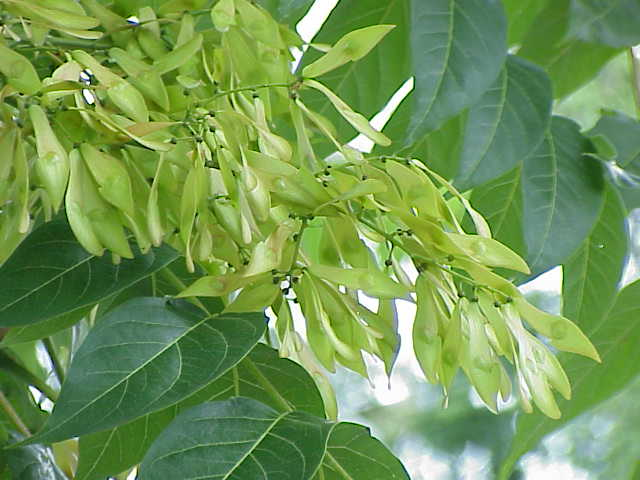
Immature seeds on a female tree

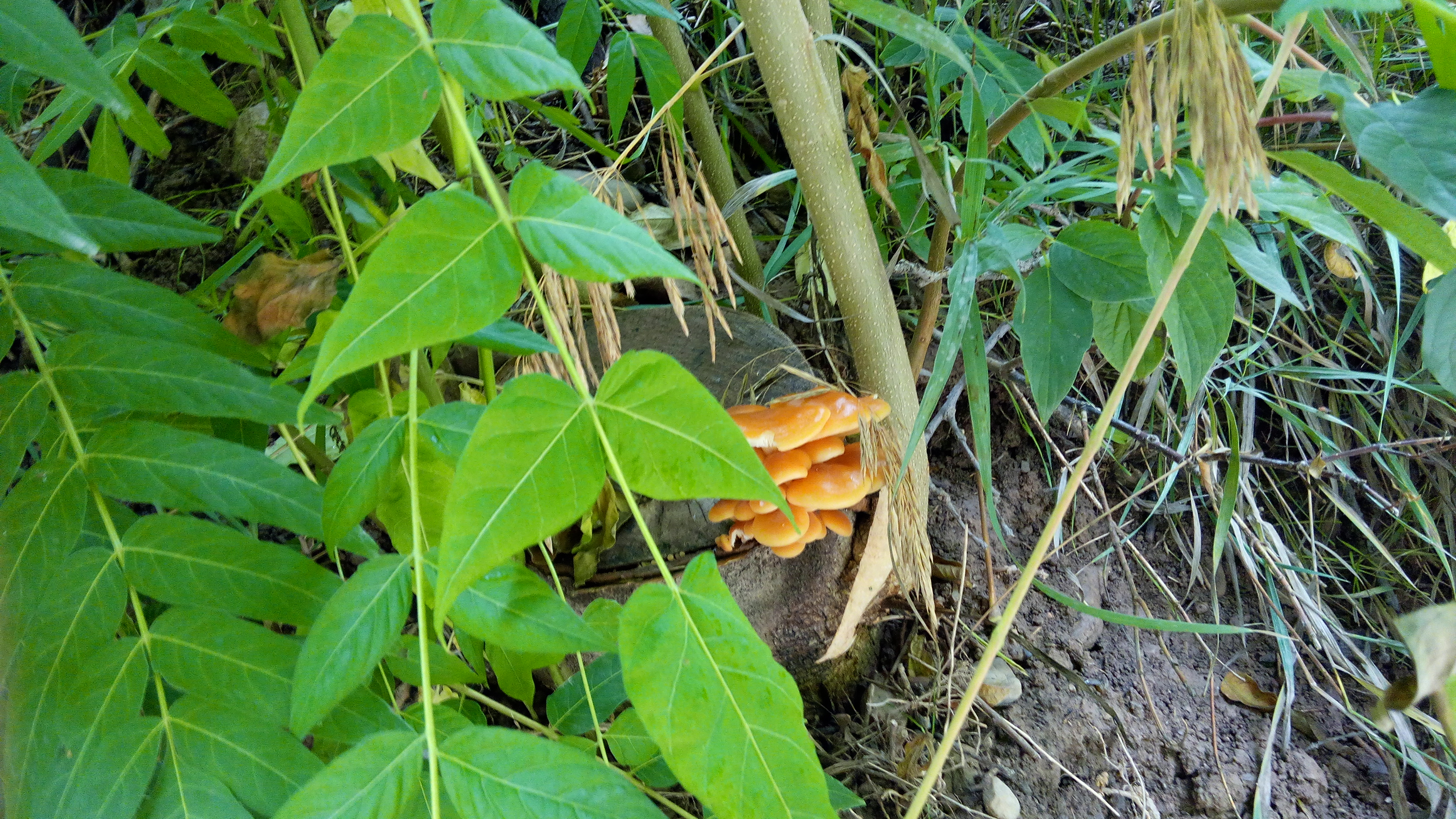
Resprouting after herbicide use

The flowers are small and appear in large panicles up to 50 cm (20 in) in length at the end of new shoots. The individual flowers are yellowish green to reddish in color, each with five petals and sepals. The sepals are cup-shaped, lobed and united while the petals are valvate (i.e., they meet at the edges without overlapping), white and hairy towards the inside. They appear from mid-April in the south of its range to July in the north. Ailanthus trees are dioecious, with male and female flowers being borne on different individuals. Male trees produce three to four times as many flowers as the females, making the male flowers more conspicuous. Furthermore, the male plants emit a foul-smelling odor while flowering to attract pollinating insects. Female flowers contain 10 (or rarely five through abortion) sterile stamens (stamenoids) with heart-shaped anthers. The pistil is made up of five free carpels (i.e., they are not fused), each containing a single ovule. Their styles are united and slender with star-shaped stigmata. The male flowers are similar in appearance, but they lack a pistil and the stamens do function, each being topped with a globular anther and a glandular green disc. The fruits grow in clusters; similar to the ash tree (Fraxinus excelsior), the fruits ripen to a bright reddish-brown color in September. A fruit cluster may contain hundreds of seeds.

The seeds borne on the female trees are 5 mm (0.2 in) in diameter and each is encapsulated in a samara that is 2.5 cm (1 in) long and 1 cm (0.4 in) broad, appearing July through August, but can persist on the tree until the next spring. The samara is large and twisted at the tips, making it spin as it falls, assisting wind dispersal, and aiding buoyancy for long-distance dispersal through hydrochory. Primary wind dispersal and secondary water dispersal are usually positively correlated in A. altissima, since most morphological characteristics of samaras affect both dispersal modes in the same way – except for the width of the samaras, which in contrast affects both types of dispersal in opposing ways, allowing differentiation in the dispersal strategies of this tree. The females can produce huge numbers of seeds, normally around 30,000 per kg, and their number can be estimated by measurement of the tree's diameter at chest height.

== History ==
The tree of heaven is mentioned in the oldest extant Chinese dictionary and listed in many Chinese medical texts for its purported curative ability. The roots, leaves, and bark are used in traditional Chinese medicine, primarily as an astringent. The tree has been grown extensively both in China and abroad as a host plant for the ailanthus silkmoth, a moth involved in silk production. Ailanthus has become a part of Western culture, as well, with the tree serving as the central metaphor and subject matter of the best-selling American novel A Tree Grows in Brooklyn by Betty Smith.

The tree was first brought from China to Europe in the 1740s, and to the United States in 1784. It was one of the first trees brought to the West during a time when chinoiserie was dominating European arts, and was initially hailed as a beautiful garden specimen. However, enthusiasm soon waned after gardeners became familiar with its suckering habits and its foul odor. Despite this, it was used extensively as a street tree during much of the 19th century.

Outside Europe and the United States, the plant has been spread to many other areas beyond its native range, and is regarded internationally as a noxious weed. In many countries, it is an invasive species due to its ability both to colonise disturbed areas quickly and to suppress competition with allelopathic chemicals. The tree also resprouts vigorously when cut, making its eradication difficult and time-consuming. This has led to its being called "tree of hell" among gardeners and conservationists.

== Taxonomy ==
The first Western scientific descriptions of the tree of heaven were made shortly after it was introduced to Europe by Pierre Nicolas d'Incarville, a French Jesuit, who had sent seeds from Peking via Siberia to his botanist friend Bernard de Jussieu in the 1740s. The seeds sent by d'Incarville were thought to be from the economically important and similar-looking Chinese varnish tree (Toxicodendron vernicifluum), which he had observed in the lower Yangtze region, rather than the tree of heaven. D'Incarville attached a note indicating this, which caused much taxonomic confusion over the next few decades. In 1751, Jussieu planted a few seeds in France and sent others on to Philip Miller, the superintendent at the Chelsea Physic Garden, and to Philip C. Webb, the owner of an exotic plant garden in Busbridge, England.

Confusion in naming began when the tree was described by all three men with three different names. In Paris, Linnaeus gave the plant the name Rhus succedanea, while it was known commonly as grand vernis du Japon. In London, the specimens were named by Miller as Toxicodendron altissima, and in Busbridge, it was dubbed in the old classification system as Rhus Sinese foliis alatis. Records exist from the 1750s of disputes over the proper name between Philip Miller and John Ellis, curator of Webb's garden in Busbridge. Rather than the issue being resolved, more names soon appeared for the plant: Jakob Friedrich Ehrhart observed a specimen in Utrecht in 1782 and named it Rhus cacodendron.

Light was shed on the taxonomic status of Ailanthus in 1788 when René Louiche Desfontaines observed the samaras of the Paris specimens, which were still labelled Rhus succedanea, and came to the conclusion that the plant was not a sumac. He published an article with an illustrated description and gave it the name Ailanthus glandulosa, placing it in the same genus as the tropical species then known as A. integrifolia (white siris, A. triphysa). The specific glandulosa, referring to the glands on the leaves, persisted until as late as 1957, but it was ultimately made invalid as a later homonym at the species level. The current species name comes from Walter T. Swingle, who was employed by the United States Department of Plant Industry. He decided to transfer Miller's older specific name into the genus of Desfontaines, resulting in the accepted name Ailanthus altissima.

Ailanthus altissima is classified in Ailanthus alongside five other east Asian and Australian species in the family Simaroubaceae.

=== Varieties ===
The three varieties of A. altissima are:

==== Ailanthus altissima var. altissima ====
The autonymic variety which is native to mainland China.

==== Ailanthus altissima var. sutchuenensis ====
This variety is native to southeast and south central China. It differs from the other varieties in having red branchlets.

==== Ailanthus altissima var. tanakae ====
Variety tanakae is endemic to northern Taiwan. It differs from the type in having yellowish bark, odd-pinnate leaves that are also shorter on average at 45 to 60 cm (18 to 24 in) long with only 13–25 scythe-like leaflets. It is listed as endangered in the IUCN Red List of threatened species due to loss of habitat for building and industrial plantations.

=== Synonyms ===
Ailanthus altissima has 43 synonyms of the species or one of its varieties.

Table of Synonyms
Name	Year	Rank	Synonym of:	Notes
Ailanthus altissima f. erythrocarpa (Carrière) Rehder	1949	form	var. altissima	= het.
Ailanthus altissima var. erythrocarpa (Carrière) Rehder	1927	variety	var. altissima	= het.
Ailanthus altissima var. leucoxyla B.C.Ding & T.B.Chao	1980	variety	var. altissima	= het.
Ailanthus altissima var. microphylla B.C.Ding & T.B.Chao	1980	variety	var. altissima	= het.
Ailanthus altissima var. pendulifolia (Dippel) Rehder	1927	variety	var. altissima	= het.
Ailanthus altissima f. pendulifolia (Dippel) Rehder	1949	form	var. altissima	= het.
Ailanthus altissima var. ramosissima B.C.Ding & T.B.Chao	1980	variety	var. altissima	= het.
Ailanthus altissima f. rubra (H.Jaeger) Geerinck	2002	form	var. altissima	= het.
Ailanthus cacodendron (Ehrh.) Schinz & Thell.	1912	species	var. altissima	= het.
Ailanthus cacodendron var. sutchuenensis (Dode) Rehder & E.H.Wilson	1914	variety	var. sutchuenensis	≡ hom.
Ailanthus erythrocarpa Carrière	1867	species	var. altissima	= het.
Ailanthus esquirolii H.Lév.	1915	species	var. altissima	= het.
Ailanthus giraldii Dode	1907	species	var. altissima	= het.
Ailanthus giraldii var. duclouxii Dode	1907	variety	var. altissima	= het.
Ailanthus glandulosa Desf.	1788	species	var. altissima	= het.
Ailanthus glandulosa f. erythocarpa (Carrière) C.K.Schneid.	1907	form	var. altissima	= het.
Ailanthus glandulosa var. erythocarpa (Carrière) Mouill.	1891	variety	var. altissima	= het.
Ailanthus glandulosa foliis-variegatis Oudem.	1866		var. altissima	= het.
Ailanthus glandulosa var. pendula G.Nicholson	1902	variety	var. altissima	= het., nom. nud.
Ailanthus glandulosa var. pendulifolia (Dippel) Carrière ex Rehder	1900	variety	var. altissima	= het.
Ailanthus glandulosa f. pendulifolia Dippel	1892	form	var. altissima	= het.
Ailanthus glandulosa f. rubra (H.Jaeger) Dippel	1892	form	var. altissima	= het.
Ailanthus glandulosa var. spinosa M.Vilm. & Bois	1904	variety	var. altissima	= het.
Ailanthus glandulosa var. sutchuenensis (Dode) Rehder	1912	variety	var. sutchuenensis	≡ hom.
Ailanthus glandulosa var. tanakae Hayata	1914	variety	var. tanakae	≡ hom.
Ailanthus japonica K.Koch	1869	species	var. altissima	= het., not validly publ.
Ailanthus japonica Dippel	1892	species	var. altissima	= het.
Ailanthus peregrina F.A.Barkley	1937	species	var. altissima	= het.
Ailanthus pongelion J.F.Gmel.	1791	species	var. altissima	= het.
Ailanthus procera Salisb.	1796	species	var. altissima	= het.
Ailanthus rhodoptera F.Muell.	1862	species	var. altissima	= het.
Ailanthus rubra H.Jaeger	1884	species	var. altissima	= het.
Ailanthus sinensis Dum.Cours.	1811	species	var. altissima	= het., nom. superfl.
Ailanthus sutchuenensis Dode	1907	species	var. sutchuenensis	≡ hom.
Ailanthus vilmoriniana Dode	1904	species	var. altissima	= het.
Ailanthus vilmoriniana var. henanensis Jian Y.Chen & L.Y.Jin	1990	variety	var. altissima	= het.
Choerospondias auriculata D.Chandra	1978	species	var. altissima	= het.
Pongelion cacodendron (Ehrh.) Farw.	1930	species	var. altissima	= het.
Pongelion glandulosum (Desf.) Pierre	1894	species	var. altissima	= het.
Pongelion vilmorinianum (Dode) Tiegh.	1906	species	var. altissima	= het., nom. provis.
Rhus cacodendron Ehrh.	1783	species	var. altissima	= het.
Rhus sinensis Houtt.	1774	species	var. altissima	= het., pro syn.
Toxicodendron altissimum Mill.	1768	species	A. altissima	≡ hom.
Notes: ≡ homotypic synonym; = heterotypic synonym

=== Names ===
The genus name Ailanthus is derived from the Ambonese word ailanto, meaning "heaven-tree" or "tree reaching for the sky". They use this name for the evergreen tree Ailanthus integrifolia. Altissima is Botanical Latin for "tallest" or "very tall". Though the name ailanthus is used for the genus as a whole it is also used to mean this species as an English common name or in the form ailanthus tree. The species is also commonly called tree of heaven, a name in use since 1845.

It is sometimes called Chinese sumac, however this name is also frequently applied to the sumac species Rhus chinensis. Similarly, varnish tree is rarely listed as one of its alternate names, but this name is more often applied to other species such as Toxicodendron vernicifluum and Aleurites moluccana. This is also the case with copal tree, which is used as a common name for the new world Hymenaea courbaril and Vateria indica from India. The strong odor of the tree is a likely inspiration for the name stinking sumac, though again a true sumac, Rhus aromatica, is also known by this name. Lastly the alternate name paradise tree is used for it and also for Simarouba glauca.

It is derisively called the ghetto palm due to its frequency in economically impoverished areas. Other disparaging names include tree of hell for its invasive and unruly qualities and cum tree for the distinctive smell of the pollen producing flowers.

In Chinese it is known as chou chun (Chinese: 臭椿; pinyin: chòuchūn).

== Distribution and habitat ==
Ailanthus altissima is native to northern and central China, Taiwan, and northern Korea. Fossil records indicate that the species was distributed as far west as Poland and Turkey in the Miocene period more than 5 million years ago. In Taiwan it is present as var. takanai. In China it is native to every province except Hainan, Heilongjiang, Jilin, Ningxia, and Qinghai. It has been introduced in many regions across the world, and is found on every continent except Antarctica.

The tree prefers moist and loamy soils but is adaptable to a very wide range of soil conditions and pH values. It is drought-hardy, but not tolerant of flooding. It also does not tolerate deep shade. In China, it is often found in limestone-rich areas. The tree of heaven is found within a wide range of climatic conditions. In its native range, it is found at high altitudes in Taiwan. It is present virtually everywhere in the U.S., but especially in arid regions bordering the Great Plains, very wet regions in the southern Appalachians, cold areas of the lower Rocky Mountains, and throughout much of the California Central Valley, forming dense thickets that displace native plants. Prolonged cold and snow cover cause dieback, although the trees resprout from the roots.

=== As an exotic plant ===
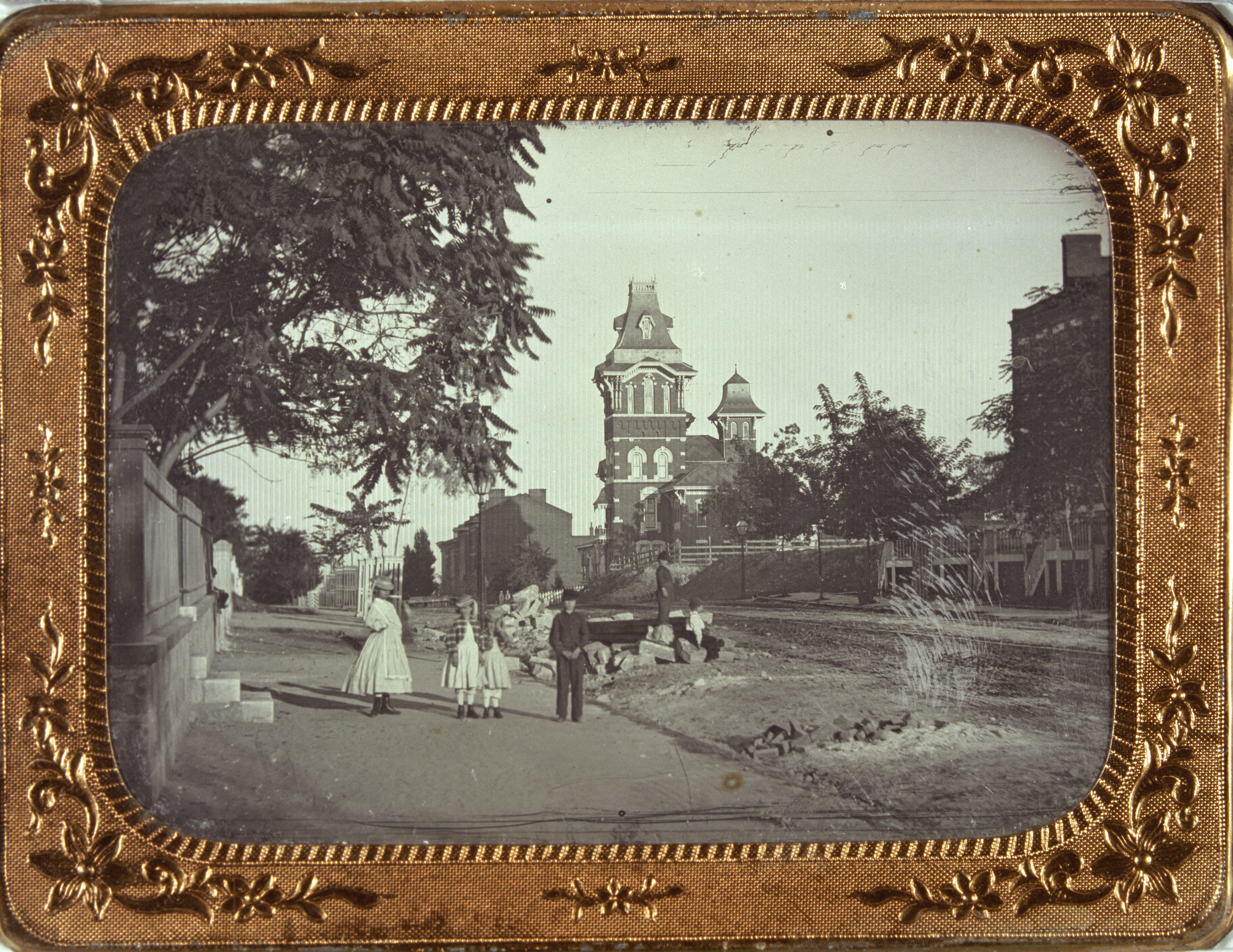
Ailanthus altissima (at left and far right) on Chouteau Avenue in St. Louis, Missouri in 1866

The earliest introductions of A. altissima to countries outside of its native range were to the southern areas of Korea and to Japan. It is possible the tree may be native to these areas, but is generally agreed to have been a very early introduction. Within China, it has also been naturalized beyond its native range in areas such as Qinghai, Ningxia, and Xinjiang.

In 1784, not long after Jussieu had sent seeds to England, some were forwarded to the United States by William Hamilton, a gardener in Philadelphia. In both Europe and America, it quickly became a favored ornamental, especially as a street tree, and by 1840, it was available in most nurseries. The Tree of Heaven was brought to California by Chinese immigrants who came during the California Gold Rush of the 1850s.

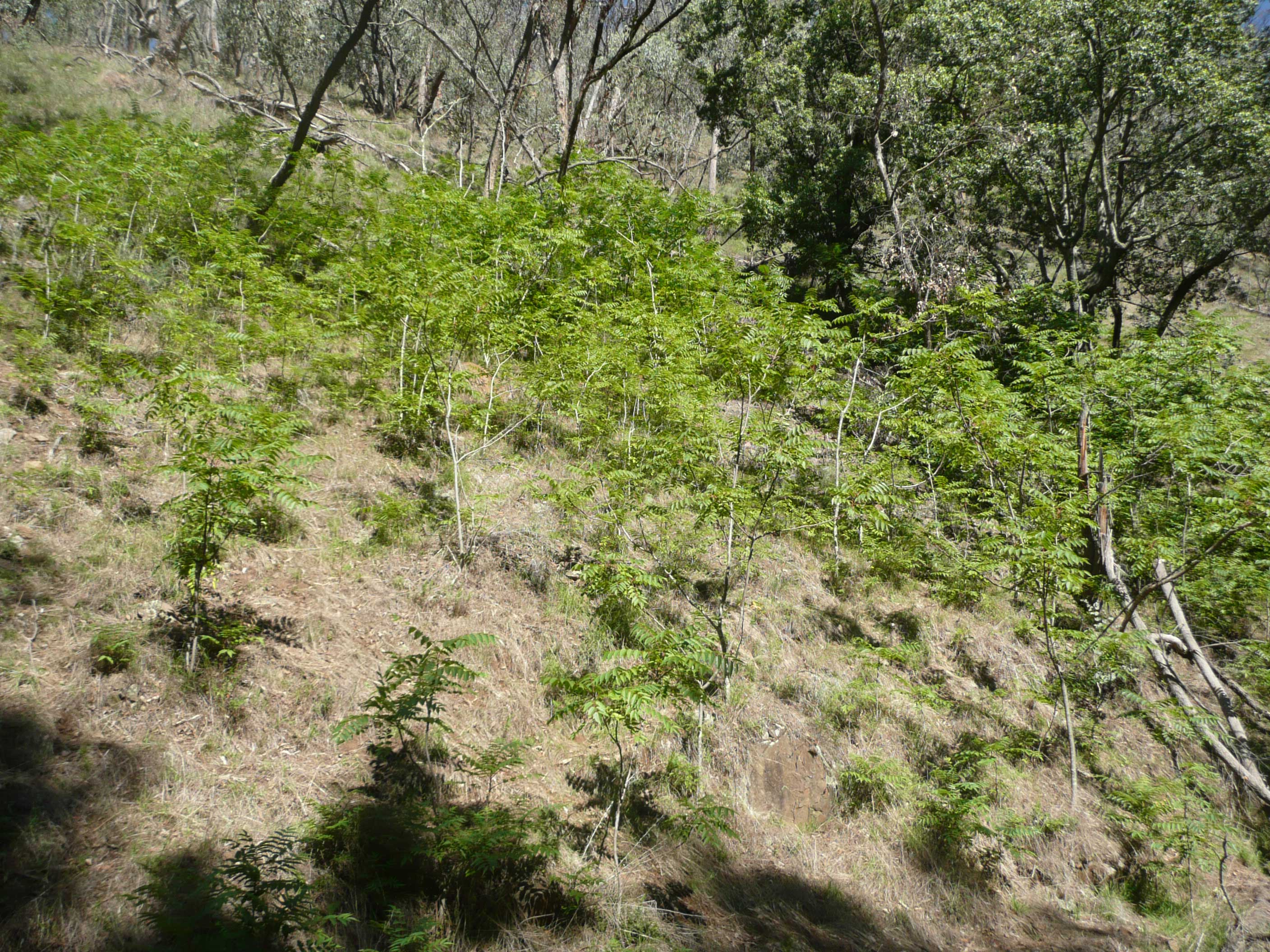
Ailanthus altissima growing in Australia.

Ailanthus trees have escaped cultivation in all areas where it was introduced, most extensively in the United States. It has naturalized across much of Europe, from as far east as Ukraine and Poland. It is found in every continental country to the west except for the Netherlands and Denmark. It also grows in Great Britain including England, Wales, and Scotland. Due to the significant negative impacts of its introduction to the ecosystem, the European Union has included it in the list of invasive alien species of Union concern and hence it cannot be imported, bred, transported, commercialized, or intentionally released into the environment in any of its member states.

It has naturalized on the southern shores of the Mediterranean basin in the North African countries of Morocco, Algeria, Tunisia, and Libya, but not in Egypt. In the Middle East it is now present in Jordan and Iraq and northwards into the northern Caucasus. Many sources including Plants of the World Online and World Flora Online list ailanthus trees as introduced to the south Asian countries of India and Pakistan, but the botanist Michael Hassler lists the species as native to these countries. Hassler also lists it as native to Vietnam, the Solomon Islands, and the Indonesian islands of Borneo, Sulawesi, Java, the Lesser Sunda Islands, and the Moluccas in contrast to other sources.

It has spread to limited areas of Oceania. It is listed as a weed in the Australian states New South Wales and Victoria and present in six states or territories in total. Similarly, it is listed in the New Zealand 2020 National Pest Plant Accord and the list of environmental weeds published in 2024. It has also been recorded in Hawaii having been first planted there in 1924.

South of the Sahara in Africa it is only found in South Africa and Lesotho with South Africa listing it as a species that must be controlled, or removed and destroyed. Likewise it grows in southern countries in South America including northern Argentina, Uruguay, and central Chile and its pacific archipielago the Juan Fernández Islands.

In North America, ailanthus trees are present from Massachusetts in the east, west to southern Ontario, southwest to Iowa, south to Texas, and east to the north of Florida. In the west, it is found from New Mexico west to California and north to Washington. In the east of its range, it grows most extensively in disturbed areas of cities, where it was long ago present as a planted street tree. In a 2003 study in North Carolina it was found to be more strongly associated with railways and highways than with rivers and expanding quickly into uncolonized areas. Similarly, another survey conducted in southwestern Virginia determined that the tree of heaven is thriving along roughly 30% of the state's interstate highway system length. It sometimes enters undisturbed areas as well, and competes with native plants. In western North America, it is most common in mountainous areas around old dwellings and abandoned mining operations. It is classified as a noxious or invasive plant on National Forest System lands and in many states.

== Ecology ==
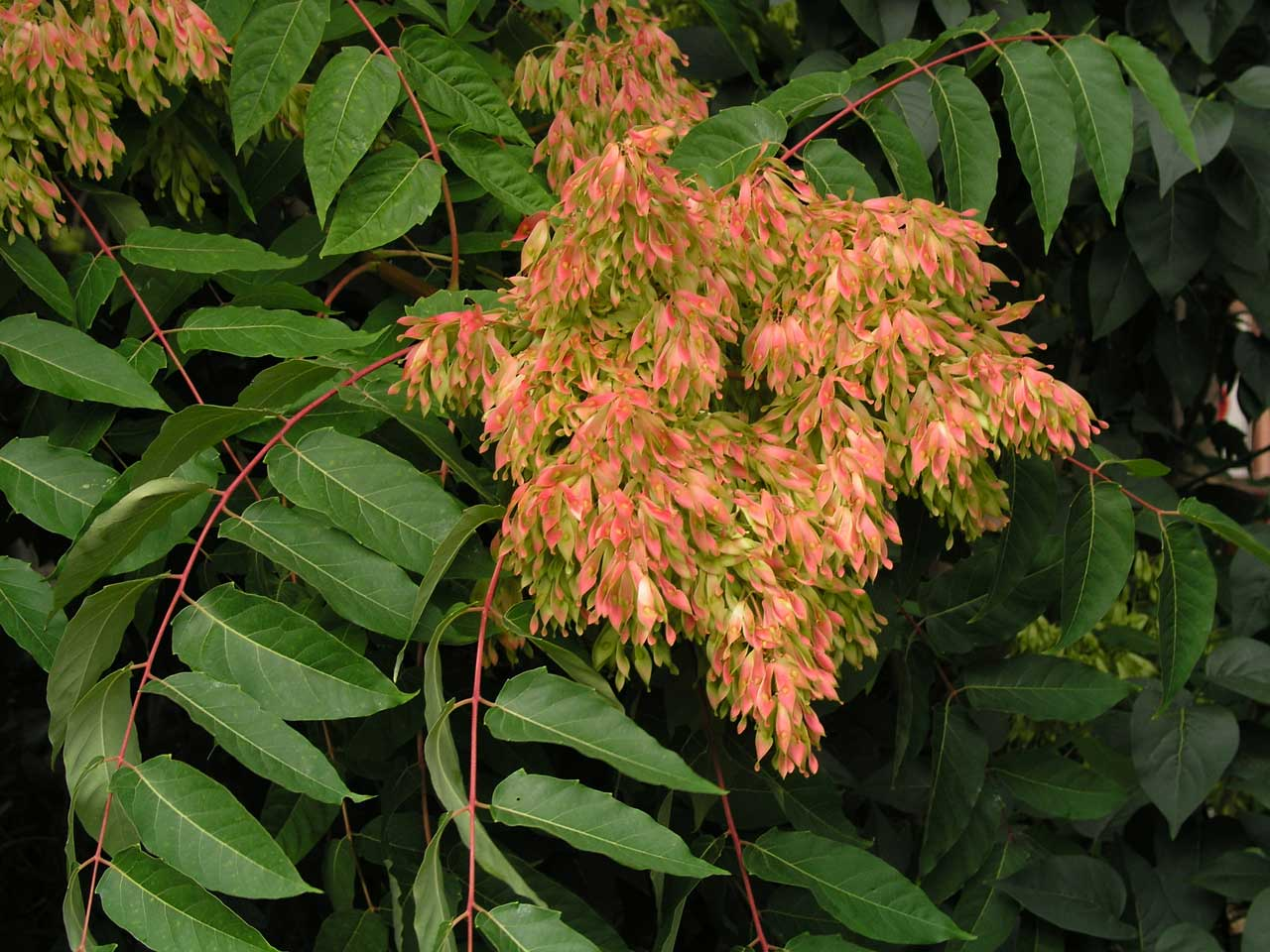
A female bearing a heavy load of seeds in Valladolid, Spain

The tree of heaven is an opportunistic plant that thrives in full sun and disturbed areas. It spreads aggressively both by seeds and vegetatively by root sprouts, re-sprouting rapidly after being cut. It is considered a shade-intolerant tree and cannot compete in low-light situations, though it is sometimes found competing with hardwoods. Such competition indicates it was present at the time the stand was established. On the other hand, a study in an old-growth hemlock–hardwood forest in New York found that ailanthus tree are capable of competing successfully with native trees in canopy gaps where only 2-15% of full sun was available. The same study characterised the tree as using a "gap-obligate" strategy to reach the forest canopy, meaning it grows rapidly during a very short period rather than growing slowly over a long period. It is a short-lived tree in any location with trees usually living 30 to 50 years, but exceptional individuals older than 100 years that are healthy and producing seed are known from studies. Among tree species, Ailanthus is among the most tolerant of pollution, including sulfur dioxide, which it absorbs in its leaves. It can withstand cement dust and fumes from coal tar operations, as well as resist ozone exposure relatively well. Furthermore, high concentrations of mercury have been found built up in tissues of the plant.

Ailanthus has been used to re-vegetate areas where acid mine drainage has occurred and it has been shown to tolerate pH levels as low as 4.1 (approximately that of tomato juice). It can withstand very low phosphorus levels and high salinity levels. The drought tolerance of the tree is strong due to its root system's effective water storage. It is frequently found in areas where few trees can survive. The roots are also aggressive enough to damage subterranean sewers and pipes. Along highways, it often forms dense thickets in which few other tree species are present, largely due to the toxins it produces to prevent competition.

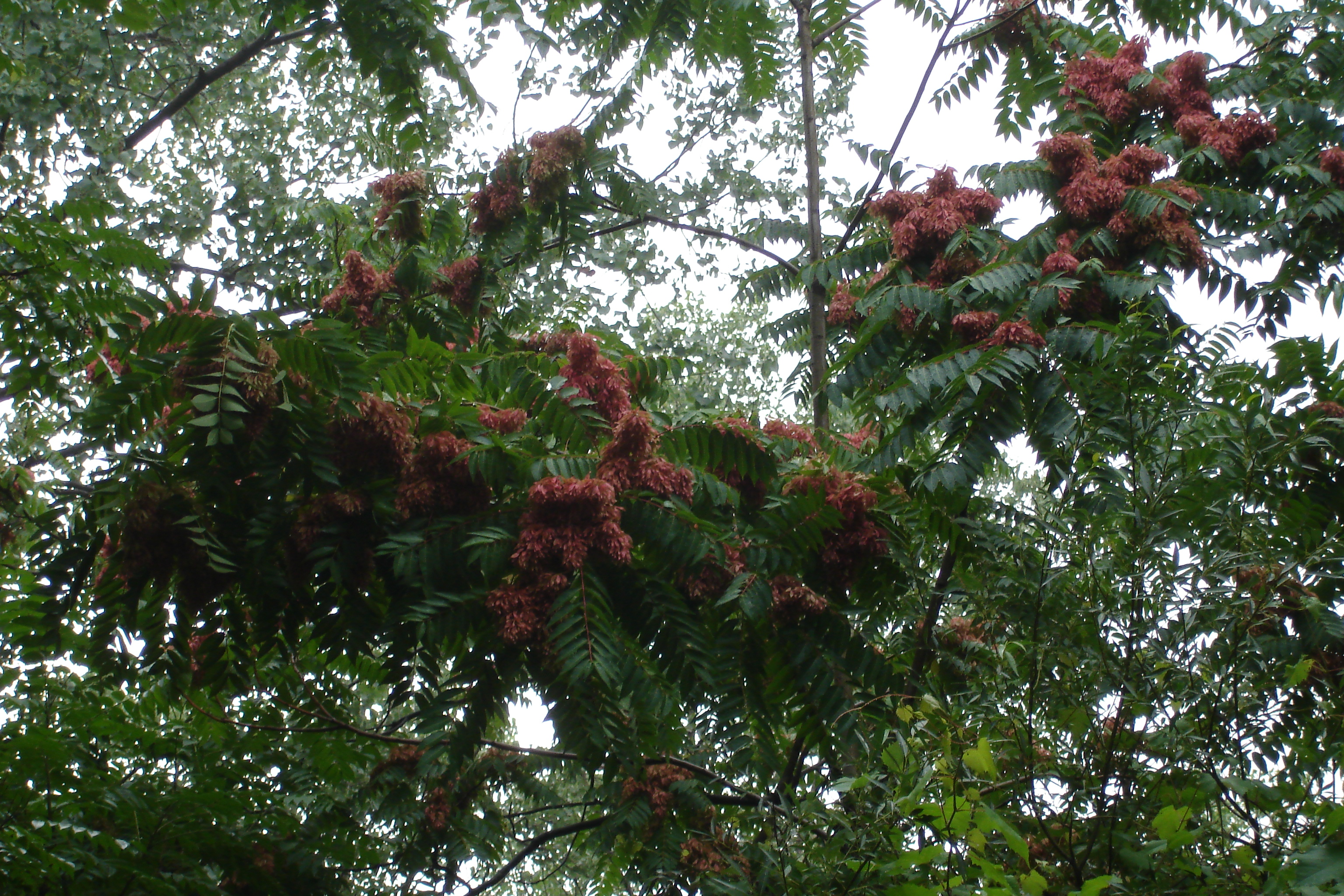
Female tree growing in Chicago, Illinois

Ailanthus trees produce an allelopathic chemical called ailanthone, which inhibits the growth of other plants. The inhibitors are strongest in the bark and roots, but are also present in the leaves, wood and seeds of the plant. One study showed that a crude extract of the root bark inhibited 50% of a sample of garden cress (Lepidium sativum) seeds from germinating. The same study tested the extract as an herbicide on garden cress, redroot pigweed (Amaranthus retroflexus), velvetleaf (Abutilon theophrasti), yellow bristlegrass (Setaria pumila), barnyard grass (Echinochloa crusgalli), pea (Pisum sativum cv. Sugar Snap), and maize (Zea mays cv. Silver Queen). It proved able to kill nearly 100% of seedlings with the exception of velvetleaf, which showed some resistance. Another experiment showed that a water extract of the chemical was either lethal or highly damaging to 11 North American hardwoods and 34 conifers, with the white ash (Fraxinus americana) being the only plant not adversely affected. The chemical does not, however, affect the tree of heaven's own seedlings, indicating that A. altissima has a defence mechanism to prevent autotoxicity. Resistance in various plant species has been shown to increase with exposure. Populations without prior exposure to the chemicals are most susceptible to them. Seeds produced from exposed plants have also been shown to be more resistant than their unexposed counterparts.

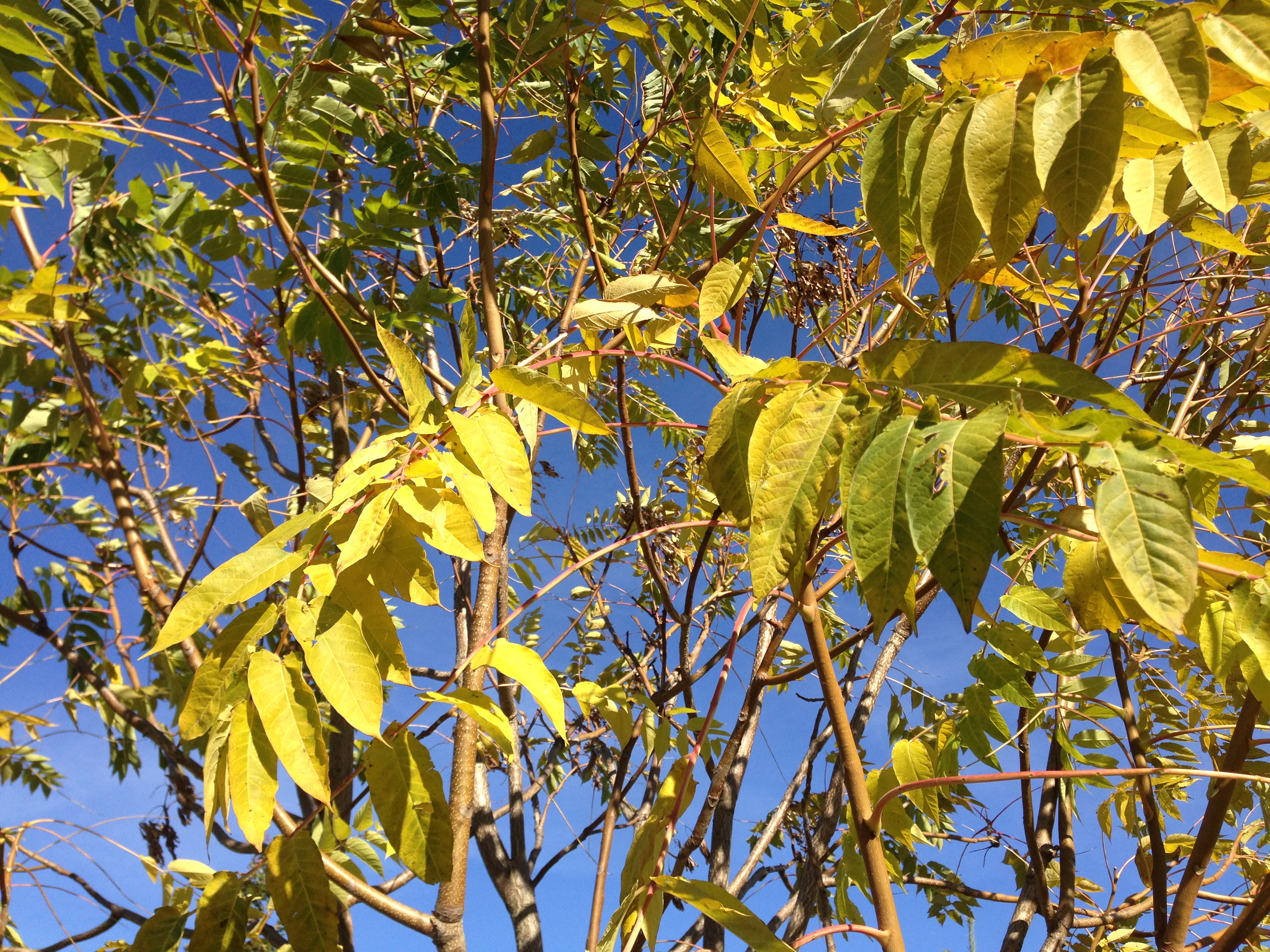
Leaves in autumn

The tree of heaven is a very rapidly growing tree, possibly the fastest-growing tree in North America. Growth of 1 to 2 metres (3 to 7 ft) per year for the first four years is considered normal. Shade considerably hampers growth rates. Older trees, while growing much slower, still do so faster than other trees. Studies found that Californian trees grew faster than their East Coast counterparts, and American trees in general grew faster than Chinese ones.

In northern Europe the tree of heaven was not considered naturalised in cities until after the Second World War. This has been attributed to the tree's ability to colonise areas of rubble of destroyed buildings where most other plants would not grow. In addition, the warmer microclimate in cities offers a more suitable habitat than the surrounding rural areas; it is thought that the tree requires a mean annual temperature of 8 °C (46 °F) to grow well, which limits its spread in more northern and higher-altitude areas. For example, one study in Germany found the tree of heaven growing in 92% of densely populated areas of Berlin, 25% of its suburbs and only 3% of areas outside the city altogether. In other areas of Europe this is not the case as climates are mild enough for the tree to flourish. It has colonised natural areas in Hungary, for example, and is considered a threat to biodiversity at that country's Aggtelek National Park.

Due to the tree of heaven's weedy habit, landowners and other organisations often resort to various methods of control to keep its populations in check. For example, the city of Basel in Switzerland has an eradication program for the tree. It can be very difficult to eradicate, however. Means of eradication can be physical, thermal, managerial, biological or chemical. A combination of several of these can be most effective, though they must of course be compatible. All have some positive and negative aspects, but the most effective regimen is generally a mixture of chemical and physical control. It involves the application of foliar or basal herbicides to kill existing trees, while either hand pulling or mowing seedlings to prevent new growth. (Note: For a more thorough discussion, see the entry for Ailanthus altissima in the Wikimanual of Gardening at Wikibooks.)

Ongoing research into the use of verticillium wilt, caused by Verticillium nonalfalfae, has resulted in the discovery of a strain of wilt that preferentially attacks ailanthus trees, though as of 2024 no commercial bioherbicide has been developed.

=== Predators ===
Several species of Lepidoptera use the leaves of Ailanthus as food, including the Indian moon moth (Actias selene), cobra moths (Attacus spp.) and the common grass yellow (Eurema hecabe). In North America the tree is the host plant for the ailanthus webworm (Atteva aurea), though this ermine moth is native to Central and South America and originally used other members of the mostly tropical Simaroubaceae as its hosts. In the US, it has been found to host the brown marmorated stink bug and the Asiatic shot-hole borer (Euwallacea validus). The spotted lanternfly (Lycorma delicatula) prefers the ailanthus tree as a host species for the completion of its lifecycle, but does not depend upon it. The insect may use quassinoid compounds absorbed from feeding on the trees as a chemical defense against birds and the wide distribution of the ailanthus is part of their rapid spread outside of China. It is an invasive species of insect first seen in the United States in 2014. They have spread from southeastern Pennsylvania to 17 eastern states causing significant damage to orchards, vineyards, and forests. Removing the tree is an important management avenue for reducing populations of the insect in an area. Because of their attraction to the trees, they are also used to detect populations of the lanternfly in new areas. The ailanthus tree is also used in Integrated Pest Management by treating trap trees with insecticides to reduce their population and minimizing the effects on other species. In its native range ailanthus trees are associated with at least 32 species of arthropods and 13 species of fungi.

The roots are poisonous to humans according to Elbert Luther Little. Other parts are also suspected of being poisonous with illness being reported from ingesting both plant parts and water contaminated by the flowers. In rare instances, workers clearing a heavily infested areas have experienced myocarditis, inflammation of the heart, due to exposure to ailanthus sap. However, in a controlled feeding experiment for over 100 days found the leaves are not poisonous to goats. The goats did avoid the bark of the tree, but extracts from the bark were fed to them without ill effect.

== Uses ==
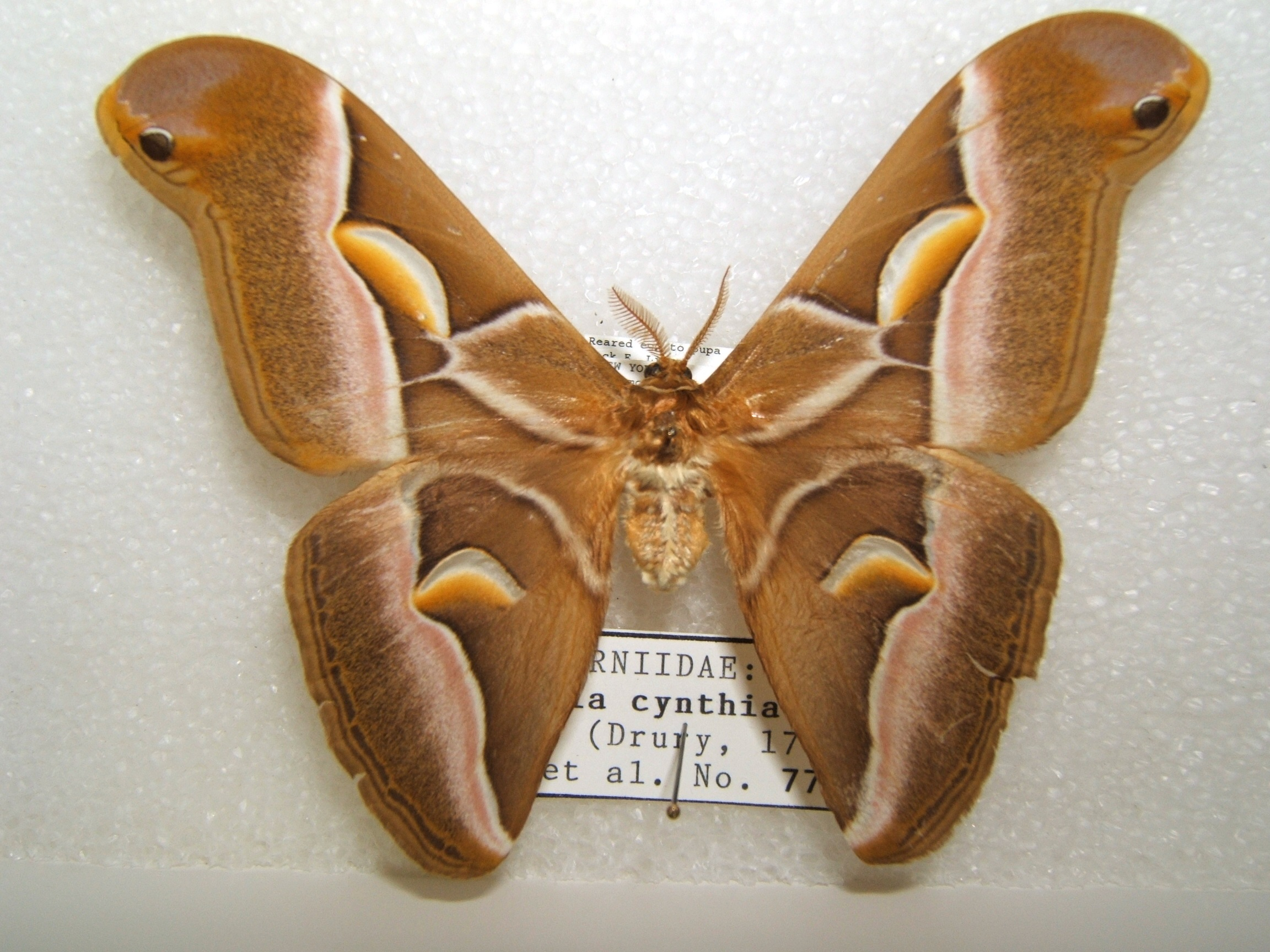
A male ailanthus silkmoth from the Texas A&M University insect collection

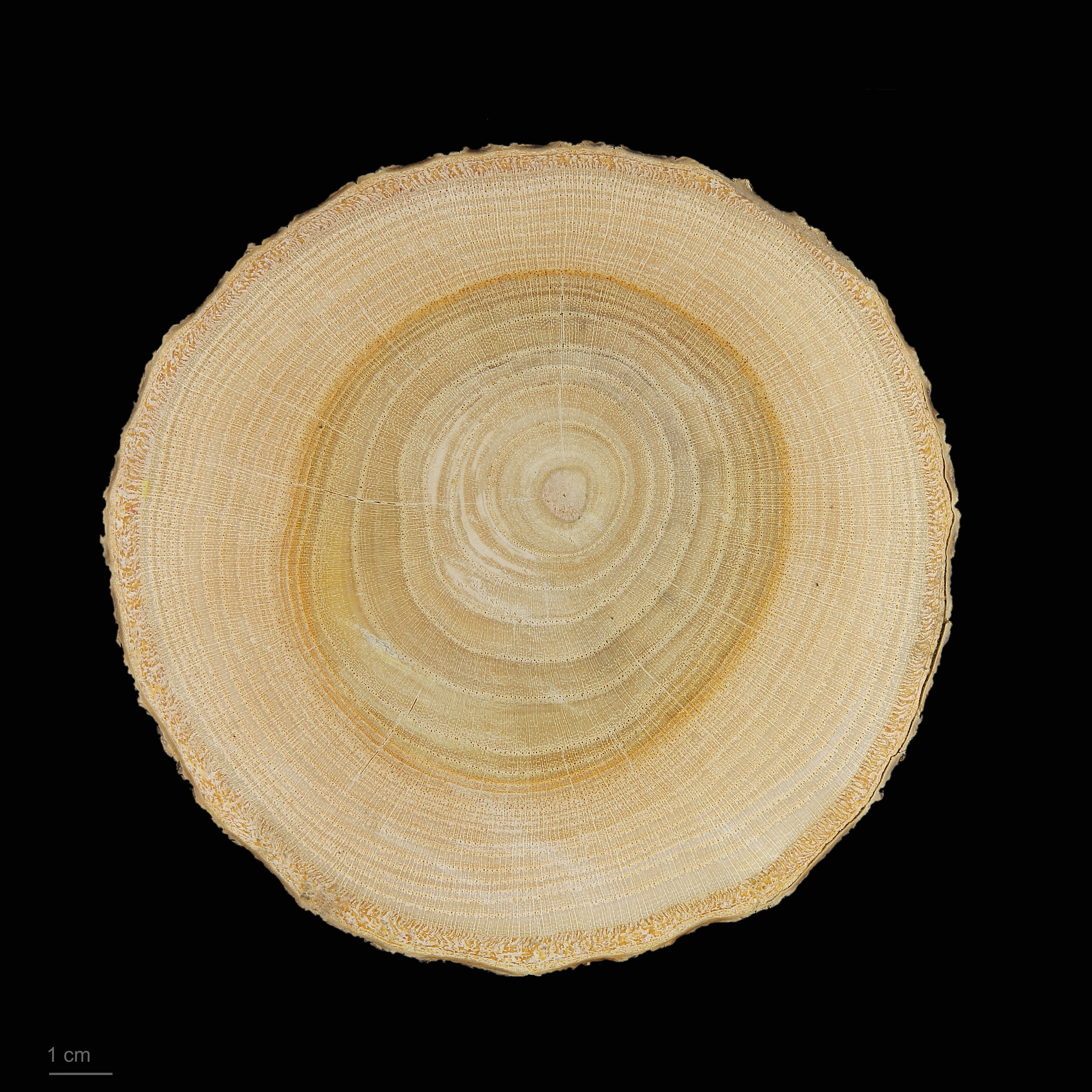
Ailanthus altissima - MHNT

In addition to its use as an ornamental plant, the tree of heaven is also used for its wood and as a host plant to feed silkworms of the moth Samia cynthia, which produces a coarse and hard-wearing silk unable to take dye. This type of silk is known under various names: "pongee", "eri silk", and "Shantung silk", the last name being derived from Shandong in China where this silk is often produced. Its production is particularly well known in the Yantai region of that province. The moth has also been introduced in the United States.

The pale yellow, close-grained, and satiny wood of ailanthus trees was used in cabinet work. It is flexible and well-suited to the manufacture of kitchen steamers, which are important in Chinese cuisine for cooking mantou, pastries, and rice. Zhejiang in eastern China is most famous for producing these steamers. The plant is also considered a good source of firewood across much of its range, as it is moderately hard and heavy, yet readily available. The wood is also used to make charcoal for culinary purposes. However, there are problems with using the wood as lumber; because the trees exhibit rapid growth for the first few years, the trunk has uneven texture between the inner and outer wood, which can cause the wood to twist or crack during drying. Techniques have been developed for drying the wood so as to prevent this cracking, allowing it to be commercially harvested. Although the live tree tends to have very flexible wood, the wood is quite hard once properly dried.

=== Cultivation ===
Tree of heaven is a popular ornamental tree in China and valued for its tolerance of difficult growing conditions. It was once very popular in cultivation in both Europe and North America, but this popularity dropped, especially in the United States, due to the disagreeable odor of its blossoms and the weediness of its habit. The problem of odor was previously avoided by only selling pistillate plants since only males produce the smell, but a higher seed production also results. Michael Dirr, a noted American horticulturalist and professor at the University of Georgia, reported meeting, in 1982, a grower who could not find any buyers. He further writes (his emphasis):

For most landscaping conditions, it has no value as there are too many trees of superior quality; for impossible conditions this tree has a place; selection could be made for good habit, strong wood and better foliage which would make the tree more satisfactory; I once talked with an architect who tried to buy Ailanthus for use along polluted highways but could not find an adequate supply [...]

— Michael A. Dirr, Manual of Woody Landscape Plants

In Europe, however, the tree is still used in the garden to some degree as its habit is generally not as invasive as it is in America. In the United Kingdom it is especially common in London squares, streets, and parks, though it is also frequently found in gardens of southern England and East Anglia. It becomes rare in the north, occurring only infrequently in southern Scotland. It is also rare in Ireland. In Germany the tree is commonly planted in gardens. In addition to being short-lived and the trunks over 60 to 90 centimeters (2 to 3 ft) often become hollow with no outward signs before they are destroyed in high winds.

Notable cultivars include:

- Hongye – The name is Chinese and means "red leaves". As the name implies it has attractive vivid red foliage
- Thousand Leaders
- Metro – A male cultivar with a tighter crown than usual and a less weedy habit
- Erythrocarpa – The fruits are a striking red
- Pendulifolia – Leaves are much longer and hang elegantly

=== Traditional medicine ===
Nearly every part of A. altissima has had various uses in Chinese traditional medicine. A tincture of the root bark was thought useful by American herbalists in the 19th century. However, the tinctures were also known at the time to cause nausea, vomiting, and muscle weakness. The tree's noxious odours have been associated with nausea and headaches, and with contact dermatitis reported in both humans and sheep, which developed weakness and paralysis. The ailanthus tree contains various phytochemicals including quassin, saponin and ailanthone, as well as the quinone irritant, 2,6-dimethoxybenzoquinone.

== Culture ==
=== China ===
In addition to the tree of heaven's various uses, it has also been a part of Chinese culture for many centuries and has more recently attained a similar status in the west. Within the oldest extant Chinese dictionary, the Erya, written in the 3rd century BCE, the tree of heaven is mentioned second among a list of trees. It was mentioned again in a materia medica compiled during the Tang dynasty in 656 CE. Each work favoured a different character, however, and there is still some debate in the Chinese botanical community as to which character should be used. The current name, chouchun (Chinese: 臭椿; pinyin: chòuchūn), means "stinking tree", and is a relatively new appellation. People living near the lower Yellow River know it by the name chunshu (simplified Chinese: 椿树; traditional Chinese: 椿樹; pinyin: chūnshù), meaning "spring tree". The name stems from the fact that ailanthus trees are some of the last trees to come out of dormancy, and as such its leaves coming out would indicate that winter was truly over.

In Chinese literature, Ailanthus is often used for two rather extreme metaphors, with a mature tree representing a father and a stump being a spoiled child. This manifests itself occasionally when expressing best wishes to a friend's father and mother in a letter, where one can write "wishing your Ailanthus and daylily are strong and happy", with ailanthus metaphorically referring to the father and daylily to the mother. Furthermore, one can scold a child by calling him a "good-for-nothing Ailanthus stump sprout", meaning the child is irresponsible. This derives from the literature of Zhuangzi, a Taoist philosopher, who referred to a tree that had developed from a sprout at the stump and was thus unsuitable for carpentry due to its irregular shape. Later scholars associated this tree with Ailanthus and applied the metaphor to children who, like stump sprouts of the tree, will not develop into a worthwhile human being if they don't follow rules or traditions.

=== United States ===
As early as 1886, the City of Atlanta, Georgia adopted an ordinance against the Ailanthus tree. The first Ordinance listed in The Code of the City of Atlanta Part II - Ordinance is titled Chapter 1, Ailanthus Tree Section 252, "Requires removal of Ailanthus tree". In it, the tree is declared a public nuisance and allows for a fine of $50 for any person owning or occupying any lot with the Tree of Heaven. It also authorizes the Street Committee to destroy all such trees growing on City property.

In William Faulkner's 1931 novel, Sanctuary, a "heaven-tree" stands outside the Jefferson jail, where Lee Goodwin and a "negro murderer" are incarcerated. The tree is associated with the black prisoner's despair in the face of his impending execution and the spirituals that he sings in chorus with other black people who keep a sort of vigil in the street below:

...they sang spirituals while white people slowed and stopped in the leafed darkness that was almost summer, to listen to those who were sure to die and him who was already dead singing about heaven and being tired; or perhaps in the interval between songs a rich, sourceless voice coming out of the high darkness where the ragged shadow of the heaven-tree which snooded the street lamp at the corner fretted and mourned: "Fo days mo! Den dey ghy stroy de bes ba'yton singer in nawth Mississippi!" Upon the barred and slitted wall the splotched shadow of the heaven-tree shuddered and pulsed monstrously in scarce any wind; rich and sad, the singing fell behind.

The 1943 novel A Tree Grows in Brooklyn by Betty Smith uses the tree of heaven as its central metaphor, using it as an analogy for the ability to thrive in a difficult environment. Then and since, Ailanthus has thrived in neglected urban areas. She writes:

There's a tree that grows in Brooklyn. Some people call it the Tree of Heaven. No matter where its seed falls, it makes a tree which struggles to reach the sky. It grows in boarded up lots and out of neglected rubbish heaps. It grows up out of cellar gratings. It is the only tree that grows out of cement. It grows lushly... survives without sun, water, and seemingly earth. It would be considered beautiful except that there are too many of it.

— A Tree Grows in Brooklyn, Introduction

In the 2013 book Teardown: Memoir of a Vanishing City by Gordon Young, the tree is referenced in a description of the Carriage Town neighborhood in Flint, Michigan.

Festive Victorian-era homes in various stages of restoration battled for supremacy with boarded-up firetraps and overgrown lots landscaped with weeds, garbage, and "ghetto palms," a particularly hardy invasive species known more formally as Ailanthus altissima, or the tree of heaven, perhaps because only God can kill the things. Around the corner, business was brisk at a drug house where residents and customers alike weren't above casually taking a piss in the driveway.

Until 26 March 2008, a 60-foot-tall (18 m) member of the species was a prominent "centerpiece" of the sculpture garden at the Noguchi Museum in the Astoria section in the borough of Queens in New York City. The tree had been spared by the sculptor Isamu Noguchi in 1975 when he bought the building which would become the museum and cleaned up its back lot. The tree was the only one he left in the yard, and the staff would eat lunch with Noguchi under it. "[I]n a sense, the sculpture garden was designed around the tree", said a former aide to Noguchi, Bonnie Rychlak, who later became the museum curator. By 2008, the old tree was found to be dying and in danger of crashing into the building, which was about to undergo a major renovation. The museum hired the Detroit Tree of Heaven Woodshop, an artists' collective, to use the wood to create benches, sculptures and other amenities in and around the building. The tree's rings were counted, revealing its age to be 75, and museum officials hoped it would regenerate from a sucker.

=== Europe ===
Ingo Vetter, a German artist and professor of fine arts at Umeå University in Sweden, was influenced by the idea of the "ghetto palm" and installed a living Ailanthus tree taken from Detroit for an international art show called Shrinking Cities at the Kunst-Werke Institute for Contemporary Art in Berlin in 2004.

== Sources ==
=== Books ===
- Burrows, George Edward; Tyrl, Ronald J. (2012). Toxic Plants of North America (2nd ed.). Hoboken, New Jersey: Wiley-Blackwell. doi:10.1002/9781118413425.ch77. ISBN 978-1-1184-1342-5. OCLC 815970198.
- Dame, Lorin Low; Brooks, Henry (1901). Handbook of the Trees of New England: With Ranges Throughout the United States and Canada (First ed.). Boston, Massachusetts: Ginn & Company, Publishers. OCLC 1484602859.
- Dirr, Michael (1998) [1975]. Manual of Woody Landscape Plants: Their Identification, Ornamental Characteristics, Culture, Propagation and Uses (Fifth ed.). Champaign, Illinois: Stipes Publishing L.L.C. ISBN 978-0-87563-800-3. OCLC 39852725.
- Faulkner, William (1932). Sanctuary. New York: The Modern library (Random House). OCLC 557539727.
- Fitter, Alastair (1999) [1980]. Collins Gem Trees. Illustrated by David More. Glasgow, Scotland: HarperCollins Publishers. ISBN 978-0-00-472268-9. OCLC 41582617.
- Foster, Steven; Duke, James A. (2000). A Field Guide to Medicinal Plants and Herbs of Eastern and Central North America. Peterson field guide series (Second ed.). Boston, Massachusetts: Houghton Mifflin Co. ISBN 978-0-395-98815-2. OCLC 41387633.
- Felter, Harvey Wickes; Lloyd, John Uri; King, John (1905). King's American Dispensatory. Vol. 1 (18th, 3rd Revision ed.). Cincinnati, Ohio: Ohio Valley Company. OCLC 3799356.
- Harrison, Lorraine (2012). RHS Latin for Gardeners: Over 3000 Plant Names Explained and Explored (First ed.). London: Mitchell Beazley. ISBN 978-1-84533-731-5. OCLC 797981038.
- Johnson, Hugh (2010) [1973]. The World of Trees (Completely Revised ed.). Berkeley, California: University of California Press. ISBN 978-0-520-24756-7. OCLC 606760496.
- Keeler, Harriet L. (1900). Our Native Trees and How to Identify Them; A Popular Study of Their Habits and Their Peculiarities (First ed.). New York: Charles Scribner's Sons. OCLC 780266159.
- Kowarik, Ingo (2003). Biologische Invasionen – Neophyten und Neozoen in Mitteleuropa [Biological invasions - Neophytes and Neozoa in Central Europe] (in German). Stuttgart, Germany: Verlag Eugen Ulmer. ISBN 978-3-8001-3924-8. OCLC 704051798.
- Lee, David; West, Stacy (2011). Wayside Trees of Tropical Florida: A Guide to the Native and Exotic Trees and Palms of Miami and Tropical South Florida (First ed.). Mebane, North Carolina: Tellus Books. ISBN 978-0-9822715-4-4. OCLC 778385448.
- Li, Hui-lin (1993). "Simaroubaceae" 苦木科. In Editorial Committee of the Flora of Taiwan (ed.). Flora of Taiwan 臺灣植物誌. Vol. 3, Angiosperms, dicotyledons. [Hamamelidaceae - Umbelliferae] (Second ed.). Taipei: Editorial Committee of the Flora of Taiwan. ISBN 978-957-9019-41-5. OCLC 813854047. Archived from the original on 13 February 2007.
- Little, Elbert L. Jr. (1979). Checklist of United States Trees (Native and Naturalized). Agriculture Handbook (United States Department of Agriculture), no. 541. Washington, D.C.: United States Government Printing Office. OCLC 6553978.
- Little, Elbert L. Jr. (1980). The Audubon Society Field Guide to North American Trees, Eastern Region. New York: Alfred A. Knopf. ISBN 978-0-394-50760-6. OCLC 6467607.
- Loewer, H. Peter (2001). Solving Weed Problems. Guilford, Connenticut: Lyons Press. ISBN 978-1-58574-274-5. OCLC 47045051.
- Miller, James Howard (2006) [2003]. Nonnative Invasive Plants of Southern Forests: A Field Guide for Identification and Contro (PDF). General technical report SRS, 62 (Third Revised ed.). Asheville, North Carolina: United States Department of Agriculture, Forest Service, Southern Research Station. OCLC 253402686. Archived (PDF) from the original on 7 October 2024.
- Millspaugh, Charles Frederick (1887). American Medicinal Plants; An Illustrated and Descriptive Guide to the American Plants Used as Homoeopathic Remedies: Their History, Preparation, Chemistry and Physiological Effects. Vol. I. New York: Boericke & Tafel. OCLC 63630342.
- Mitchell, Alan F. (1974). A Field Guide to the Trees of Britain and Northern Europe (First American ed.). Boston, Massachusetts: Houghton Mifflin. ISBN 978-0-395-19114-9. OCLC 1115354.
- Munz, Philip A.; Keck, David D. (1973) [First edition 1959]. A California Flora: Supplement (Combined ed.). Berkeley, California: University of California Press. ISBN 978-0-520-02405-2. OCLC 3866128.
- Patrick, Darren (2015). "13. Queering the Urban Forest: Invasions, Mutualisms, and Eco-Political Creativity with the Tree of Heaven". In Sandberg, L. Anders; Bardekjian, Adrina; Butt, Sadia (eds.). Urban Forests, Trees, and Greenspace: A Political Ecology Perspective. London: Routledge, Taylor & Francis Group. ISBN 978-0-415-71410-5. OCLC 868199760.
- Prance, Ghillean T. (1998). Rainforests of the World: Water, Fire, Earth & Air (First ed.). New York: Crown. ISBN 978-0-609-60364-2. OCLC 36252866.
- Quattrocchi, Umberto (2012). CRC World Dictionary of Medicinal and Poisonous Plants: Common Names, Scientific Names, Eponyms, Synonyms, and Etymology. Boca Raton, Florida: CRC Press. ISBN 978-1-4822-5064-0. OCLC 874163087.
- Schmeil, Otto; Fitschen, Jost; Seybold, Siegmund (2006). Flora von Deutschland und angrenzender Länder: ein Buch zum Bestimmen der wild wachsenden und häufig kultivierten Gefäßpflanzen [Flora of Germany and Neighboring Countries: A Book for Identifying Wild and Commonly Cultivated Vascular Plants] (in German) (93., völlig überarb. u. erw. Aufl., [Jubiläumsausg.] ed.). Wiebelsheim, Germany: Quelle & Meyer. ISBN 978-3-494-01413-5. OCLC 163417000.
- Simeone, Vincent A. (2007). Great flowering Landscape Trees. Batavia, Illinois: Ball Publishing. ISBN 978-1-883052-53-9. OCLC 78063240.
- Woodward, Susan L.; Quinn, Joyce Ann (2011). Encyclopedia of Invasive Species: From Africanized Honey Bees to Zebra Mussels. Vol. 2: Plants. Santa Barbara, California: Greenwood. ISBN 978-0-313-38220-8. OCLC 755414408.
- Young, Gordon (2013). Teardown: Memoir of a Vanishing City. Berkeley, California: University of California Press. ISBN 978-0-520-27052-7. OCLC 842883490.
- Yow, Valerie Raleigh (2008). Betty Smith: Life of the Author of A tree Grows in Brooklyn. Chapel Hill, North Carolina: Wolf's Pond Press. ISBN 978-0-9702249-3-4. OCLC 183868154.
- Zheng, Hao; Wu, Yun; Ding, Jianqing; Binion, Denise; Fu, Weidong; Reardon, Richard (2006). Invasive Plants of Asian Origin Established in the United States and Their Natural Enemies (PDF). FHTET. Vol. 1 (Second ed.). Morgantown, West Virginia: United States Department of Agriculture, Forest Service, Forest Health Technology Enterprise Team. OCLC 173621745. Archived (PDF) from the original on 8 May 2024.

=== Journals ===
- Barringer, Lawrence; Ciafré, Claire M (17 October 2020). "Worldwide Feeding Host Plants of Spotted Lanternfly, With Significant Additions From North America". Environmental Entomology. 49 (5): 999–1011. doi:10.1093/ee/nvaa093. PMID 32797186.
- Bourke, Ca (December 1996). "Lack of toxicity of Ailanthus altissima (tree-of-heaven) for goats". Australian Veterinary Journal. 74 (6): 465. doi:10.1111/j.1751-0813.1996.tb07572.x. JSTOR 2473114.
- Corbett, Sarah L.; Manchester, Steven R. (2004). "Phytogeography and fossil history of Ailanthus (Simaroubaceae)". International Journal of Plant Sciences. 165 (4): 671–690. Bibcode:2004IJPlS.165..671C. doi:10.1086/386378. ISSN 1058-5893. S2CID 85383552.
- Grime, J. P. (9 October 1965). "Shade Tolerance in Flowering Plants". Nature. 208 (5006): 161–163. Bibcode:1965Natur.208..161G. doi:10.1038/208161a0. S2CID 43191167.
- Heisey, Rod M. (May 1990). "Allelopathic and Herbicidal Effects of Extracts from Tree of Heaven (Ailanthus altissima)". American Journal of Botany. 77 (5): 662–670. doi:10.2307/2444812. ISSN 0002-9122. JSTOR 2444812.
- Heisey, Rod M. (February 1996). "Identification of an Allelopathic Compound from Ailanthus altissima (Simaroubaceae) and Characterization of its Herbicidal Activity". American Journal of Botany. 83 (2): 192–200. doi:10.2307/2445938. ISSN 0002-9122. JSTOR 2445938.
- Hu, Shiu Ying (March 1979). "Ailanthus". Arnoldia. 39 (2): 29–50. doi:10.5962/p.250166. ISSN 0004-2633. JSTOR 42954660. Archived (PDF) from the original on 19 July 2011.
- Kaproth, Matthew A.; McGraw, James B. (1 October 2008). "Seed Viability and Dispersal of the Wind-Dispersed Invasive Ailanthus altissima in Aqueous Environments" (PDF). Forest Science. 54 (5): 490–496. doi:10.1093/forestscience/54.5.490. ISSN 0015-749X. Archived (PDF) from the original on 5 June 2024.
- Knapp, Liza B.; Canham, Charles D. (October 2000). "Invasion of an Old-Growth Forest in New York by Ailanthus altissima: Sapling Growth and Recruitment in Canopy Gaps". Journal of the Torrey Botanical Society. 127 (4): 307–315. doi:10.2307/3088649. ISSN 1095-5674. JSTOR 3088649.
- Lawrence, Jeffrey G.; Colwell, Alison; Sexton, Owen J. (July 1991). "The Ecological Impact of Allelopathy in Ailanthus altissima (Simaroubaceae)". American Journal of Botany. 78 (7): 948–958. doi:10.2307/2445173. ISSN 0002-9122. JSTOR 2445173.
- Mergen, Francois (September 1959). "A Toxic Principle in the Leaves of Ailanthus". Botanical Gazette. 121 (1): 32–36. doi:10.1086/336038. ISSN 0006-8071. JSTOR 2473114. S2CID 84989561.
- Merriam, Robert W. (October 2003). "The Abundance, Distribution and Edge Associations of Six Non-Indigenous, Harmful Plants across North Carolina". The Journal of the Torrey Botanical Society. 130 (4): 283–291. doi:10.2307/3557546. ISSN 1095-5674. JSTOR 3557546.
- Miles, Harrison H; Salom, Scott; Shively, Timothy J; Bielski, Jason T; McAvoy, Thomas J; Fearer, Carrie J (13 March 2025). "A review of potential biological controls for Ailanthus altissima". Annals of the Entomological Society of America. 118 (2): 101–109. doi:10.1093/aesa/saae041.
- Planchuelo, Greg; Catalán, Pablo; Delgado, Juan Antonio (May 2016). "Gone with the wind and the stream: Dispersal in the invasive species Ailanthus altissima" (PDF). Acta Oecologica. 73: 31–37. Bibcode:2016AcO....73...31P. doi:10.1016/j.actao.2016.02.006. hdl:10016/30463. ISSN 1873-6238. Archived from the original (PDF) on 13 November 2020.
- Shah, Behula (1997). "The Checkered Career of Ailanthus altissima". Arnoldia. 57 (3): 20–27. doi:10.5962/p.251182. ISSN 0004-2633. JSTOR 42954525.
- Sladonja, Barbara; Sušek, Marta; Guillermic, Julia (October 2015). "Review on Invasive Tree of Heaven (Ailanthus altissima (Mill.) Swingle) Conflicting Values: Assessment of Its Ecosystem Services and Potential Biological Threat". Environmental Management. 56 (4): 1009–1034. Bibcode:2015EnMan..56.1009S. doi:10.1007/s00267-015-0546-5. PMID 26071766.
- Stipes, R. Jay; Witt, H.L. (1995). "A Tree Grows in Virginia". Virginia Journal of Science. 46 (2): 105. Archived (PDF) from the original on 16 July 2011.
- Swingle, Walter T. (1916). "The early European history and the botanical name of the Tree of Heaven, Ailanthus altissima". Journal of the Washington Academy of Sciences. 6 (14): 490–498. ISSN 0043-0439. JSTOR 24521283.
- Wickert, Kristen L.; O'Neal, Eric S.; Davis, Donald D.; Kasson, Matthew T. (27 June 2017). "Seed Production, Viability, and Reproductive Limits of the Invasive Ailanthus altissima (Tree-of-Heaven) within Invaded Environments". Forests. 8 (7): 226–238. Bibcode:2017Fore....8..226W. doi:10.3390/f8070226.

=== News sources ===
- Barclay, Eliza (24 May 2013). "The Great Charcoal Debate: Briquettes or Lumps?". The Salt. NPR. Archived from the original on 15 June 2025.
- Collins, Glenn (27 March 2008). "A Tree That Survived a Sculptor's Chisel Is Chopped Down". The New York Times. Archived from the original on 27 November 2024.
- Collins, Lisa M. (10 December 2003). "Ghetto Palm". Detroit Metro Times. Archived from the original on 27 March 2025.
- Davies, Rob (16 September 2006). "The toxic Tree of Heaven threatens England's green and pleasant land". The Observer. The Guardian. Archived from the original on 2 October 2013.
- Wasacz, Walter (30 January 2007). "Big Ideas for Shrinking Cities". Model D. Archived from the original on 3 January 2010.

=== Papers and reports ===
- Kuhns, Mike; Rupp, Larry (July 2000). Selecting and Planting Landscape Trees (PDF) (Report) (Second ed.). Utah State University Cooperative Extension. NR-460. Archived (PDF) from the original on 26 September 2012.
- Zhang, Donglin; Dirr, Michael A. (2004). Potential New Ornamental Plants from China (PDF). 49th Annual Southern Nursery Association Research Conference. SNA Research Conference Proceedings. Vol. 49. pp. 607–609. Archived from the original (PDF) on 25 June 2010.

=== Web sources ===
- Barnes, Jeffrey K. (2 June 2005). "Ailanthus webworm moth". University of Arkansas Arthropod Museum. University of Arkansas. Archived from the original on 18 June 2010.
- CISS Staff (n.d.). "Tree-of-heaven, Chinese Sumac, Stinking Cedar, Copal Tree, Varnish Tree, Hemelboom, Stinking Cedar". Weeds Australia. Centre for Invasive Species Solutions. Archived from the original on 28 April 2025.
- CoCT Staff (15 February 2016). "City urges residents to report invasive tree of heaven". City of Cape Town. Archived from the original on 22 February 2016.
- Duke, James A. (19 December 1997) [Manuscript written 1983]. "Ailanthus altissima in Handbook of Energy Crops". New Crop Resource Online Program. Center for New Crops & Plant Products at Purdue University. Archived from the original on 2 June 2025.
- Farah, Troy (3 March 2021). "Tree of heaven is a hellish invasive species. Could a fungus save the day?". National Geographic. Archived from the original on 3 March 2021.
- Fryer, Janet L. (2010). "Ailanthus altissima". Fire Effects Information System. U.S. Department of Agriculture, Forest Service, Rocky Mountain Research Station, Fire Sciences Laboratory. Archived from the original on 22 June 2025.
- Gill, Barbara (2004). "Ailanthus". WoodSampler. Woodworker's Website Association. Archived from the original on 4 June 2024.
- Harrison, Tim; Crick, Julie; McCullough, Deborah (2 October 2023). "A Tale of Two Invaders: Tree of Heaven and Spotted Lanternfly". MSU Extension, Integrated Pest Management. Michigan State University. Archived from the original on 9 December 2024.
- Hassler, Michael (26 July 2025). "Ailanthus altissima in Synonymic Checklist and Distribution of the World Flora. Version 25.07". World Plants.
- Hoshovsky, Marc C. (30 November 1988). "Element Stewardship Abstract for Ailanthus altissima" (PDF). Center for Invasive Species and Ecosystem Health. Arlington, Virginia: The Nature Conservancy. Archived (PDF) from the original on 8 March 2022.
- Hua, Peng (彭华); Thomas, William Wayt (2008). Turland, Nicholas J. (ed.). "Ailanthus altissimus". Flora of China. eFloras. Archived from the original on 1 November 2024.
- Mansell, Patrick (10 August 2017). "Tree-of-heaven's prolific seed production adds to its invasive potential". PennState Research. Pennsylvania State University. Archived from the original on 17 March 2025.
- Miller, James H. (1990). "Ailanthus altissima". In Burns, Russell M.; Honkala, Barbara H. (eds.). Hardwoods. Silvics of North America. Vol. 2. Washington, D.C.: United States Forest Service (USFS), United States Department of Agriculture (USDA) – via Southern Research Station.
- Nava, S.C. (29 April 2014). "Ailanthus altissima (tree-of-heaven)" (Document). CABI. doi:10.1079/cabicompendium.3889.
- NZPCN Staff (17 September 2024). "Ailanthus altissima" (PDF). New Zealand Plant Conservation Network : Rōpū hononga Koiora Taiao ki Aoteoroa. Archived (PDF) from the original on 12 February 2025.
- Oldfield, S. (2024). "Ailanthus altissima". IUCN Red List of Threatened Species. 2024 e.T62993A67810745. doi:10.2305/IUCN.UK.2024-1.RLTS.T62993A67810745.en.
- Pan, F.J. (1998). "Ailanthus altissima var. tanakai". IUCN Red List of Threatened Species. 1998 e.T31349A9628316. doi:10.2305/IUCN.UK.1998.RLTS.T31349A9628316.en.
- OED. "Ailanthus, N.". Oxford English Dictionary (online ed.). Oxford University Press. doi:10.1093/OED/9251052611. (Subscription or participating institution membership required.)
- OED. "Tree of Heaven, N.". Oxford English Dictionary (online ed.). Oxford University Press. doi:10.1093/OED/5073073801. (Subscription or participating institution membership required.)
- POWO (2025). "Ailanthus altissima (Mill.) Swingle". Plants of the World Online. Royal Botanic Gardens, Kew.
- POWO (2025). "Ailanthus altissima var. altissima". Plants of the World Online. Royal Botanic Gardens, Kew.
- POWO (2025). "Ailanthus altissima var. sutchuenensis (Dode) Rehder & E.H.Wilson". Plants of the World Online. Royal Botanic Gardens, Kew.
- POWO (2025). "Ailanthus altissima var. tanakae (Hayata) Kaneh. & Sasaki". Plants of the World Online. Royal Botanic Gardens, Kew.
- Preston, Robert E.; McClintock, Elizabeth (2012). "Ailanthus altissima, in Jepson Flora Project". Jepson eFlora. University of California, Berkeley. Archived from the original on 4 June 2024.
- Roy, Pamela; Frentzel, Kristen; Charkes, Susan (13 June 2018). "Invasive Species Spotlight: Tree-of-Heaven (Ailanthus altissima) and Spotted Lanternfly (Lycorma delicatula)". Conservancy Blog. Chadds Ford, Pennsylvania: Brandywine Conservancy & Museum of Art. Archived from the original on 7 September 2024.
- Swearingen, Jil M.; Pannill, Phil (20 May 2005). "Fact Sheet: Tree of heaven" (PDF). National Park Service. Plant Conservation Alliance's Alien Plant Working Group. Archived from the original (PDF) on 28 September 2006.
- Wallace, Victoria; Siegel-Miles, Alyssa; Sowizral, Klaudia (January 2022). "Invasive Plant Factsheet: Tree-of-heaven". Integrated Pest Management. University of Connecticut. Archived from the original on 4 August 2024.
- WFO. "Ailanthus Desf". World Flora Online.
