= Gordon Young =

Gordon Young may refer to:

- Gordon Young (artist), British artist
- Gordon Young (composer) (1919–1998), American organist and composer
- Gordon Young (football manager), Scottish football manager
- Gordon Young (journalist), American journalist, author and educator
- Gordon Young (writer) (1886–1948), American writer of adventure and western stories
- Gordon Young, past chair of the Australian Civic Trust
- Gordon Elmo Young (1907–1969), United States federal judge
- Gordon Young (rugby union), Irish international rugby union player
