= C20H24O7 =

The molecular formula C_{20}H_{24}O_{7} (molar mass: 376.40 g/mol, exact mass: 376.1522 u) may refer to:

- Ailanthone
- Tripdiolide
- Triptolidenol
