= Japanese encephalitis =

Infection of the brain caused by the Japanese encephalitis virus

- Other names: Japanese B encephalitis
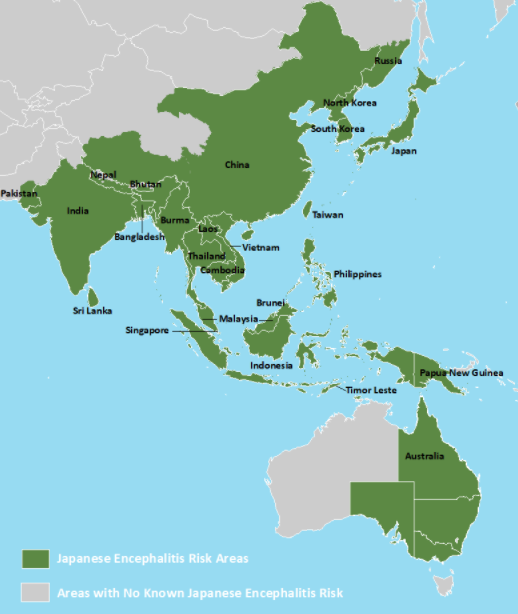
- The geographic distribution of Japanese encephalitis (dark green)
- Specialty: Infectious disease
- Symptoms: Headache, fever, vomiting, confusion, seizures
- Usual onset: 5 to 15 days after infection
- Causes: Japanese encephalitis virus (spread by mosquitoes)
- Diagnostic method: Blood or cerebrospinal fluid testing
- Prevention: Japanese encephalitis vaccine, avoiding mosquito bites
- Treatment: Supportive care
- Prognosis: Permanent neurological problems occur in up to half of survivors
- Frequency: 68,000
- Deaths: 17,000

Japanese encephalitis (JE) is an infection of the brain caused by the Japanese encephalitis virus (JEV). While most infections result in little or no symptoms, occasional inflammation of the brain occurs. In these cases, symptoms may include headache, vomiting, fever, confusion and seizures. This occurs about 5 to 15 days after infection.

JEV is generally spread by mosquitoes, specifically those of the Culex type. Pigs and wild birds serve as a reservoir for the virus. The disease occurs mostly outside of cities. Diagnosis is based on blood or cerebrospinal fluid testing.

Prevention is generally achieved with the Japanese encephalitis vaccine, which is both safe and effective. Other measures include avoiding mosquito bites. Once infected, there is no specific treatment, with care being supportive. This is generally carried out in a hospital. Permanent problems occur in up to half of people who recover from JE.

The disease primarily occurs in East and Southeast Asia as well as the Western Pacific. About 3 billion people live in areas where the disease occurs. About 68,000 symptomatic cases occur a year, with about 17,000 deaths. Often, cases occur in outbreaks. The disease was first described in Japan in 1871.

== Signs and symptoms ==
The Japanese encephalitis virus (JEV) has an incubation period of 2 to 26 days. The vast majority of infections are asymptomatic. Only 1 in 250 infections develop into encephalitis.

Severe rigors may mark the onset of this disease in humans. Fever, headache, and malaise are other non-specific symptoms of this disease which may last for a period of between 1 and 6 days. Signs that develop during the acute encephalitic stage include neck rigidity, cachexia, hemiparesis, convulsions, and a raised body temperature between 38–43 °C (100.4–109.4 °F). The mortality rate of the disease is around 25% and is generally higher in children under five, the immuno-suppressed, and the elderly. Transplacental spread has been noted. Neurological disorders develop in 40% of those who survive with lifelong neurological defects such as deafness, emotional lability and hemiparesis occurring in those who had central nervous system involvement.

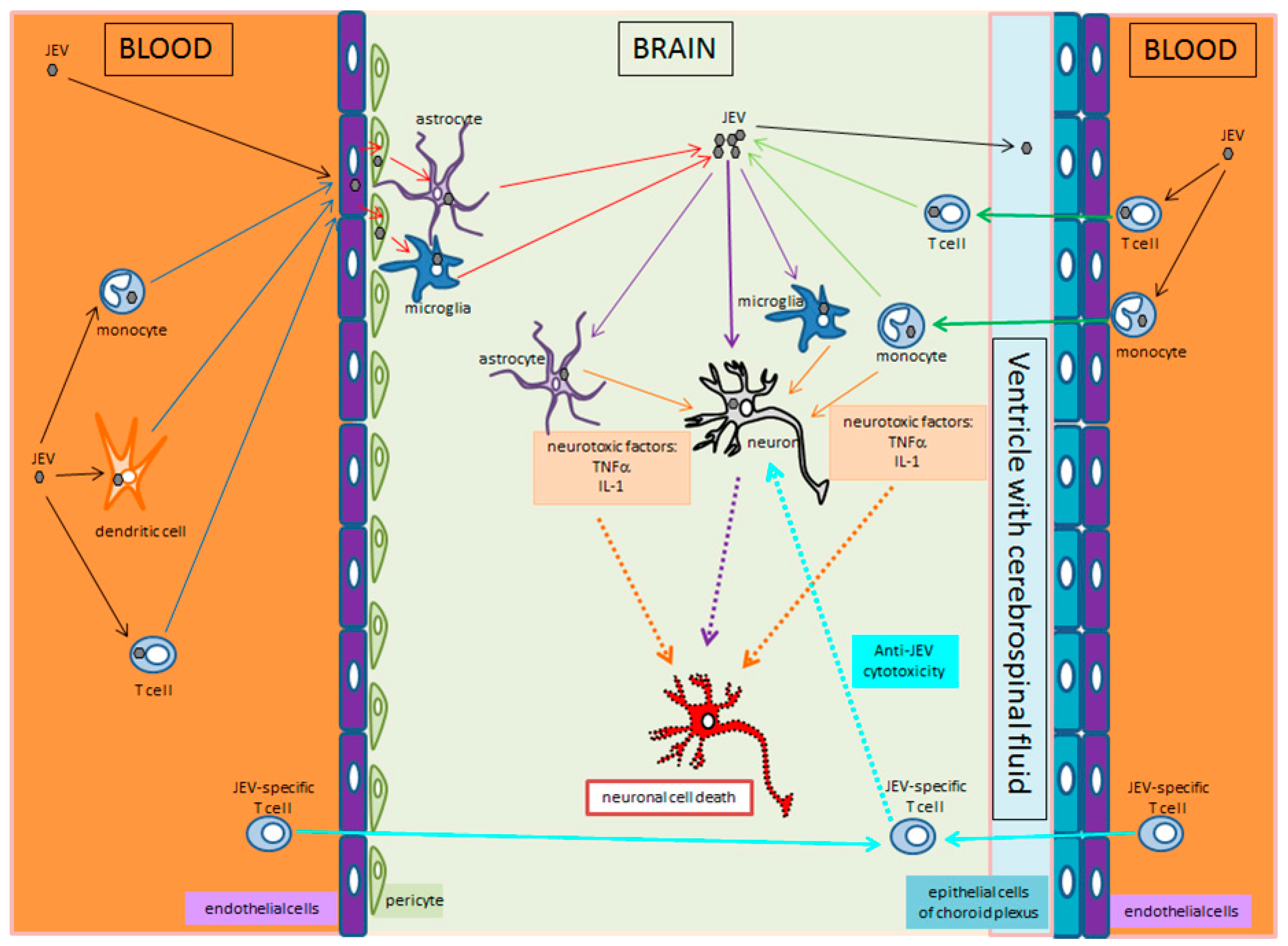
Japanese encephalitis virus enters the brain through two ways and leads to infection of neurons and encephalitis.

Increased microglial activation following Japanese encephalitis infection has been found to influence the outcome of viral pathogenesis. Microglia are the resident immune cells of the central nervous system (CNS) and have a critical role in host defense against invading microorganisms. Activated microglia secrete cytokines, such as interleukin-1 (IL-1) and tumor necrosis factor-alpha (TNF-α), which can cause toxic effects in the brain. Additionally, other soluble factors such as neurotoxins, excitatory neurotransmitters, prostaglandin, reactive oxygen, and nitrogen species are secreted by activated microglia.

In a murine model of JE, it was found that in the hippocampus and the striatum, the number of activated microglia was more than anywhere else in the brain, closely followed by that in the thalamus. In the cortex, the number of activated microglia was significantly less when compared to other regions of the mouse brain. An overall induction of differential expression of proinflammatory cytokines and chemokines from different brain regions during a progressive Japanese encephalitis infection was also observed.

Although the net effect of the proinflammatory mediators is to kill infectious organisms and infected cells as well as to stimulate the production of molecules that amplify the mounting response to damage, it is also evident that in a non-regenerating organ such as the brain, a dysregulated innate immune response would be deleterious. In JE the tight regulation of microglial activation appears to be disturbed, resulting in an autotoxic loop of microglial activation that possibly leads to bystander neuronal damage. In animals, key signs include infertility and abortion in pigs, neurological disease in horses, and systemic signs including fever, lethargy and anorexia.

== Cause ==
It is a disease caused by the mosquito-borne Japanese encephalitis virus (JEV).

=== Virology ===
Japanese encephalitis virus
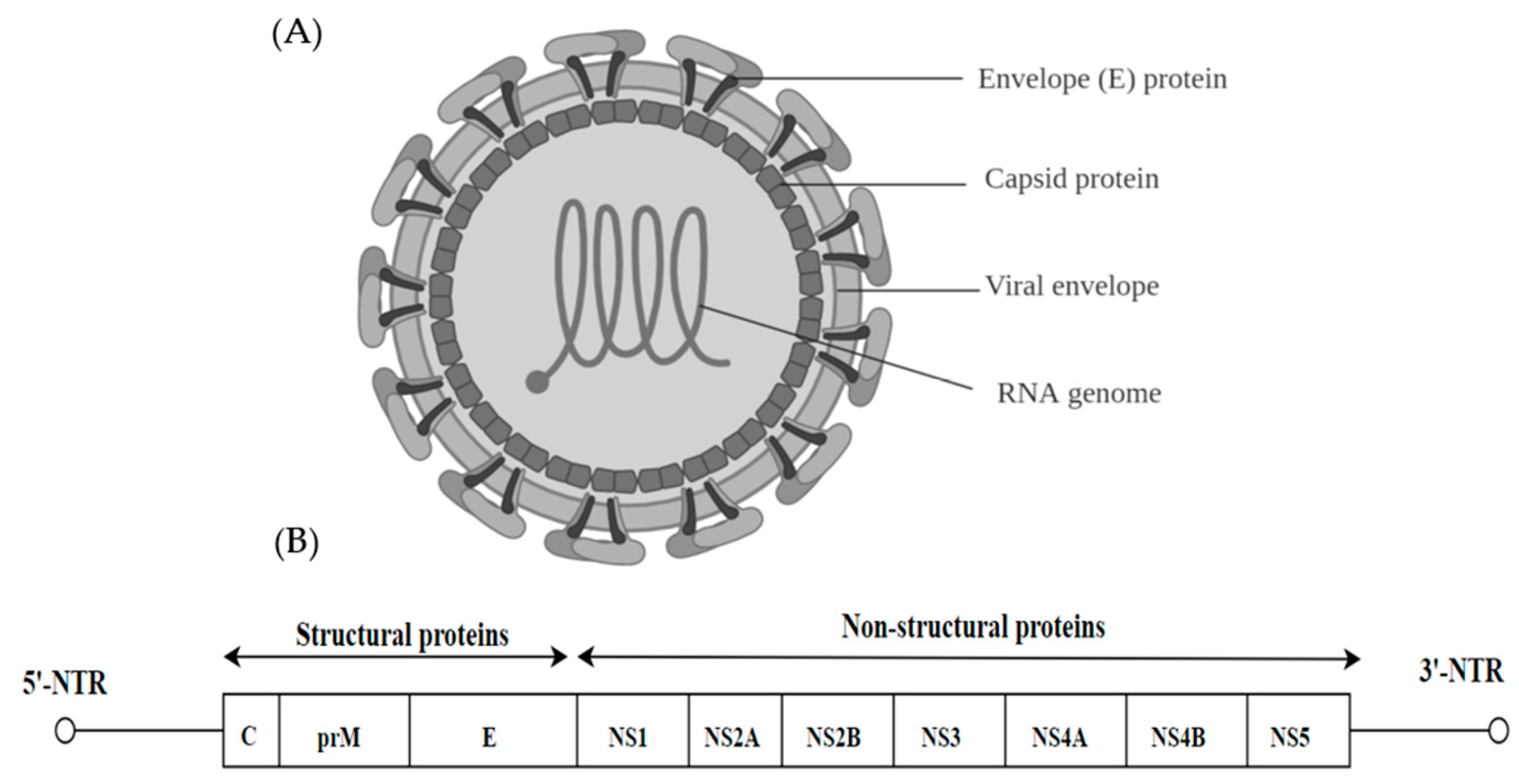
- Flavivirus structure and genome

Virus classification
- (unranked): Virus
- Realm: Riboviria
- Kingdom: Orthornavirae
- Phylum: Kitrinoviricota
- Class: Flasuviricetes
- Order: Amarillovirales
- Family: Flaviviridae
- Genus: Orthoflavivirus
- Subgenus: Euflavivirus
- Species: Orthoflavivirus japonicum

JEV is a virus from the family Flaviviridae, part of the Japanese encephalitis serocomplex of nine genetically and antigenically related viruses, some of which are particularly severe in horses, and four of which, including West Nile virus, are known to infect humans. The enveloped virus is closely related to the West Nile virus and the St. Louis encephalitis virus. The positive sense single-stranded RNA genome is packaged in the capsid which is formed by the capsid protein. The outer envelope is formed by envelope protein and is the protective antigen. It aids in the entry of the virus into the cell. The genome also encodes several nonstructural proteins (NS1, NS2a, NS2b, NS3, N4a, NS4b, NS5). NS1 is also produced as a secretory form. NS3 is a putative helicase, and NS5 is the viral polymerase. It has been noted that Japanese encephalitis infects the lumen of the endoplasmic reticulum (ER) and rapidly accumulates substantial amounts of viral proteins.

Based on the envelope gene, there are five genotypes (I–V). The Muar strain, isolated from a patient in Malaya in 1952, is the prototype strain of genotype V. Genotype V is the earliest recognized ancestral strain. The first clinical reports date from 1870, but the virus appears to have evolved in the mid-16th century. Complete genomes of 372 strains of this virus have been sequenced as of 2024.

== Diagnosis ==
Japanese encephalitis is diagnosed by commercially available tests detecting JE virus-specific IgM antibodies in serum and/or cerebrospinal fluid, for example by IgM capture ELISA.

JE virus IgM antibodies are usually detectable 3 to 8 days after onset of illness and persist for 30 to 90 days, but longer persistence has been documented. Therefore, positive IgM antibodies occasionally may reflect a past infection or vaccination. Serum collected within 10 days of illness onset may not have detectable IgM, and the test should be repeated on a convalescent sample. Patients with JE virus IgM antibodies should have confirmatory neutralizing antibody testing. Confirmatory testing in the US is available only at the CDC and a few specialized reference laboratories. In fatal cases, nucleic acid amplification and virus culture of autopsy tissues can be useful. Viral antigens can be shown in tissues by indirect fluorescent antibody staining.

== Prevention ==
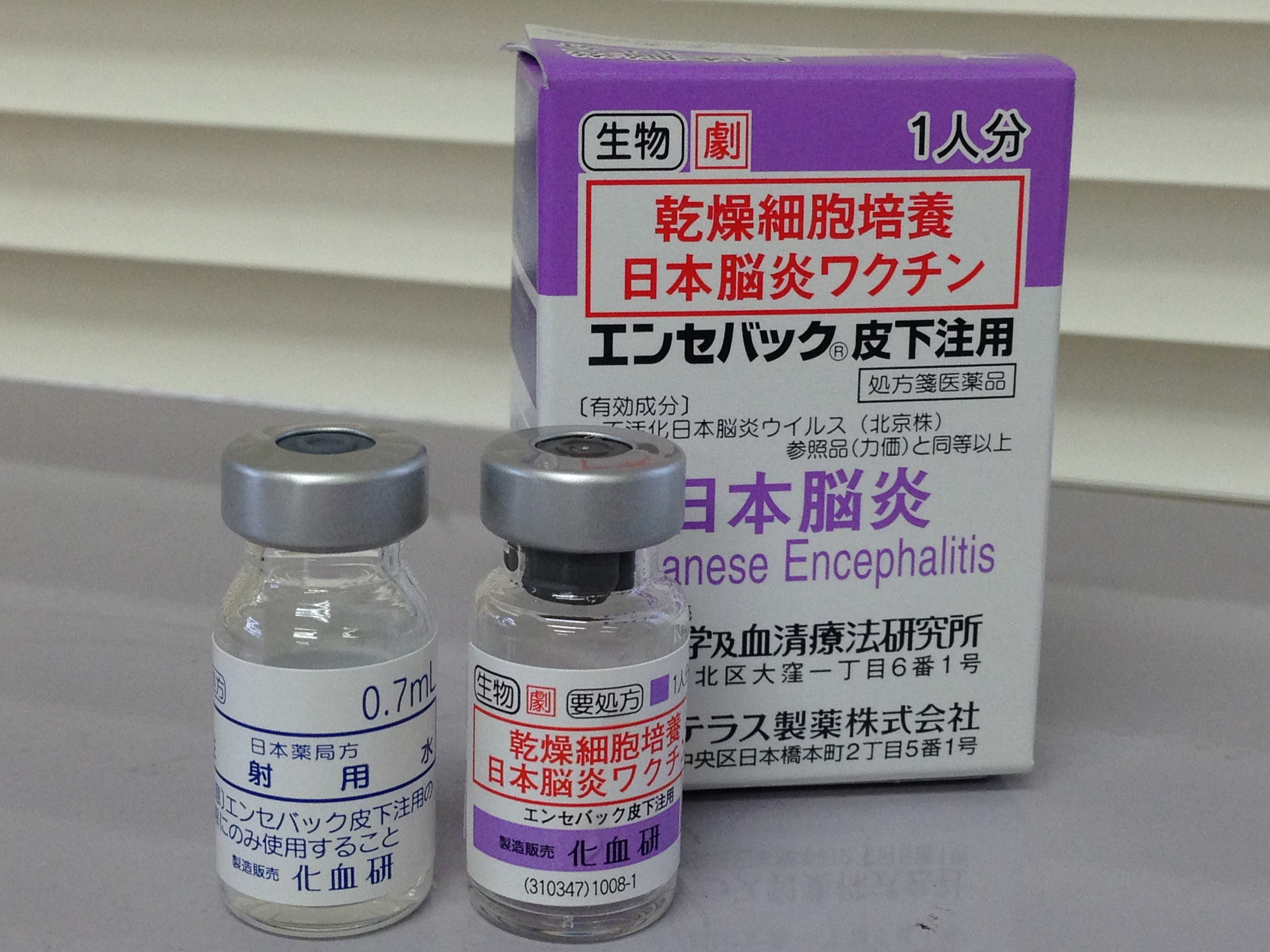
Japanese encephalitis vaccine "ENCEVAC" in the Japanese language

Infection with Japanese encephalitis confers lifelong immunity. There are currently three vaccines available: SA14-14-2, IXIARO (IC51, also marketed in Australia, New Zealand as JESPECT and India as JEEV) and ChimeriVax-JE (marketed as IMOJEV). All current vaccines are based on the genotype III virus.

A formalin-inactivated mouse-brain-derived vaccine was first produced in Japan in the 1930s and validated for use in Taiwan in the 1960s and Thailand in the 1980s. The widespread use of vaccines and urbanization has led to control of the disease in Japan and Singapore. The high cost of this vaccine, which is grown in live mice, means that poorer countries could not afford to give it as part of a routine immunization program.

The most common adverse effects are redness and pain at the injection site. Uncommonly, an urticarial reaction can develop about four days after injection. Vaccines produced from mouse brain have a risk of autoimmune neurological complications of around 1 per million vaccinations. However where the vaccine is not produced in mouse brains but in vitro using cell culture there are few adverse effects compared to placebo, the main side effects being headache and myalgia.

The neutralizing antibody persists in the circulation for at least two to three years, and perhaps longer. The total duration of protection is unknown, but because there is no firm evidence for protection beyond three years, boosters are recommended every 11 months for people who remain at risk. Some data are available regarding the interchangeability of other JE vaccines and IXIARO.

== Treatment ==
There is no specific treatment for Japanese encephalitis and treatment is supportive, with assistance given for feeding, breathing or seizure control as required. Raised intracranial pressure may be managed with mannitol. There is no transmission from person to person and therefore patients do not need to be isolated.

A breakthrough in the field of Japanese encephalitis therapeutics is the identification of macrophage receptor involvement in the disease severity. A recent report of an Indian group demonstrates the involvement of monocyte and macrophage receptor CLEC5A in severe inflammatory response in Japanese encephalitis infection of the brain. This transcriptomic study provides a hypothesis of neuroinflammation and a new lead in development of appropriate therapies for Japanese encephalitis.

The effectiveness of intravenous immunoglobulin for Japanese encephalitis is unclear due to a paucity of evidence. Intravenous immunoglobulin for Japanese encephalitis appeared to have no benefit.

== Epidemiology ==
Disability-adjusted life year for Japanese encephalitis per 100,000 inhabitants in 2002 no data less than 1 1–5 5–10 10–15 15–20 20–25 25–30 30–35 35–40 40–45 45–50 more than 50

Japanese encephalitis (JE) is the leading cause of viral encephalitis in Asia, with up to 70,000 cases reported annually. Of those with symptoms case-fatality rates range from 20% to 30%. Rare outbreaks in U.S. territories in the Western Pacific have also occurred. Residents of rural areas in endemic locations are at highest risk; Japanese encephalitis does not usually occur in urban areas.

Countries that have had major epidemics in the past, but which have controlled the disease primarily by vaccination, include China, South Korea, Singapore, Japan, Taiwan and Thailand. Other countries that still have periodic epidemics include Vietnam, Cambodia, Myanmar, India, Nepal, and Malaysia. Japanese encephalitis has been reported in the Torres Strait Islands, and two fatal cases were reported in mainland northern Australia in 1998. There were reported cases in Kachin State, Myanmar in 2013. There were 116 deaths reported in Odisha's Malkangiri district of India in 2016.

In 2022, the notable increase in the distribution of the virus in Australia due to climate change became a concern to health officials as the population has limited immunity to the disease and the presence of large numbers of farmed and feral pigs could act as reservoirs for the virus. In February 2022, Japanese encephalitis was detected and confirmed in piggeries in Victoria, Queensland and New South Wales. On 4 March, cases were detected in South Australia. By October 2022, the outbreak in eastern mainland Australia had caused 42 symptomatic human cases of the disease, resulting in seven deaths. In 2025, further cases and a fatality were recorded in south-eastern Australia.

Humans, cattle, and horses are dead-end hosts as the disease manifests as fatal encephalitis. Pigs act as amplifying hosts and have a vital role in the epidemiology of the disease. Infection in swine is asymptomatic, except in pregnant sows when abortion and fetal abnormalities are common sequelae. The most important vector is Culex tritaeniorhynchus, which feeds on cattle in preference to humans. The natural hosts of the Japanese encephalitis virus are birds, not humans, and many believe the virus will never be eliminated. In November 2011, the Japanese encephalitis virus was reported in Culex bitaeniorhynchus in South Korea.

Recently, whole genome microarray research of neurons infected with the Japanese encephalitis virus has shown that neurons play an important role in their own defense against Japanese encephalitis infection. Although this challenges the long-held belief that neurons are immunologically quiescent, an improved understanding of the proinflammatory effects responsible for immune-mediated control of viral infection and neuronal injury during Japanese encephalitis infection is an essential step for developing strategies for limiting the severity of CNS disease.

A number of drugs have been investigated to either reduce viral replication or provide neuroprotection in cell lines or studies in mice. None are currently advocated in treating human patients.

- The use of rosmarinic acid, arctigenin, and oligosaccharides with degree of polymerization 6 from Gracilaria sp. or Monostroma nitidum is effective in a mouse model of Japanese encephalitis.
- Curcumin has been shown to impart neuroprotection against Japanese encephalitis infection in an in vitro study. Curcumin possibly acts by decreasing cellular reactive oxygen species levels, restoration of cellular membrane integrity, decreasing pro-apoptotic signaling molecules, and modulating cellular levels of stress-related proteins. It has also been shown that the production of infective viral particles from previously infected neuroblastoma cells is reduced, which is achieved by inhibition of the ubiquitin-proteasome system.
- Minocycline in mice resulted in marked decreases in the levels of several markers, viral titer, and the level of proinflammatory mediators and also prevented blood–brain barrier damage.

== Evolution ==
It is theorized that the virus may have originated from an ancestral virus in the mid-1500s in the Malay Archipelago region and evolved there into five different genotypes that spread across Asia. The mean evolutionary rate has been estimated to be 4.35×10^{−4} (range: 3.49×10^{−4} to 5.30×10^{−4}) nucleotide substitutions per site per year.

== Outbreak history ==
The clinical recognition and recording of Japanese encephalitis (JE) trace back to the 19th century when recurring encephalitis outbreaks were noted during Japan's summer months. The first clinical case of JE was documented in 1871 in Japan. However, it wasn't until 1924, during a major outbreak involving over 6,000 cases, that JE's severity and potential for widespread impact became apparent. Subsequent outbreaks in Japan were recorded in 1927, 1934, and 1935, each contributing to a deeper understanding of the disease and its transmission patterns. The spread of JE extended beyond Japan over the following decades, impacting numerous countries across Asia. On the Korean Peninsula, the first JE cases were reported in 1933, and mainland China documented its initial cases in 1940. The virus reached the Philippines in the early 1950s and continued its westward spread, with Pakistan recording cases in 1983, marking JE's furthest westward extension. By 1995, JE cases had reached Papua New Guinea and northern Australia (specifically the Torres Strait), representing the virus's southernmost range. According to the World Health Organization (WHO), JE is also endemic to the Western Pacific Islands, but cases are rare, possibly due to an enzootic cycle that does not sustain continuous viral transmission. Epidemics in these islands likely occur only when the virus is introduced from other JE-endemic regions. In the early 2020s, JE had become endemic in the southern parts of Australia with locally contracted human fatalities from the disease being recorded in these areas for the first time.
