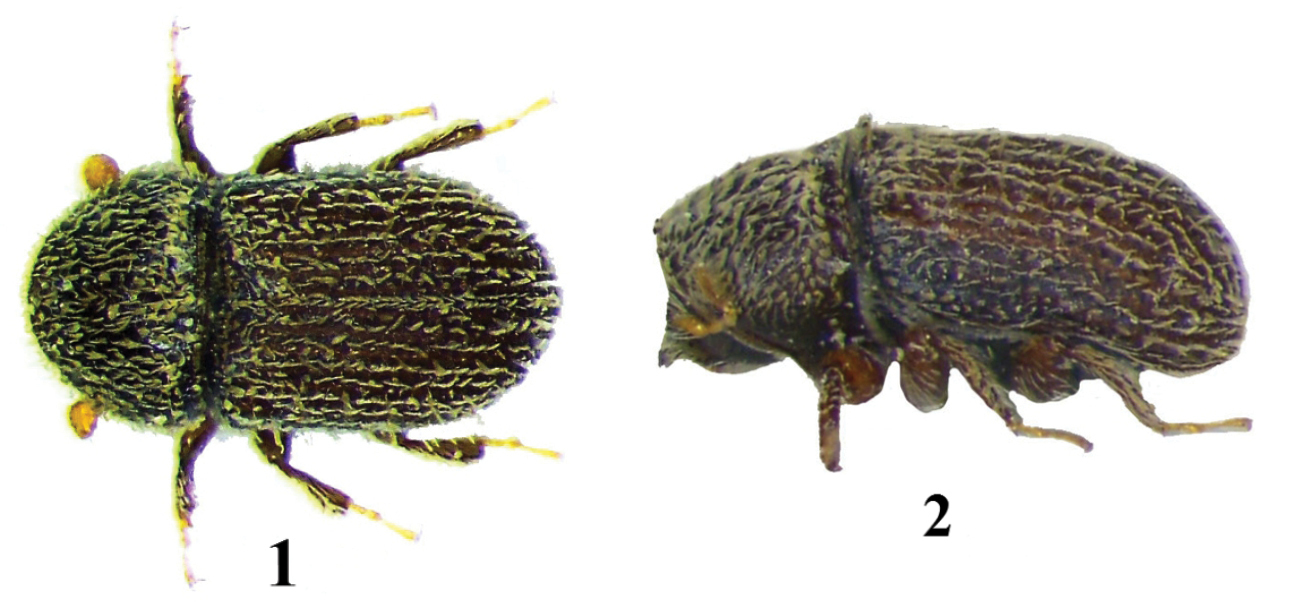

Scientific classification
- Kingdom: Animalia
- Phylum: Arthropoda
- Clade: Pancrustacea
- Class: Insecta
- Order: Coleoptera
- Suborder: Polyphaga
- Infraorder: Cucujiformia
- Family: Curculionidae
- Genus: Hypoborus
- Species: H. ficus

Binomial name
- Hypoborus ficus Erichson, 1836

Synonyms
- Hypoborus fici Dejean, 1837; Hypoborus mori Aubé, 1862; Hypoborus genistae Aubé, 1862; Hypoborus cinereotestaceus Motschulsky, 1866; Hypoborus nebulosus Motschulsky, 1866; Hypoborus hispidus Ferrari, 1867; Hypoborus siculus Ferrari, 1867; Hypoborus setosus Eichhoff, 1868; Hypoborus tanganyikaensis Schedl, 1972

= Hypoborus ficus =

Species of beetle

Hypoborus ficus, the fig bark beetle, is a species of weevil found in many European, Mediterranean and Asian countries.

== Description ==
A polyphagous species with many host plants such as Ficus carica, Ailanthus altissima, Styarax officinalis and Vitis vinifera.
