= Matthew Schrader =

American artist, educator (born 1981)

Matthew Schrader (1984) is an American visual artist, and educator. Schrader teaches at Middlebury College and the Milton Avery School of Fine Arts at Bard College, where he was the co-chair of sculpture from 2022-24.

== Early life ==
Matthew Schrader was born in 1984, in Philadelphia, Pennsylvania and raised in the Germantown neighborhood. Schrader received a BFA degree from the Rhode Island School of Design in 2007, and a MFA degree from Bard College in 2015.

== Work ==
Schrader works in sculpture, photography and spatial intervention. He has repeatedly highlighted the invasive plant Ailanthus altissima throughout his work.

In 2021, Schrader had a solo exhibition at White Columns, titled M. Obultra 3, focusing on an editioned portfolio containing a hand-printed woodcut, 7 photographs, a painted wooden object, 3 PVC transparencies, and Ailanthus seed pods installed in the gallery. The portfolio was originally published in 2020 by Éditions M. Obultra.

An installation of Schrader's photographs of the Ailanthus altissima tree species was included in Life Between Buildings, a group exhibition at MoMA PS1 focused on community gardens and art in public space. Curator Jody Graf described Schrader's work as poetic metaphor: "Schrader’s images show the trees growing precariously, stubbornly, in the unlikeliest of places: amid piles of bricks, hugging chain link fences. They lend themselves to metaphor: artists such as David Hammons and musician Cecil Taylor have alluded to them in their works—a poetic history that Schrader builds on."

In 2025, Schrader published a book of photographic research titled Ensemble, alongside his solo exhibition Subsurface at KAJE.

Schrader has shown work at galleries such as Someday Gallery, Franza Kaka, KAJE, White Columns, Anthony Greaney, Nino Mier, Fierman, and Cleopatra's.
