= Owen Johnson (dendrologist) =

British dendrologist

Owen Charles Johnson is a British dendrologist. He has studied and recorded over 60,000 trees around Britain, and has developed skills in field identification.

He grew up in Hastings near Alexandra Park. He graduated from Durham University in 1988 with a degree in English literature. He completed a doctorate on the poetry of Ted Hughes.

He is a Registrar at the Tree Register where he has compiled and written Champion Trees of Britain and Ireland (2003), The Sussex Tree Book (1998), and the Collins Tree Guide, with illustrations by David More. As a naturalist, he manages a Local Nature Reserve near his home in St Leonards for the Sussex Wildlife Trust. He has also served as a volunteer leader for The Conservation Volunteers's weekly conservation tasks since 1995.

He was appointed a Member of the Order of the British Empire (MBE) in the 2019 New Year Honours for services to the Environment. In 2020 he was awarded the Veitch Memorial Medal by the Royal Horticultural Society.
