= Tripdiolide =

Names
- Preferred IUPAC name (3bS,4aS,5aS,6R,6aR,7aS,7bS,8aS,8bS,10S)-6,10-Dihydroxy-8b-methyl-6a-(propan-2-yl)-3b,4,4a,5a,6,6a,7a,7b,8a,8b,9,10-dodecahydrotris(oxireno)[2′,3′:4b,5;2′′,3′′:6,7;2′′′,3′′′:8a,9]phenanthro[1,2-c]furan-1(3H)-one
- Other names Triptodiolide

Identifiers
CAS Number	38647-10-8
3D model (JSmol)	Interactive image
ChEBI	CHEBI:9740
ChemSpider	259792
KEGG	C09202
PubChem CID	294491
UNII	7VRC678RTA
CompTox Dashboard (EPA)	DTXSID401045708
- InChI: InChI=1S/C20H24O7/c1-7(2)18-13(26-18)14-20(27-14)17(3)5-10(21)12-8(6-24-15(12)22)9(17)4-11-19(20,25-11)16(18)23/h7,9-11,13-14,16,21,23H,4-6H2,1-3H3/t9-,10-,11-,13-,14-,16+,17-,18-,19+,20+/m0/s1 Key: PUJWFVBVNFXCHZ-SQEQANQOSA-N
- SMILES: CC(C)[C@@]12[C@@H](O1)[C@H]3[C@@]4(O3)[C@]5(C[C@@H](C6=C([C@@H]5C[C@H]7[C@]4([C@@H]2O)O7)COC6=O)O)C

Properties
Chemical formula	C_{20}H_{24}O_{7}
Molar mass	376.405 g·mol^{−1}
- Except where otherwise noted, data are given for materials in their standard state (at 25 °C [77 °F], 100 kPa). Infobox references

Tripdiolide is an anti-inflammatory isolate of Tripterygium wilfordii.
