= Gordon Young (football manager) =

Scottish football manager

Personal information
- Place of birth: Scotland

Managerial career
- Years: Team
- 2000–2013: Motherwell (youth)
- 2010: Motherwell
- 2013–2015: Sheffield United (youth)
- 2016: Dundee United (caretaker)
- 2016: East Fife (assistant)
- 2017: Impact Soccer Club
- 2018: Falkirk (assistant)
- 2018: Latvia (assistant)
- 2018–2019: Liepāja
- 2019–2022: Cove Rangers (assistant)
- 2022: Hartlepool United (assistant)
- 2023–2024: Cove Rangers (assistant)
- 2024-Present: Hamilton Academical (academy director)

Gordon Young is a Scottish football manager who was assistant manager of Hartlepool United. Gordon is now emerging talent scout with Tottenham Hotspur.

== Career ==
Young started his managerial career as youth manager of Scottish top flight side Motherwell. In 2010, he was appointed manager of Motherwell. In 2013, he was appointed youth manager of Sheffield United in the English third division. In May 2016, following the departure of Mixu Paatelainen, Young was appointed caretaker manager of Scottish top flight club Dundee United for their two remaining league matches following their relegation from the Scottish Premiership. Following this, he was appointed assistant manager of East Fife in Scottish League Two.

In 2017, he was appointed manager of American youth team Impact Soccer Club. In 2018, Young was appointed assistant manager of Falkirk in the Scottish Championship. After that, he was appointed assistant manager of the Latvian National Team. After that, he was then appointed manager of Latvian club side Liepāja. In 2019, Young was appointed assistant manager of Cove Rangers in the Scottish League Two.
