= Elbert Luther Little =

American botanist (1907–2004)

- Born: Elbert Luther Little Jr. October 15, 1907; Fort Smith, Arkansas, U.S.
- Died: June 18, 2004 (aged 96)
- Occupation: Botanist
- Scientific career
- Fields: Botany

Elbert Luther Little, Jr. (October 15, 1907, in Fort Smith, Arkansas; – June 18, 2004) was an American botanist whose career spanned 70 years and largely concerned forest botany. Although he was born in Arkansas, and died in Oregon, he grew up in Muskogee, Oklahoma, from the age of two and spent much of his life in Arlington, Virginia. Little served as chief dendrologist for the United States Forest Service from 1967 to 1975 and was the author of the National Audubon Society's Field Guide to Trees (1980).https://id.loc.gov/authorities/names/n80057318.html In life he was honored by the Oklahoma Forestry Association and the Oklahoma Academy of Science.
