= Culex bitaeniorhynchus =

Scientific classification
- Domain: Eukaryota
- Kingdom: Animalia
- Phylum: Arthropoda
- Class: Insecta
- Order: Diptera
- Family: Culicidae
- Genus: Culex
- Species: C. bitaeniorhynchus

Binomial name
- Culex bitaeniorhynchus Giles, 1901

Synonyms
- Culex ethiopicus Edwards, 1912; Culex karatsuensis Mochizuki, 1913; Culicelsa abdominalis Taylor, 1913; Grabhamia ambiguus Theobald, 1903; Grabhamia taeniarostris Theobald, 1907; Oculeomyia sarawaki Theobald, 1907; Taeniorhynchus ager Giles, 1901; Taeniorhynchus domesticus Leicester, 1908; Taeniorhynchus ocellata Theobald, 1907; Taeniorhynchus tenax Theobald, 1901

Species of mosquito

Culex (Oculeomyia) bitaeniorhynchus is a species of mosquito belonging to the genus Culex. It is a cosmopolitan species which can be found in all continents, except America and Antarctica.

== Bionomics ==
Larva can be found in pools with stagnant waters containing Spirogyra. Females are blood feeders of birds and sometimes humans. Adults and larva can be naturally infected with Wuchereria bancrofti and Batai virus in India, and Burgia malayi in Sri Lanka. It can also infect Murray Valley encephalitis in Australia.
