= Alan Mitchell (botanist) =

British forester, dendrologist and botanist (1922–1995)

Alan F. Mitchell (4 November 1922 – 3 August 1995) was a British forester, dendrologist and botanist, and author of several books on trees.

Born in Ilford, Essex, he almost single-handedly measured every notable tree in the British Isles, founding the Tree Register of the British Isles (T.R.O.B.I.), which held records of over 100,000 individual notable trees at the time of his death.

During the Second World War, he served with the Fleet Air Arm in the East Asia. Returning by troop ship in the Red Sea at the end of the war, he pondered his future and decided it would be trees. In 1976, the Royal Forestry Society of England, Wales, and Northern Ireland awarded him its Medal for Distinguished Service to Forestry (gold medal) during a Society meeting at Westonbirt. (From a tribute by Esmond Harris, Quarterly Journal of Forestry, January 1996, page 67).

His 1987 book The Guide to Trees of Canada and North America is dedicated to his sister Christine. The book makes occasional oblique reference to a trip to North America in 1976.

Mitchell's Rule states: "If there are tree stumps or felled trunks nearby, count the annual growth rings and measure the trunk circumference to find local growth rates".

== Selected bibliography ==
- Mitchell, Alan (1972). Conifers in the British Isles. A Descriptive Handbook (PDF). Forestry Commission Booklet 33. illustrated by Christine Darter. London: Her Majesty's Stationery Office. Archived from the original (PDF) on 27 August 2016.
- ——; Jobling, John (1974a). Field recognition of British Elms (PDF). Forestry Commission Booklet 42. illustrated by Christine Darter. London: Her Majesty's Stationery Office. Archived from the original (PDF) on 3 August 2018.
- —— (1974). A Field Guide to the Trees of Britain and Northern Europe. illustrated by Preben Dahlstrom, Ebbe Sunesen and Christine Darter. London / Boston: Collins / Houghton Mifflin Company. ISBN 0-395-19114-9.
- 1980. Native British Trees. Forestry Commission Research Information Note, 53/80/SILS Forestry Commission, Edinburgh.
- 1981. The Gardener's Book of Trees, illustrated by Joanna Langhorne. J.M. Dent, London. ISBN 0-460-86085-2. First published in paperback, with corrections, 1993.
- 1982. The Trees of Britain and Northern Europe. Collins. ISBN 0-00-219037-0 (hbk) ISBN 0-00-219035-4 (pbk)
- 1984. Decorative Trees for Country, Town and Garden. Her Majesty's Stationery Office (HMSO). Written with John Jobling.
- 1985. Champion Trees in the British Isles, with V. E. Hallett & J. E. J. White. Forestry Commission Field Book 10.
- 1987. The Guide to Trees of Canada and North America, illustrated by David More. Dragon's World, Limpsfield and London. ISBN 1-85028-053-3 (hbk).
- 1996 (published posthumously). Mitchell, Alan F.; Mitchell, A. (December 1996). Alan Mitchell's Trees of Britain. Whitman Publishing & Distribution Company. ISBN 978-0-00-219972-8. OCLC 35235667.
