= Gordon Young (rugby union) =

Irish rugby union player

- Born: 21 June 1887 Carrigaline, Cork, Ireland
- Died: 8 April 1958 (aged 70)

Rugby union career
- Position: Fullback
International career
Years	Team	Apps	(Points)
1913	Ireland	1	(0)

Gordon Young (21 June 1887 – 8 April 1958) was an Irish international rugby union player.

Young was born in Carrigaline, County Cork, and attended University College Cork, where he played varsity rugby.

A fullback, Young received his only Ireland cap in a match against England at Lansdowne Road in 1913. His tackling brought about some criticism in an Ireland loss, but he was hampered by both concussion and a broken finger.

== See also ==
- List of Ireland national rugby union players
