= David More =

Botanical illustrator

David More is a Scottish botanical illustrator.

David John More was born on 16 September 1954 in Dingwall, Ross and Cromarty. His mother was from Scalpay in the Outer Hebrides and his father from Wick, Caithness. He was educated at Sidcup School, Kent, then studied art at Orpington College. He worked in the hydrographic service of the Royal Navy and in the cartographic branches of an oil company and of the Department of the Environment, before turning to a career as illustrator. He has been a botanical illustrator for many years, and, as well as his books, has received commissions from institutions such as the BBC, the Oxford University Press, the Encyclopaedia Britannica, the World Wildlife Fund, The Walt Disney Company, and the Irish Electricity Board.

Notable books he has illustrated include Trees of North America (1982), with text by Alan Mitchell, the Illustrated Encyclopedia of Trees with text by John White (originally published as Cassell's Trees of Britain and Northern Europe, 2003), and the Collins Tree Guide: the most complete field guide to the trees of Britain and Europe (2004), with text by Owen Johnson. The first was superseded in 2014 by his two volumes, Trees of Eastern North America (covering 825 native and naturalised trees and taking in northern Canada) and Trees of Western North America (covering 630), both published by Princeton University Press.

He has also contributed artwork for many other books, magazines and posters, including a design for the Natural History Museum in London, has exhibited works at the St Mawes Art Gallery, Cornwall, and has worked as an art instructor.

He works in pastels for botanical illustrations, and in oils for cityscapes and landscapes.

== As sole illustrator ==
- Collins Gem Guides: Trees (Harper Collins, 1980; text by Alastair Fitter)
- The Complete Guide to Trees of Britain and Northern Europe (Dragon's World, Limpsfield and London, 1985; text by Alan Mitchell)
- The Trees of Canada (Dragon's World, Limpsfield and London, 1982; text by Alan Mitchell)
- The Trees of North America (Dragon's World, Limpsfield and London, 1982; text by Alan Mitchell)
- The Guide to Trees of Canada and North America (Dragon's World, Limpsfield and London, 1987; text by Alan Mitchell)
- The Concise Illustrated Book of Trees (Troddy Books / Brian Trodd publishing house, 1990; text by Philip Perry)
- Cassell's Trees of Britain and Northern Europe: Over 1800 Species and Cultivars (Cassell, London, 2003; text by John White; US edition: The Illustrated Encyclopedia of Trees, Timber Press, Portland, Oregon, 2003); some 1000 trees illustrated
- Collins Tree Guide: the most complete field guide to the trees of Britain and Europe (Collins, London, 2004; text by Owen Johnson); some 1500 trees illustrated
- Trees of Eastern North America (Princeton University Press, 2014; text by Gil Nelson, Christopher J. Earle, Richard Spellenberg)
- Trees of Western North America (Princeton UP, 2014; text by Gil Nelson, Christopher J. Earle, Richard Spellenberg)

== As contributing illustrator ==
- Trees of the British Isles (Orbis, London, 1984; text by Barry Tebbs)
- The Concise Illustrated Book of Whales and Dolphins (Brian Trodd publishing house, 1990; text by Ray Gambrell)
- The Pocket Guide to Wild Flowers of Britain and Northern Europe (Dragon's World, Limpsfield and London, 1992; text by Pamela Forey)
- Incredible Plants (Time-Life Education, 1997; text by Lesley Dow)
- The Living Countryside (Eaglemoss Publications, 1990s)
- Dorling Kindersley Handbooks: Mushrooms (Penguin Books, 2000; text by Thomas Laessoe)
- The Illustrated Encyclopedia of Trees of the World (Anness publishing, Braintree, 2005; text by Tony Russell, Martin Walters, Catherine Cutler)
- Trees of North America, Europe, the UK & Ireland (Pan Macmillan, London, 2026; updated edition of Roger Phillips's guidebook)
