= Michael Dirr =

American horticulturist

- Born: Michael A. Dirr
- Education: Ohio State University (BS, MS); University of Massachusetts Amherst (PhD)
- Occupations: Horticulturist; professor

Michael A. Dirr is an American horticulturist and a professor of horticulture at the University of Georgia. He is an expert on woody plants.

== Education and experience ==
Dirr earned a Bachelors in Science degree in Plant Physiology and a Masters in Science degree in Plant Physiology from Ohio State University and a Ph.D in Plant Physiology from the University of Massachusetts Amherst, in 1972. Upon graduation from the University of Massachusetts, Dirr was an Assistant Professor of Ornamental Horticulture at the University of Illinois, Urbana, where he continued to work until 1978. He then became a Mercer Fellow at the Arnold Arboretum of Harvard University through 1979. In 1979, he became the Director of the University of Georgia Botanical Garden. In 1981, he returned to teach at the University of Georgia and was promoted to Professor in 1984.

Dirr's Georgia Plant Introduction Program has introduced over 40 new cultivars into the nursery trades.

Michael Dirr retired from the University of Georgia in October 2003. He is now active in research and new plant development.

== Publications ==
Dirr has published over 300 scientific and popular publications and has authored seven books. His book, Manual of Woody Landscape Plants: Their Identification, Ornamental Characteristics, Culture and Propagation and Uses has become one of the most widely adopted reference text in the education of Horticulture and Landscape Architecture. It has sold over 250,000 copies. Major works include:

- Dirr, M.A. 2011. Dirr's Encyclopedia of Trees & Shrubs. Timber Pres, Portland, OR (951 p). ISBN 978-0-88192-901-0
- Dirr, M.A. 2002. Dirr's Trees and Shrubs for Warm Climates: An Illustrated Encyclopedia. Timber Press, Portland, Or. (448 p.) ISBN 978-0-88192-525-8
- Dirr, M.A. 1998. Manual of Woody Landscape Plants. Stipes Publishing Co., Champaign, IL. (1453 p.)
- Dirr, M.A. 1997. Dirr's Hardy Trees and Shrubs - An Illustrated Encyclopedia. Timber Press, Portland, OR. (494 p.) ISBN 978-0-88192-404-6
- Dirr, M.A. 1997. Michael A. Dirr's Photo-Library of Woody Landscape Plants on CD-ROM. PlantAmerica, Locust Valley, NY. (4 CDs)

== Awards and honors ==
- Silver Medal for Excellence in Horticultural Writing (2014, Massachusetts Horticultural Society)
- Jackson Dawson Medal for Outstanding Contributions to Plant Propagation (Massachusetts Horticultural Society)
- Silver Seal (National Federation of State Garden Clubs)
- Medal of Honor (1993, Garden Clubs of America)
- Scott Medal (Swarthmore College)
- Honorary Doctorate (1998, University of Massachusetts Amherst) for significant contributions to Horticulture and the University.
