= Ailanthone =

Names
- IUPAC name (1S,4R,5R,7S,11R,13S,17S,18S,19R)-4,5,17-trihydroxy-14,18-dimethyl-6-methylidene-3,10-dioxapentacyclo[9.8.0.0^{1,7}.0^{4,19}.0^{13,18}]nonadec-14-ene-9,16-dione
- Other names: 13,21-Didehydrochaparrinone; (1β,11β,12α)-1,11,12-Trihydroxy-11,20-epoxypicrasa-3,13(21)-diene-2,16-dione

Identifiers
| CAS Number | 981-15-7 |
| 3D model (JSmol) | Interactive image |
| ChemSpider | 65781 |
| ECHA InfoCard | 100.208.660 |
| PubChem CID | 72965 |
| CompTox Dashboard (EPA) | DTXSID10913455 |
- InChI: InChI=1S/C20H24O7/c1-8-4-12(21)16(24)18(3)10(8)5-13-19-7-26-20(25,17(18)19)15(23)9(2)11(19)6-14(22)27-13/h4,10-11,13,15-17,23-25H,2,5-7H2,1,3H3/t10-,11-,13+,15+,16+,17+,18+,19+,20-/m0/s1 Key: WBBVXGHSWZIJST-RLQYZCPESA-N; InChI=1/C20H24O7/c1-8-4-12(21)16(24)18(3)10(8)5-13-19-7-26-20(25,17(18)19)15(23)9(2)11(19)6-14(22)27-13/h4,10-11,13,15-17,23-25H,2,5-7H2,1,3H3/t10-,11-,13+,15+,16+,17+,18+,19+,20-/m0/s1 Key: WBBVXGHSWZIJST-RLQYZCPEBG
- SMILES: CC1=CC(=O)[C@H]([C@]2([C@H]1C[C@@H]3[C@]45[C@@H]2[C@]([C@@H](C(=C)[C@@H]4CC(=O)O3)O)(OC5)O)C)O

Properties
| Chemical formula | C_{20}H_{24}O_{7} |
| Molar mass | 376.405 g·mol^{−1} |
- Except where otherwise noted, data are given for materials in their standard state (at 25 °C [77 °F], 100 kPa). Infobox references

Ailanthone is a quassinoid allelochemical produced by the tree Ailanthus altissima (commonly known as tree of heaven). It is a key agent behind the tree's strong allelopathic effects, which inhibit the growth of competing plants by suppressing seed germination and disrupting root elongation. Native to China, Ailanthus altissima has become one of the worst invasive species in North America and Europe, where ailanthone is known to contribute significantly to its competitive spread.

Tree of heaven has been used in traditional Chinese medicine, and ailanthone has been found to have anti-inflammatory and antimalarial effects. The chemical also has been found to have potential anti-tumor activity, inhibiting cell proliferation and inducing apoptosis.
