= Triptolidenol =

Names
- Preferred IUPAC name (3bS,4aS,5aS,6R,6aR,7aS,7bS,8aS,9bS)-6-Hydroxy-6a-(2-hydroxypropan-2-yl)-8b-methyl-3b,4,4a,5a,6,6a,7a,7b,8a,8b,9,10-dodecahydrotris(oxireno)[2′,3′:4b,5;2′′,3′′:6,7;2′′′,3′′′:8a,9]phenanthro[1,2-c]furan-1(3H)-one

Identifiers
CAS Number	99694-86-7
3D model (JSmol)	Interactive image
ChEBI	CHEBI:132333
ChemSpider	2343081
PubChem CID	3086461
UNII	8BBS7D4LA5
CompTox Dashboard (EPA)	DTXSID60244206
- InChI: InChI=1S/C20H24O7/c1-16(2,23)19-12(26-19)13-20(27-13)17(3)5-4-8-9(7-24-14(8)21)10(17)6-11-18(20,25-11)15(19)22/h10-13,15,22-23H,4-7H2,1-3H3/t10-,11-,12-,13-,15-,17-,18+,19-,20+/m0/s1 Key: APBNDXHFQWSYOS-KSYZUNFVSA-N
- SMILES: C[C@]12CCC3=C([C@@H]1C[C@H]4[C@@]5([C@@]26[C@@H](O6)[C@H]7[C@@]([C@H]5O)(O7)C(C)(C)O)O4)COC3=O

Properties
Chemical formula	C_{20}H_{24}O_{7}
Molar mass	376.405 g·mol^{−1}
- Except where otherwise noted, data are given for materials in their standard state (at 25 °C [77 °F], 100 kPa). Infobox references

Triptolidenol is a bioactive diterpene created by Tripterygium wilfordii.
