= Autotoxicity =

Autotoxicity, meaning self-toxicity, is a biological phenomenon whereby a species inhibits growth or reproduction of other members of its species through the production of chemicals released into the environment. Like allelopathy, it is a type of interference competition but it is technically different: autotoxicity contributes to intraspecific competition, whereas allelopathic effects refer to interspecific competition. Furthermore, autotoxic effects are always inhibitory, whereas allelopathic effects are not necessarily inhibitory–they may stimulate other organisms.

This mechanism will result in reduced exploitative competition between members of the same species and may contribute to natural thinning in established communities. Inhibition of the growth of young plants will increase the availability of nutrients to older, established plants.

In cultivation, autotoxicity can make it difficult or impossible to grow the same species after harvest of a crop. For example, this is known in alfalfa and the tree Cunninghamia lanceolata Other species displaying autotoxicity include the rush Juncus effusus and the grass Lolium rigidum.

== In alfalfa ==
Autotoxicity in alfalfa is produced from the first seeding of the plant. The plant emits a chemical or chemicals into the soil that reduce the effectiveness of further alfalfa seedings. Studies show that the chemical is extractable from fresh alfalfa, is water-soluble, reduces germination, and prevents root growth. Some believe that a chemical called medicarpin is responsible for autotoxicity. Roots of affected plants can be swollen, curled, discolored, and lack root hairs. Lack of root hairs reduces the plants ability to gather nutrients and absorb water. Crop rotation is used to counteract autotoxicity in alfalfa.
