= Gordon Young (journalist) =

American journalist and educator

Gordon Young is an American journalist and educator based in San Francisco, California, who writes about urban planning issues and the problems facing deindustrialized cities and towns, especially his hometown of Flint, Michigan. He is a senior lecturer in the Communication Department at Santa Clara University and has lived in San Francisco since 1996.

His book Teardown: Memoir of a Vanishing City was named a Michigan Notable Book and a finalist for the 33rd Annual Northern California Book Award for Creative NonFiction. Michael Moore praised Teardown as "a brilliant chronicle of the Mad Maxization of a once-great American city."

Young's journalism work has appeared in The New York Times, Politico, Slate, Washington City Paper, Next City, Belt Magazine, Utne Reader, the San Jose Mercury-News and numerous other publications. He publishes the blog Flint Expatriates. His writing is also featured in "Happy Anyway: A Flint Anthology" and "Dispatches from the Rust Belt: The Best of Belt Year One."
