= Arts and culture in Stamford, Connecticut =

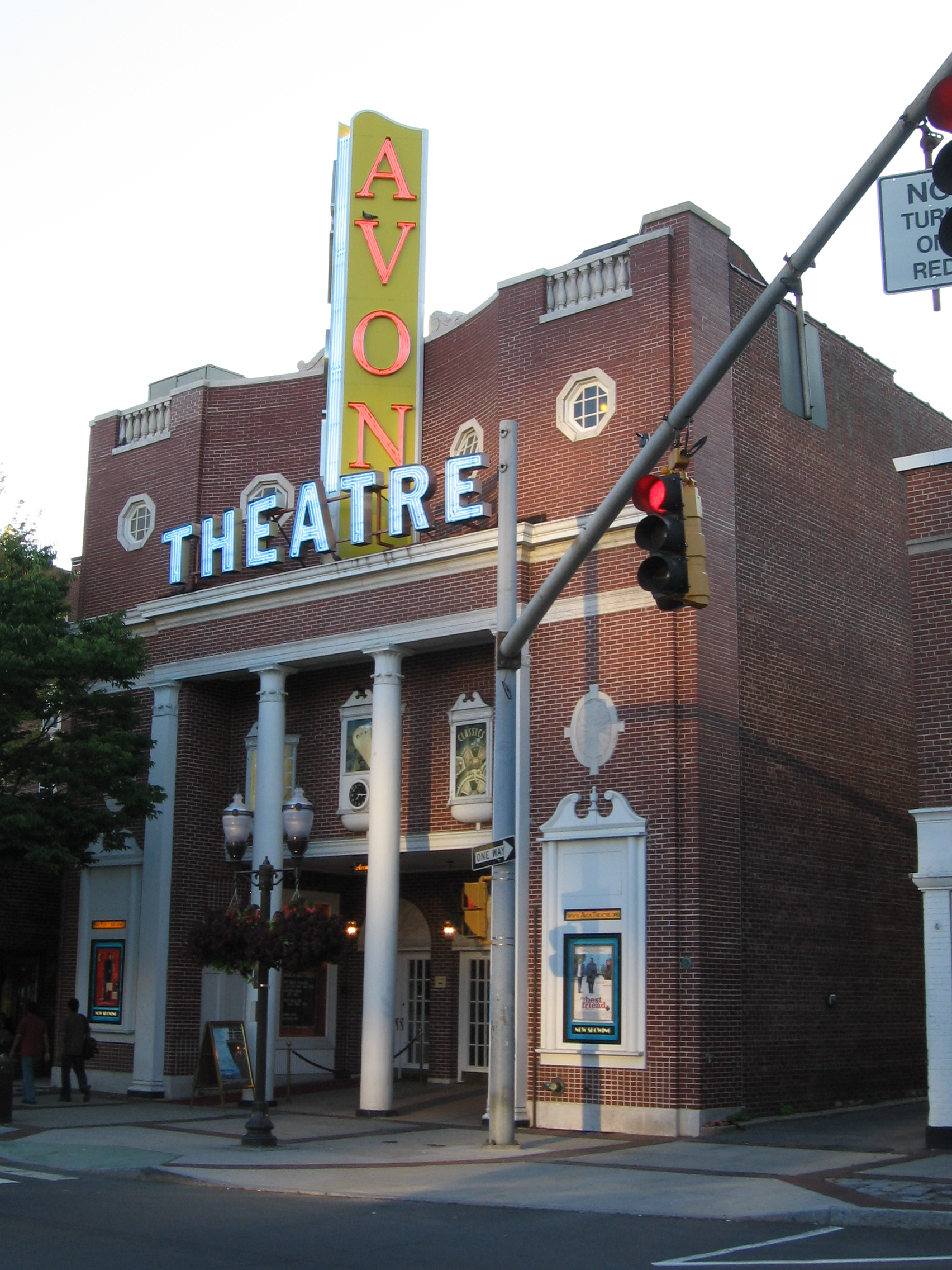
Avon Theatre on Bedford Street

In 2017, the City of Stamford established the Stamford Arts and Culture Commission to help bolster arts and tourism in the city.

== Theatre and film ==
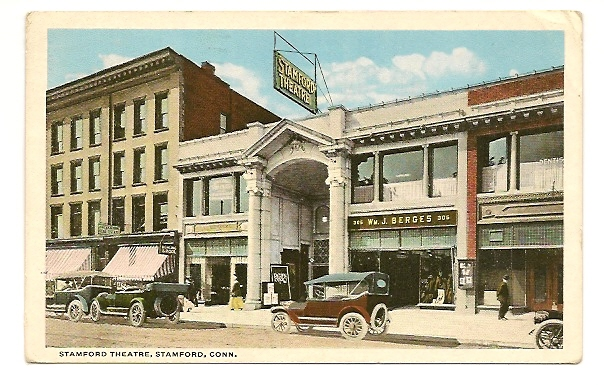
Stamford Theatre, about 1919

Prior to its demolition due to a devastating fire, Stamford's town hall included a theater on the third floor beginning in the 1870s. Edwin Booth, a Cos Cob, Connecticut resident, is said to have acted in that theater. The nearby Grand Opera House, which stood on the site of the Palace Theatre, burned down as well.

The Alhambra Theatre was on what is currently called Washington Boulevard, which later sprang up and was in operation as early as 1909. It provided "High-Class Vaudeville", namely due to its lack of profanity. In 1914, Emily Wakeman Hartley founded the Stamford Theatre at the corner of what is now Atlantic Street and Tresser Boulevard. Wakeman became manager of the theater, which hosted many famous performers of the day. Most notably in 1924, Humphrey Bogart acted in a supporting role in the comedy, Fool's Gold. In 1927, Bela Lugosi starred in Dracula: The Vampire Play four years before he played the same role in the film. George Gershwin's first Broadway show, La La Lucille played in the theater in 1919, and in 1921, the Al Jolson-produced play, Lei Aloha opened at the theater, six years before Jolson's debut in The Jazz Singer. In 1928, the theater advertised a Sunday performance of the "World's Greatest Pianist", Sergei Rachmaninoff, calling him simply "Rachmaninoff".

=== Current theatre and film venues ===
- 'Stamford Center for the Arts: The Palace Theatre, originally opened as a vaudeville house in 1927 and gradually fell into disrepair and disuse, reopened as a restored, nonprofit theater in 1983. It was joined in 1992 by the Rich Forum, another downtown venue. Both have been run by the Stamford Center for the Arts. In 2005, the Palace Theatre completed a major renovation. With the depth doubled behind the stage to about 40 feet (12 m), the 1,600-seat theater can now present more technically ambitious productions such as full-fledged Broadway musicals.
- Rich Forum: Built-in 1992, the Rich Forum has served as a pre-Broadway house for numerous shows including Voices in the Dark, Fortune's Fool, and More to Love. Since 2009, the Rich Forum has served as the studio for The Jerry Springer Show, Maury, and The Steve Wilkos Show, among other NBCUniversal shows.
- Curtain Call Inc. presents plays and other entertainment at the Sterling Farms Theatre Complex, 1349 Newfield Ave. Its venues and types of entertainment there include the Kweskin Theatre and Shakespeare in the Park.
- Avon Theatre Film Center, a nonprofit movie house focusing on classic, alternative, and art films, opened in the former Avon Theatre on Bedford Street in 2004.
- Bowtie Theatres has two movie houses in Stamford with 15 movie screens: the Landmark and the Majestic.
- In Springdale, the two-screen State Cinema, run by Garden Homes Cinemas of Stamford, has second-run films.
- Mill River Park and Commons Park in Harbor Point both have summer "Movies in the Park" lineups

== Music and dance ==
- Stamford Symphony Orchestra In a typical season, the SSO gives five pairs of classical concerts and three pops concerts at the 1,586-seat Palace Theatre, as well as a concert for elementary school students and a family concert series. Organized in 1919, the orchestra closed down after World War II when too many of its European musicians returned home. In 1967 the orchestra was revived and became fully professional by 1974, when Skitch Henderson was appointed music director. Henderson's reign was interrupted in January 1975 by a prison sentence for tax evasion. The current music director is Eckart Preu, appointed in June 2005.
- Connecticut Grand Opera, a not-for-profit, professional opera company founded in 1993, with offices at 15 Bank Street and performances at the Palace Theatre. On its website, the CGO claims to offer "the most ambitious opera season of any company between New York and Boston."
- Connecticut Ballet is the state's professional ballet company. The company's artistic mission is the presentation of the highest quality professional classical and contemporary ballet. The company frequently performs at the Palace Theatre, and is known for their annual holiday performance of The Nutcracker.
- Alive@Five Summer Concert Series was one of the city's largest annual events since Stamford Downtown run the series in 1997, it featured legendary musicians such as Boyz II Men, Gavin DeGraw, Andy Grammar, Sean Kingston, Sugar Ray, CeeLo Green, Foreigner, Shaggy, Third Eye Blind, Rachel Platten, ABBA, The Beach Boys and The B-52s to name a few.

== Distinctive architecture ==
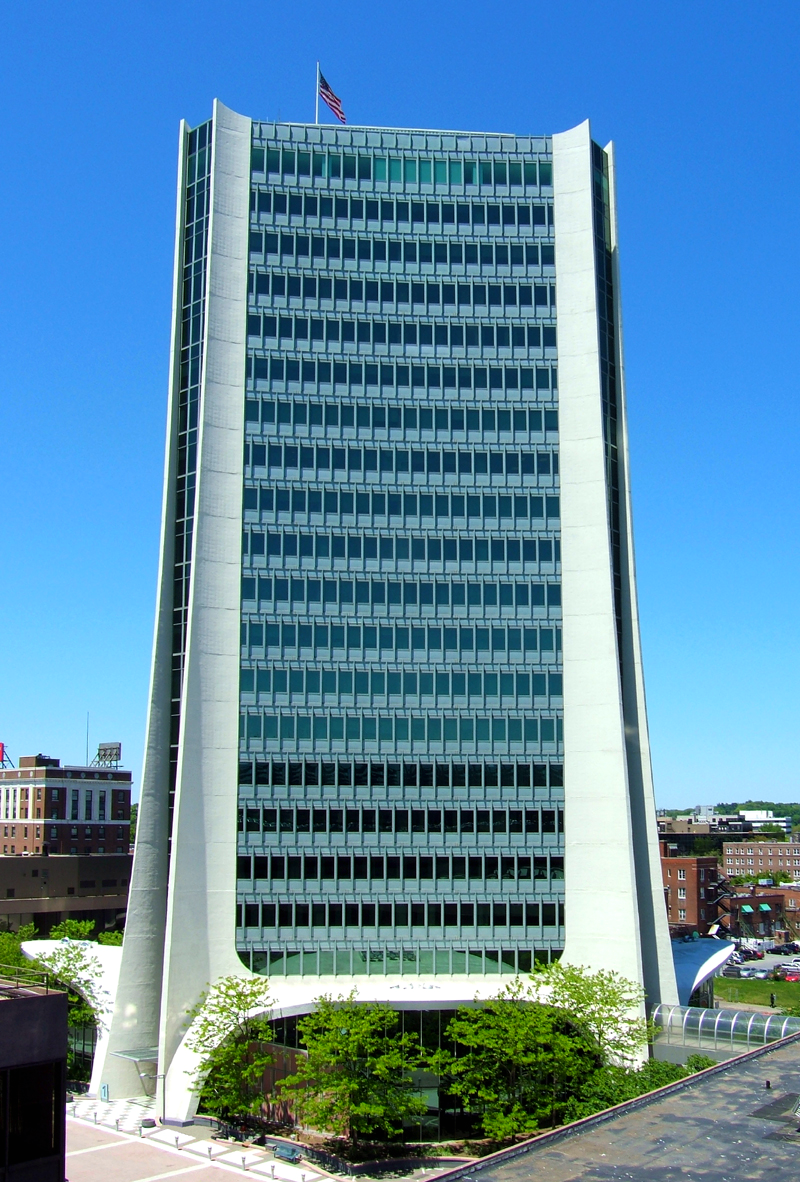
- One Landmark Square, one of Stamford's most distinctive buildings
- One Landmark Square - Completed in 1973, the Victor Bisharat designed tower was the tallest building between New York and Boston from 1973 until 2010. It is one of the most recognizable buildings in Stamford, and has been compared to both the TWA Flight Center and the Cathedral of Brasilia.
- Fish Church - The First Presbyterian Church of Stamford, is a church in Stamford, Connecticut designed by architect Wallace K. Harrison. Nicknamed Fish Church, for its unusual shape, it is a unique example of modernist architecture, and an architectural landmark. Its 260-foot-tall (79 m) Maguire Memorial Tower holds a 56-bell carillon.
- St. Mary Roman Catholic Church - Completed in 1928 on Elm Street is modelled on a Gothic church in Europe and is the largest house of worship in Fairfield County.
- 1 High Ridge Park - Completed in the late 1960s, the building looks like a fortress, complete with a moat (previously filled with water, it is now dry). Bridges lead to its entrances. It was built for CBS Research, a company worried about its security. Originally, the building had few or no windows facing outward and tenants saw the sunlight through atriums and skylights. In the 1970s, after CBS Research left, slit-like window areas were inserted into the outside walls, letting in some light.
- 2 High Ridge Park - The saucer-like building recalled clocks and watches. The building was originally built for General Time, a large clock manufacturer. It has been compared to a flying saucer, a concrete bowl, and a clock.
- The Stamford Cone is a stained-glass pavilion, commissioned by the Swiss Bank Corporation from the artist Brian Clarke for their headquarters building as part of a 1990s regeneration programmer. The 45-foot public artwork, in Gateway Commons park next to the Stamford Transportation Center, was visible to commuters on the Amtrak and vehicular traffic on the Interstate 95, as a beacon when internally lit at night, and an interior that was accessible to the public by day.

== Science and nature ==
In the 20th century, particularly after World War II, educational institutions were founded in the city or expanded in a range of areas.

- From its founding in 1936 until 1945, the Stamford Museum & Nature Center (then known as "The Stamford Museum") was in a few rented rooms downtown. It established the first small planetarium between New York and Boston in 1941 when it had a 6-inch (wide) telescope and a dome made of wood slats and cardboard. In the 1950s, the museum had to move again when Interstate 95 was built, and it went to a 118-acre (0.48 km^{2}) site at the northern end of town. It has a collection of works by Gutzon Borglum, the sculptor of Mount Rushmore, who was a Stamford resident for a decade.

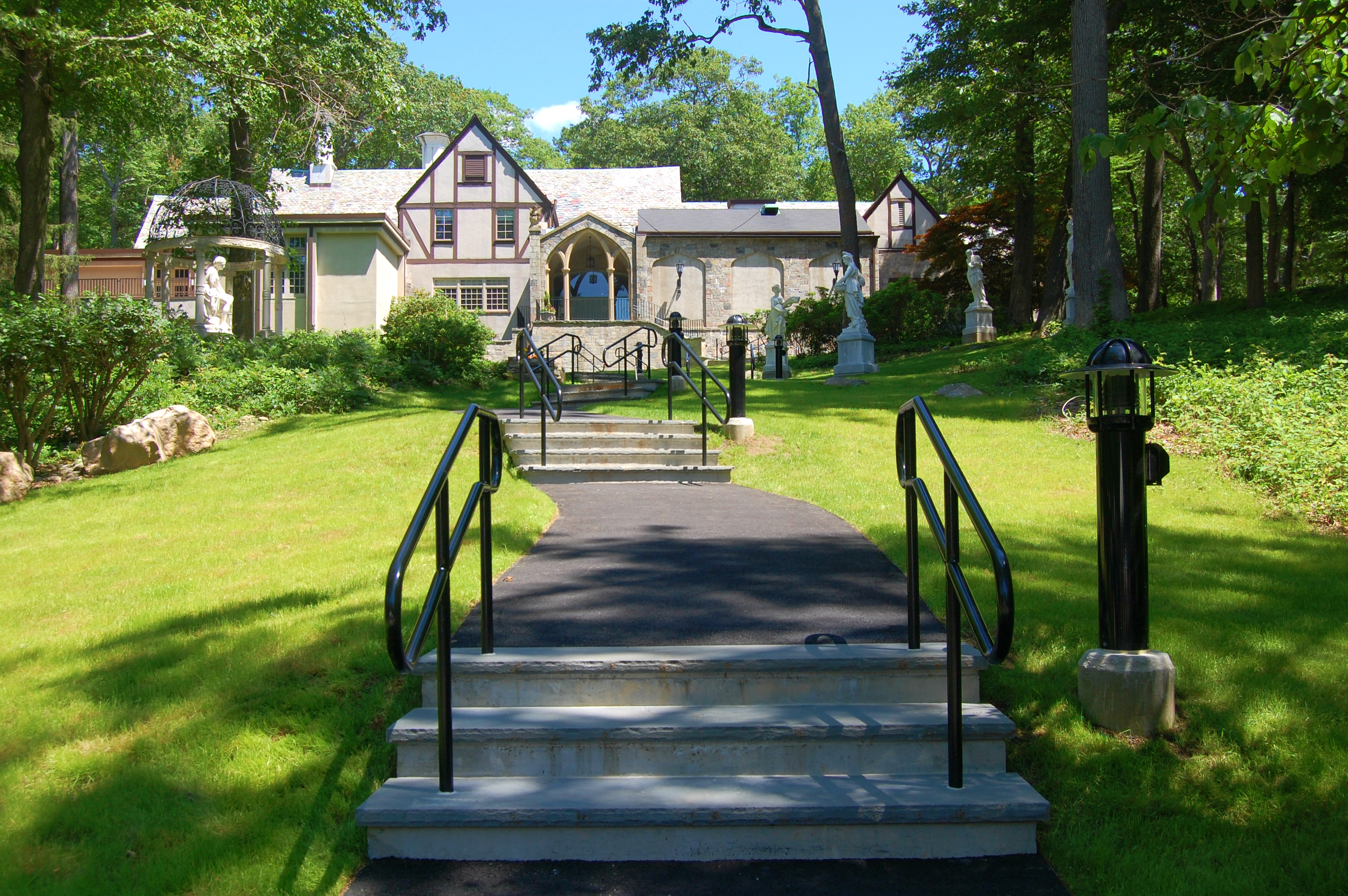
Bendel Mansion at the Stamford Museum & Nature Center

The nature center's farm includes llamas, pigs, and sheep. In early 2007, more than seven lambs were born at the farm, as well as some piglets. The sheep are mixtures of Jacob, Dorset, and Black Welsh Mountain sheep breeds.

- The Fairfield County Astronomy Society was started up in 1956 and ran the new Stamford Observatory. A 20-inch (510 mm) telescope, made with donated materials from numerous businesses, most notably the Perkin-Elmer Corporation (then headquartered in Norwalk) was dedicated on June 13, 1965. Since the relatively large telescope went into operation, the astronomy club has conducted research and for a time became the home of the Journal of the American Association of Variable Star Observers.
- Bartlett Arboretum and Gardens. In November 1965, the state of Connecticut bought the 64-acre (260,000 m^{2}) estate of Dr. Francis A. Bartlett, a dendrologist who had planted the site with tree and bush specimens from all over the world. The Arboretum opened to the public for the first time in 1966 and was transferred to the City of Stamford in 2001. Today the Bartlett Arboretum Association runs the institution, and an additional 27 acres (110,000 m^{2}) has been added to the site, giving it 91 acres (370,000 m^{2}).
- Sound Waters Community Center for Environmental Education is in Cove Island Park.

== Visual arts ==
- Stamford Art Association was set up in 1971. It is a non-profit organization that showcases local artists to the public. It is downtown on Franklin St. close to the UConn-Stamford Campus.
- Hoyt-Barnum House is a historic house museum, in a 17th-century structure stated to be the oldest authentic residence in Stamford. Originally built in 1699 by Samuel Hait (or Hoyt), the house contains artifacts from the 18th and 19th centuries, as well as reproduction and facsimile period items. The house was moved from Downtown Stamford to its current home, next to the Stamford History Center, in November 2016 to increase its accessibility to the public.
- Loft Artists Association was set up in 1978. Initially, in the former Yale & Towne Lock factory, which had fallen into disuse, the association in the city's South End is for painters, sculptors, photographers and crafts people. The association moved to another South End location following the purchase of the Yale & Towne factory by developers.
- Ukrainian Museum & Library is the oldest cultural institution established by Ukrainians in North America. It is dedicated to the collection, documentation, preservation and exhibition of artifacts and publications about Ukrainian culture and heritage.
- Stamford Downtown Special Services District holds the annual "Art in Public Spaces" display every summer from June to August.
- Franklin Street Works is a not-for-profit contemporary art space and café.

Examples of two of the painted electrical boxes.

- Stamford Museum & Nature Center as well as being a nature center, also houses an art gallery in the Bendel Mansion, the museum's main building.
- Throughout various parts of the city, electrical boxes are painted as a beautification of the city. There are 190 large grey electrical boxes on street corners in the town. In 1993, the Springdale Neighborhood Association commissioned a local artist to paint the boxes in the section of town to "brighten" up the eyesores. The trend caught on and over 100 boxes have been painted by artists throughout the city.
