= Dendrology =

Science and study of woody plants

Dendrology (Ancient Greek: δένδρον, dendron, "tree"; and Ancient Greek: -λογία, -logia, science of or study of) or xylology (Ancient Greek: ξύλον, ksulon, "wood") is the science and study of woody plants (trees, shrubs, and lianas), specifically, their taxonomic classifications. There is no sharp boundary between plant taxonomy and dendrology; woody plants not only belong to many different plant families, but these families may be made up of both woody and non-woody members. Some families include only a few woody species. Dendrology, as a discipline of industrial forestry, tends to focus on identification of economically useful woody plants and their taxonomic interrelationships. As an academic course of study, dendrology will include all woody plants, native and non-native, that occur in a region. A related discipline is the study of sylvics, which focuses on the autecology of genera and species.

== History ==
In the past, dendrology included the study of the natural history of woody species in specific regions, but this aspect is now considered part of ecology. The field also plays a role in conserving rare or endangered species.

== Relationship with botany ==
Dendrology is a branch of botany that specializes in the characterization and identification of woody plants, while botany is the study of all types of plant throughout the natural world.

== Dendrologists ==
- Mike Baillie, Queen's University of Belfast
- Francis A. Bartlett, founder of Bartlett Arboretum and Gardens and the Bartlett Tree Research Laboratory
- Ludwig Beissner
- William Douglas Cook, founder of Eastwoodhill Arboretum and Pukeiti (New Zealand)
- Michael Dirr
- Maciej Giertych
- Owen Johnson
- Humphry Marshall
- Alan Mitchell
- Alfred Rehder
- Philippe de Spoelberch
- Augustin Pyramus de Candolle
- Nathaniel Lord Britton
- John Claudius Loudon
- Piet de Jong
- Hideaki Ohba
- Birbal Sahni

== See also ==
- Dendrochronology
- Dendroclimatology
- Dendroarchaeology
- Silviculture
- Plant morphology
- World Forestry Congress
