= Friends Seminary =

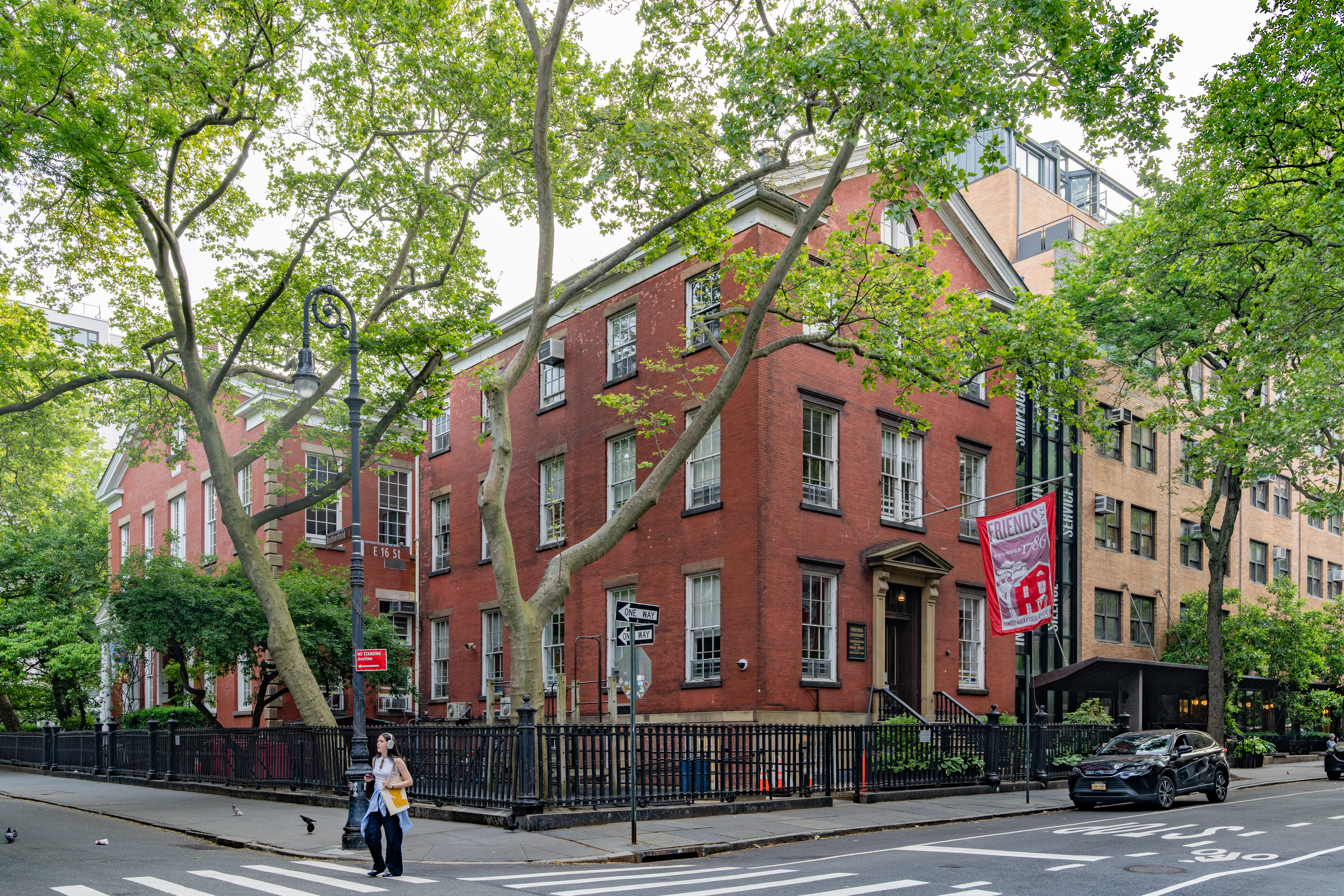
- (2025)

Location
- 222 East 16th Street; New York City, New York 10003; United States; 40°44′02″N 73°59′07″W

Information
- School type: Private
- Religious affiliation: Quaker
- Founded: 1786; 240 years ago
- Principal: Rich Nourie (Interim Head of School)
- Faculty: 176
- Grades: K–12
- Gender: Mixed gender
- Age range: 5-19
- Enrollment: 794 (2022-2023); 308 Upper School; 222 Middle School; 264 Lower School
- Average class size: 18 students
- Campus type: Urban
- Colours: Red and White
- Song: "Alma Mater"
- Athletics: 31 teams
- Mascot: Owl
- Accreditation: NYSAIS
- Newspaper: The Insight
- Tuition: U.S.$53,900.00
- Former name: Founded as Friends Institute (1786-1860)
- Website: www.friendsseminary.org

Friends Seminary is an independent K-12 school in Manhattan, New York, United States. The oldest continuously coeducational school in New York City, in recent years it has served approximately 800 students. While the school was originally created to serve Quaker children, over the years it has also welcomed students from other religious backgrounds.

== History ==
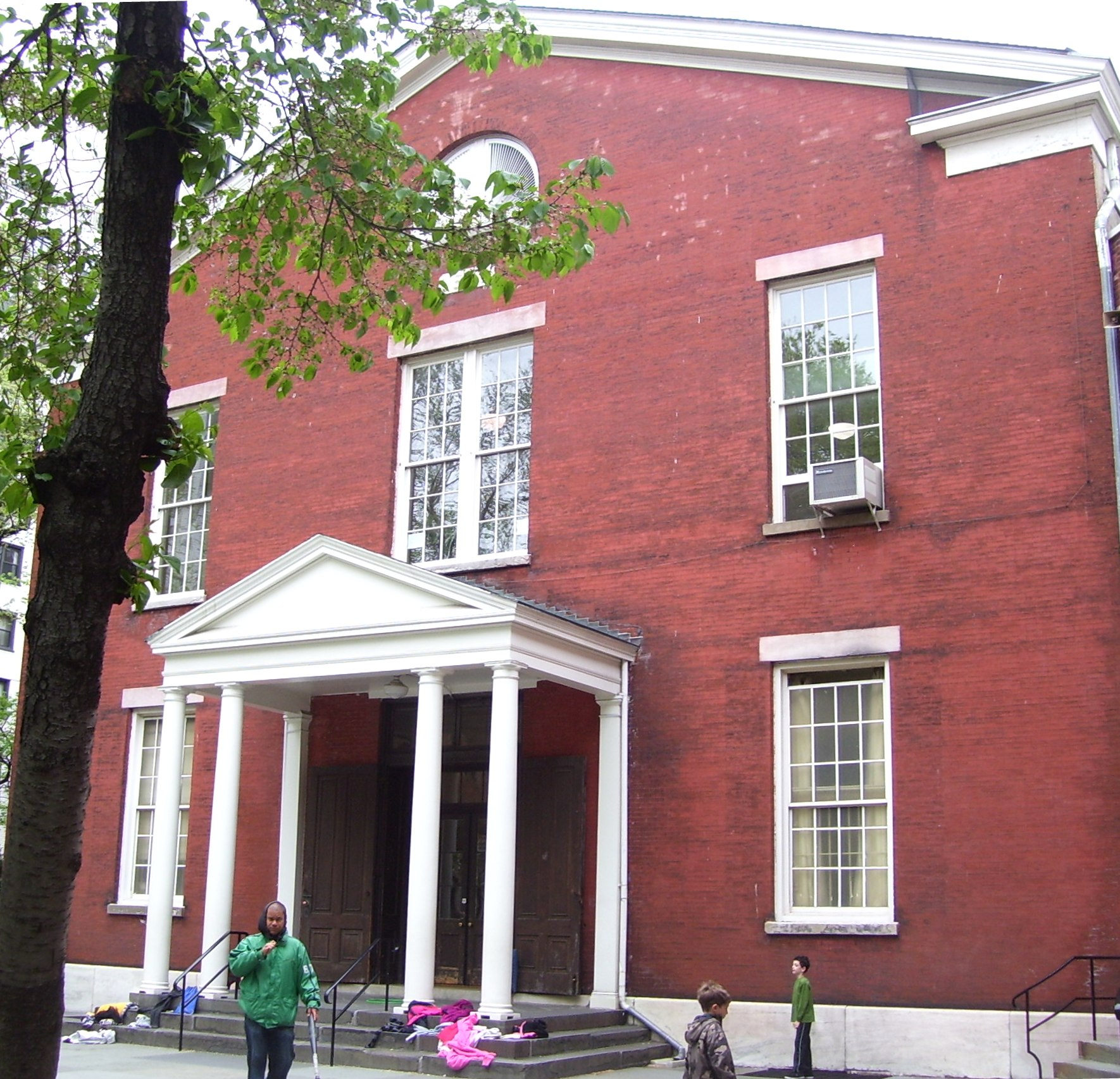
The Meetinghouse

Friends Seminary is the oldest continuously operated, independent, co-educational day school in New York City. Serving students in kindergarten through twelfth grade, the School is chartered by the State of New York and is governed by a twenty-four-member Board of Trustees. Friends Seminary is the only Quaker school in Manhattan.

Friends Seminary, established by members of the Religious Society of Friends, whose members are known as Quakers, was founded in 1786 as Friends' Institute through a $10,000 bequest of Robert Murray, a wealthy New York merchant. It was located on Pearl Street in Manhattan and strived to provide Quaker children with a "guarded education." In 1826, the school was moved to a larger campus on Elizabeth Street. Tuition in that year was $10 or less per annum, except for the oldest students, whose families paid $20. (By 1915, tuition had risen to $250.) The school again moved in 1860 to its current location and changed its name to Friends Seminary.

In 1878, Friends Seminary was one of the earliest schools to establish a Kindergarten. In 1925, it was the first private co-educational school to hire a full-time psychologist. M. Scott Peck, who transferred to Friends from Phillips Exeter in late 1952, praised the school's diversity and nurturing atmosphere. "While at Friends," he wrote, "I awoke each morning eager for the day ahead ... [A]t Exeter, I could barely crawl out of bed."

In 2015, based on recommendations made in 2005 by the Trustees of the New York Quarterly Meeting after completion of a study, the New York Quarterly Meeting reached consensus on the issue of incorporating the school and the New York Quarterly Meeting separately. Under the agreement, Friends Seminary will pay the New York Quarterly Meeting $775,000 annually, and both sides will contribute an additional $175,000 to a capital fund to preserve the historic buildings. The Quakers will continue naming half the members of the school's governing board, and the agreement establishes a six-person committee to foster the school's commitment to Quaker values.

The school's vision is "to prepare students to engage in the world that is and to help bring about a world that ought to be." It is currently guided by a mission statement adopted in 2015, a service learning statement adopted in 2004, a diversity and inclusion mission statement adopted in 2005, and a global education mission statement adopted in 2024. Friends Seminary is a member of New York's Independent School Diversity Network.

== Organization ==
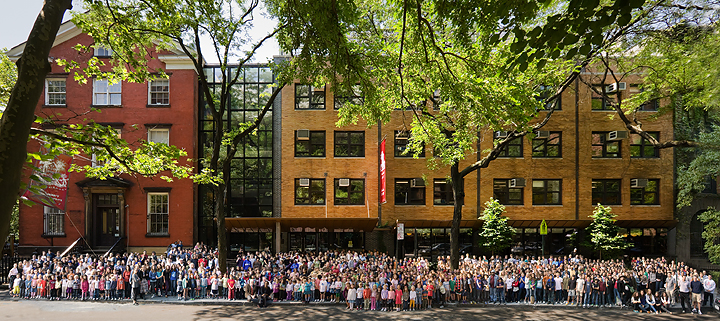
Exterior of Friends Seminary on 16th Street

The school is divided into three sections:

- Lower School - Kindergarten to Grade 4
- Middle School - Grades 5-8
- Upper School - Grades 9-12

== Facilities ==
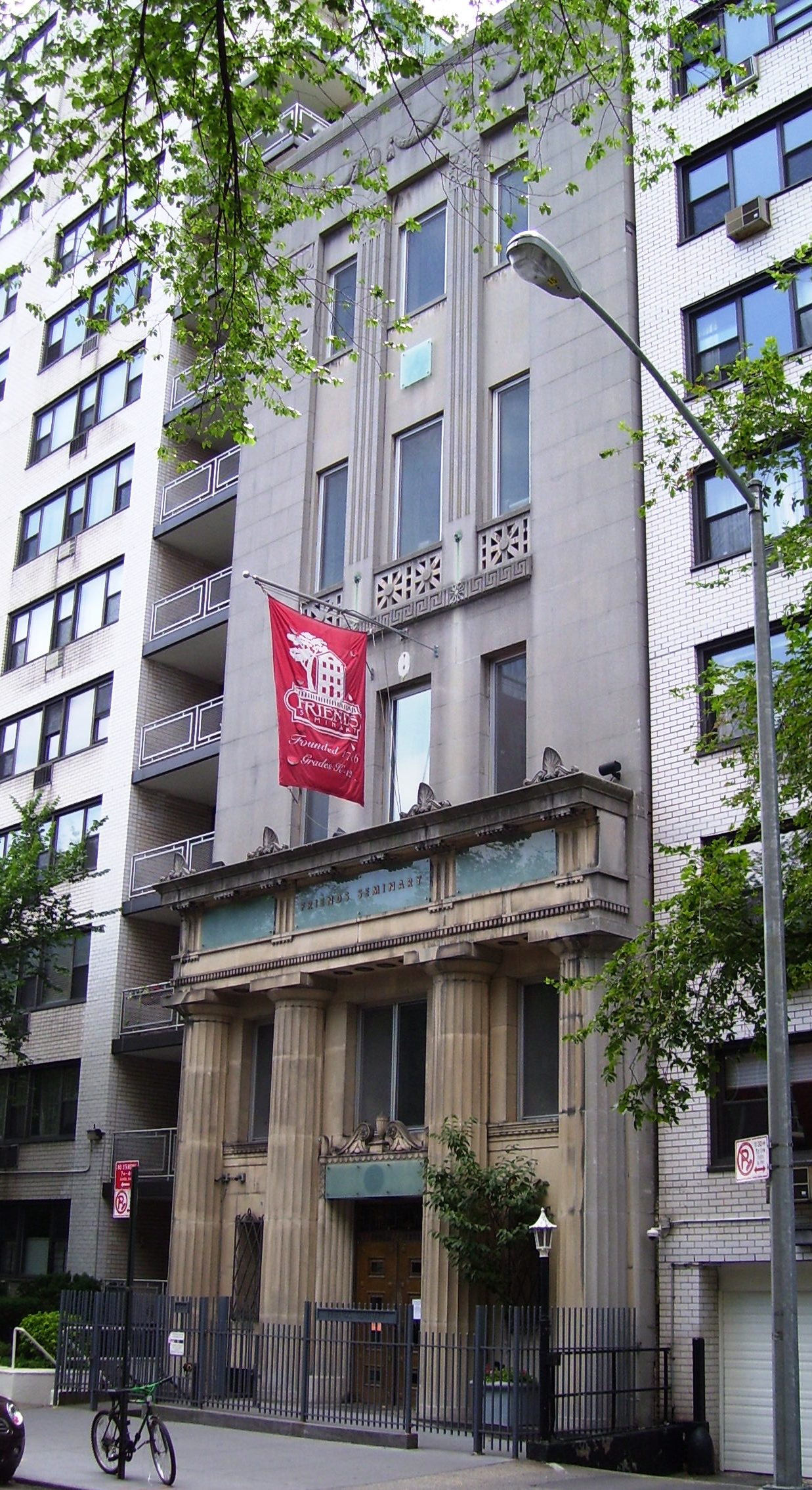
The Annex on East 15th Street, formerly the German Masonic Hall

The campus comprises six buildings. The largest building, known as Hunter Hall, built in 1964, holds classes for the entire Middle School, most of the Lower School and some of the Upper School. The building contains a basement-level gymnasium and cafeteria, library and media center, science laboratories, art studios, computer laboratories and classrooms for all grades.

Attached to the school is the Meetinghouse, a New York City designated landmark built in 1860 and home of the Fifteenth Street Monthly Meeting of The Religious Society of Friends. Outside the front doors of the Meetinghouse is the courtyard used for recess and other activities. Located on 15th Street at Rutherford Place (next to Stuyvesant Square), the Meetinghouse functions both as a place of worship and as a performance space, although in 2011 the school arranged for most performances to be hosted by the Vineyard Theatre on 15th Street. The Meetinghouse also houses the school's music program.

In 1997, the school purchased and renovated a former German Masonic Temple located on 15th Street. The new building, called "The Annex", incorporates "green technology" to create a building with less of an ecological footprint than many other buildings in the city. The Annex includes more science labs, as well as three multi-use classrooms, and a black box theater.

Friends Seminary completed an extensive redevelopment project in 2019. They designed an entirely new structure behind the facades of three 1852 townhouses and connected them seamlessly to the School's main building. The new structure provides separate access for the Upper School, in addition to a "Great Room," which is a multipurpose gathering space that opens onto a courtyard. The new space also features an Upper School Commons and Terrace along with new classrooms are that grouped around shared study and locker areas. A rooftop Greenhouse and play area was also developed.

In 2024 Friends Seminary announced the completion of a new Skyspace by James Turrell, titled Leading.

== Notable alumni ==
- Peter Bart, film producer, journalist and writer
- Malcolm Browne, journalist and photographer
- Henrietta Buckmaster, author
- Caleb Carr, writer
- Richard F. Casten, nuclear physicist
- Mel Cummin, cartoonist
- Wylie Dufresne, chef
- Lena Dunham, actress
- Timothy Foote, journalist
- Max Graham, music producer and DJ
- Emily Wakeman Hartley, founder of the Stamford Theatre
- Roger O. Hirson, dramatist and screenwriter
- Rio Hope-Gund, professional soccer player
- David Isay, radio producer and oral historian
- Michael Kimmelman, New York Times art and architecture critic
- Hilary Knight, cartoonist
- Chi Ossé, politician and activist
- Will Menaker, podcast host, gamer, film critic
- M. Scott Peck, writer
- Amanda Peet, actress
- Liev Schreiber, actor
- Kyra Sedgwick, actress
- Katharine Lamb Tait, artist
- Olivia Thirlby, actress
- Vera Wang, designer
- William L. Ward, US Representative from New York's 16th district (1897-1899)
- Calvert Watkins, linguist and classicist
- Nat Wolff, actor
