= Emily Wakeman Hartley =

American actress (1872–1935)

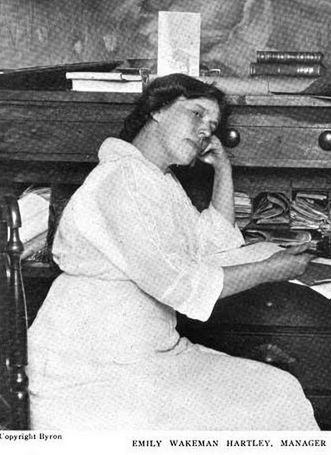
Emily Wakeman Hartley at her desk, from a 1914 publication.

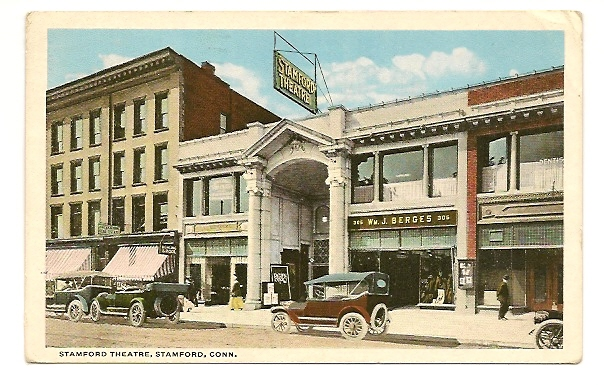
A postcard featuring the Stamford Theatre, from 1919

Emily Wakeman Hartley (1872 – February 20, 1935) was an American actress and theatrical manager, founder of the Stamford Theatre in Stamford, Connecticut.

== Early life ==
Emily I. Wakeman was born in New York, the daughter of Thaddeus B. Wakeman and Emily Ludlam Wakeman. Her father was a lawyer and writer interested in philosophy. Her mother was a clubwoman, active in working for women's suffrage. Emily Wakeman attended Friends Seminary and the American Academy of Dramatic Arts.

== Career ==
Emily Wakeman was an actress as a young woman, usually playing comic or character roles, including Broadway appearances in Caleb West (1900), Lover's Lane (1901), Marta of the Lowlands (1903), A Case of Frenzied Finance (1905), The Firm of Cunningham (1905), The House of Mirth (1906), The Three Daughters of Monsieur Dupont (1910), and The Runaway (1911).

Emily Wakeman Hartley was the founder, fundraiser, and manager of the Stamford Theatre, which opened in 1914. It became a popular venue for touring performers and for new shows, before they debuted in New York. She also lectured on creativity, saying "One of the great faults of the present generation is that too few make use of their gray matter; I mean that they do not seem to realize that they have something within themselves, and do not need to depend wholly upon outside matters for amusement. And a person who always has to be amused or entertained cannot be happy, for he hasn't the creative spirit."

Emily Wakeman Hartley ran unsuccessfully for the Connecticut state senate in 1922. She retired from managing the theatre in 1927.

== Personal life and legacy ==
In 1902, Emily Wakeman married Randolph Hartley, a librettist, publicist, and opera critic; his grandfather was poet and editor Rufus Wilmot Griswold. They had a son, Randolph Wakeman Hartley (born in 1909, when Emily was 37 years old). They lived in Cos Cob, Connecticut. Emily Wakeman Hartley was widowed in 1931 and died in 1935, from a heart attack, aged 62 years.

In 1987, an Emily Wakeman Hartley Theater Series began in Stamford, named in her memory.
