= Timothy Foote =

British writer (1926–2015)

- Born: 3 May 1926; London, England
- Died: 21 December 2015 (aged 89); Beaver Kill, New York, US
- Occupations: Editor, writer
- Spouse: Audrey Foote

Timothy Foote (3 May 1926 – 21 December 2015) was an English-born American editor and writer.

== Biography ==
Born 3 May 1926, in London, he was educated at Friends Seminary in New York, and graduated from Harvard in 1949, Summa Cum Laude and a member of Phi Beta Kappa. During World War Two, he interrupted his education to work as a radio operator on an aircraft carrier in the Pacific.

He was the author of two books, The World of Bruegel (1968) and The Great Ringtail Garbage Caper (1980) and several hundred articles and reviews on a wide range of subjects, variously published in TIME, where he was a senior editor for 14 years, The New York Times Sunday Book Review, Washington Post Book World, Esquire, The American Scholar and Smithsonian Magazine.

His best-selling work is The World of Bruegel which deals with the life and work of Pieter Bruegel the elder, seen in the religious, artistic and historic context of 16th-century Europe, especially the Low Countries. The Great Ringtail Garbage Caper (1980) is a book for children of all ages. It tells of a group of raccoons who organize a hijacking plan when their regular food supply is put under threat by new, younger, more efficient garbage collectors. This was turned into a cartoon with the help of Hanna-Barbera as an episode of CBS Storybreak, but thus far has not yet made it to release on DVD/Video formats.

After retiring, Foote continued to write and was a contributor to The American Scholar. In the Autumn 2005 edition, Foote wrote about his reporting in Israel and Lourdes with LIFE photographer Alfred Eisenstaedt.

Foote died on 21 December 2015 in Beaverkill, New York. He had been suffering from mesothelioma.

== Bibliography ==
- Foote, Timothy (1968), The World of Bruegel c1525-1569 ASIN: B000H3Q89C
- Foote, Timothy (1980), The Great Ringtail Garbage Caper ISBN 978-0-590-40660-4
