= Francis A. Bartlett =

American dendrologist

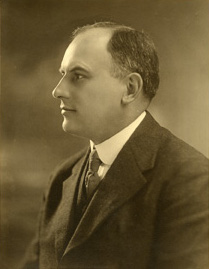

Francis Alonzo Bartlett (1882 – 1963), was an eminent American dendrologist.

== Biography ==
Bartlett graduated from Massachusetts Agricultural College (now the University of Massachusetts Amherst) in 1905, where he would later accept an honorary doctoral degree. He taught horticulture at the Hampton Institute in Virginia for two years before a benefactor of that college persuaded him to relocate to the New York area, where many valuable shade and ornamental trees were declining and dying at the time. Bartlett accepted the challenge by founding the Bartlett Tree Expert Company in 1907.

In 1913, Bartlett established the Bartlett Arboretum and Gardens at his residence in North Stamford, Connecticut for use as a training school for his company. By 1927, there was enough scientific work in progress to warrant the establishment of the Bartlett Tree Research Laboratories, located first in North Stamford, and, since 1965, on a large property in Charlotte, North Carolina. Bartlett was the first to use power spray equipment to manage landscape pests, and the first to develop practical cabling and bracing methods to reinforce structurally weak trees.
