= Stamford Museum & Nature Center =

Museum in Connecticut, US

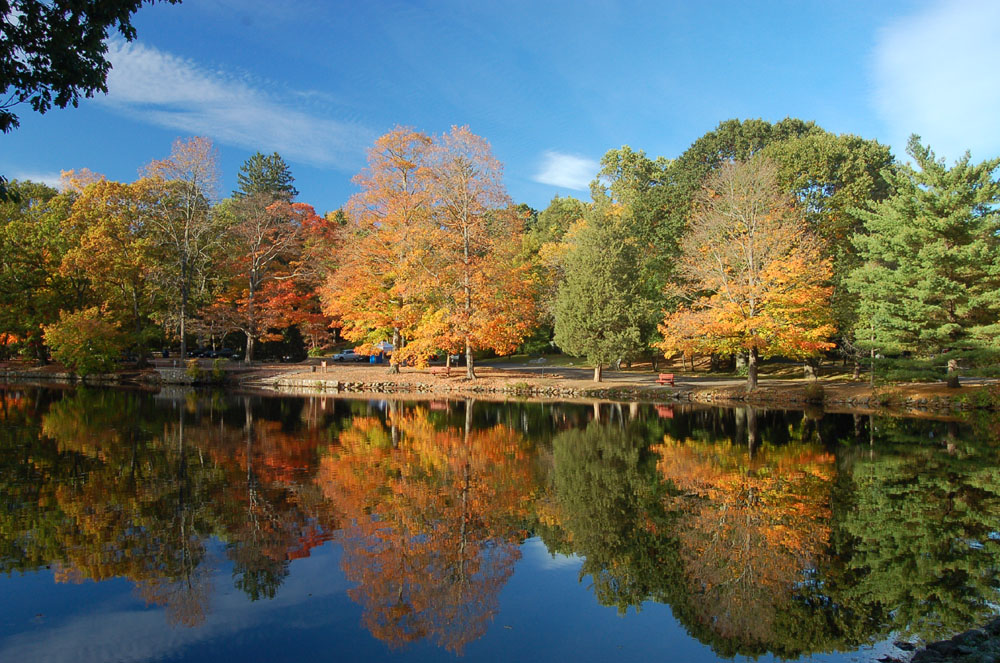
- Bendel Pond and Laurel Lake
- Founded: 1936
- Founder: Dr. G.R.R. Hertzberg
- Type: 501(c)(3) non-for profit organization
- Purpose: Art, Agricultural Science, Natural Science, History
- Location: Scofieldtown Road, Stamford, CT 06903-4023
- Coordinates: 41.126°N 73.547°W
- Website: stamfordmuseum.org
- Formerly called: Stamford Museum

The Stamford Museum & Nature Center, located in Stamford, Connecticut, is an art, history, nature, and agricultural sciences museum. The property covers 118 acres (c. 48 hectares) beginning about half a mile north of the Merritt Parkway. It was originally a private estate.

Located in the woods of North Stamford, Connecticut, the 118-acre museum property is home to a 10-acre working farm, a Tudor-style museum and gallery which hosts exhibitions, an interactive nature center, 80 acres of outdoor trails, a large planetarium, a 4-story observatory with a research telescope, an otter pond, and a large playground designed for children to experience animals' perspective on nature.

In addition to the facilities, the SM&NC offers seasonal family-oriented exhibits and weekend festivals, year-round childhood educational programming, camps, and volunteer opportunities.

== History ==
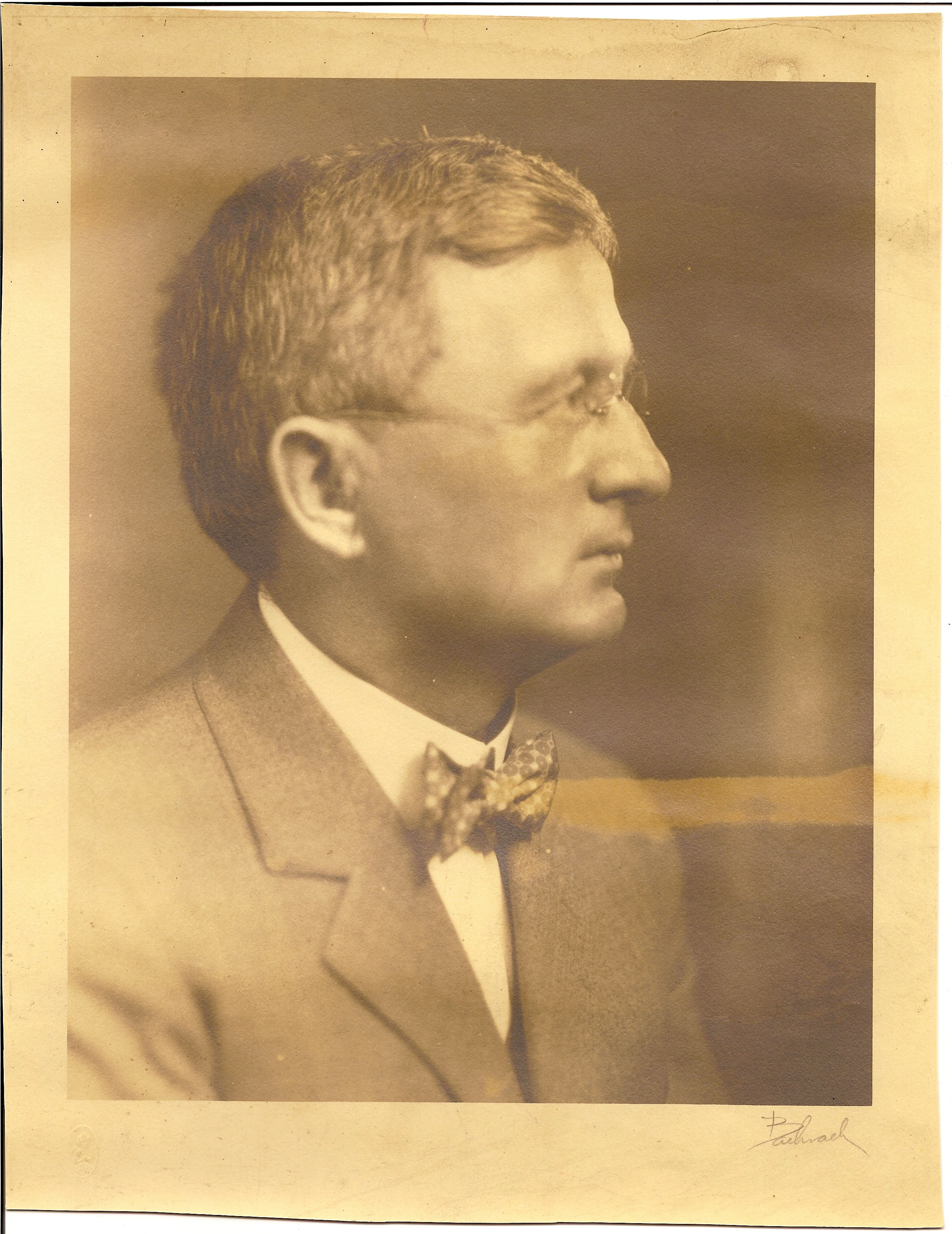
Dr. G.R.R. Hertzberg

In 1936, the museum's founders envisioned a safe and stimulating sanctuary where children and families could learn about the natural world, the agricultural sciences, astronomy, art, and history. Dr. G.R.R Hertzberg brought this philosophy to the first organizational meeting of the museum on January 20, 1936. The Stamford Museum was founded five months later, as a "cabinet of curiosities" model occupying three rooms at the Stamford Trust Company building at 300 Main Street. The original collection grew from community donations of birds, moths, butterflies, and other geological specimens. Opened to the public on June 27, 1936, this early incarnation of the museum drew families from the area, still its prime demographic today.

In 1938, the Hall of Mammals and the Hall of Geology & Mineralogy opened. In 1939, the museum was incorporated under a state charter which enabled it to receive public funds while still remaining autonomous. The Town and City of Stamford (there were two governments at that time) began contributing, and as the museum grew, so did the city and town's contributions. The same year, the Hoyt Marine Hall opened.

By 1945, the museum was quickly outgrowing its small downtown location. The E.Y. Webster Estate deeded eight acres to the city of Stamford, creating the museum's second location at Courtland Park. The former carriage house became the museum's new home, and a small barnyard and wildlife area were constructed. Local artists were showcased in the small gallery, and a planetarium and weather station were constructed and installed. Opening to the public in 1946, the Courtland Park location was short-lived, as the Connecticut Turnpike claimed six of the eight acres in Courtland Park in 1955. Once again, the burgeoning museum sought another, larger location.

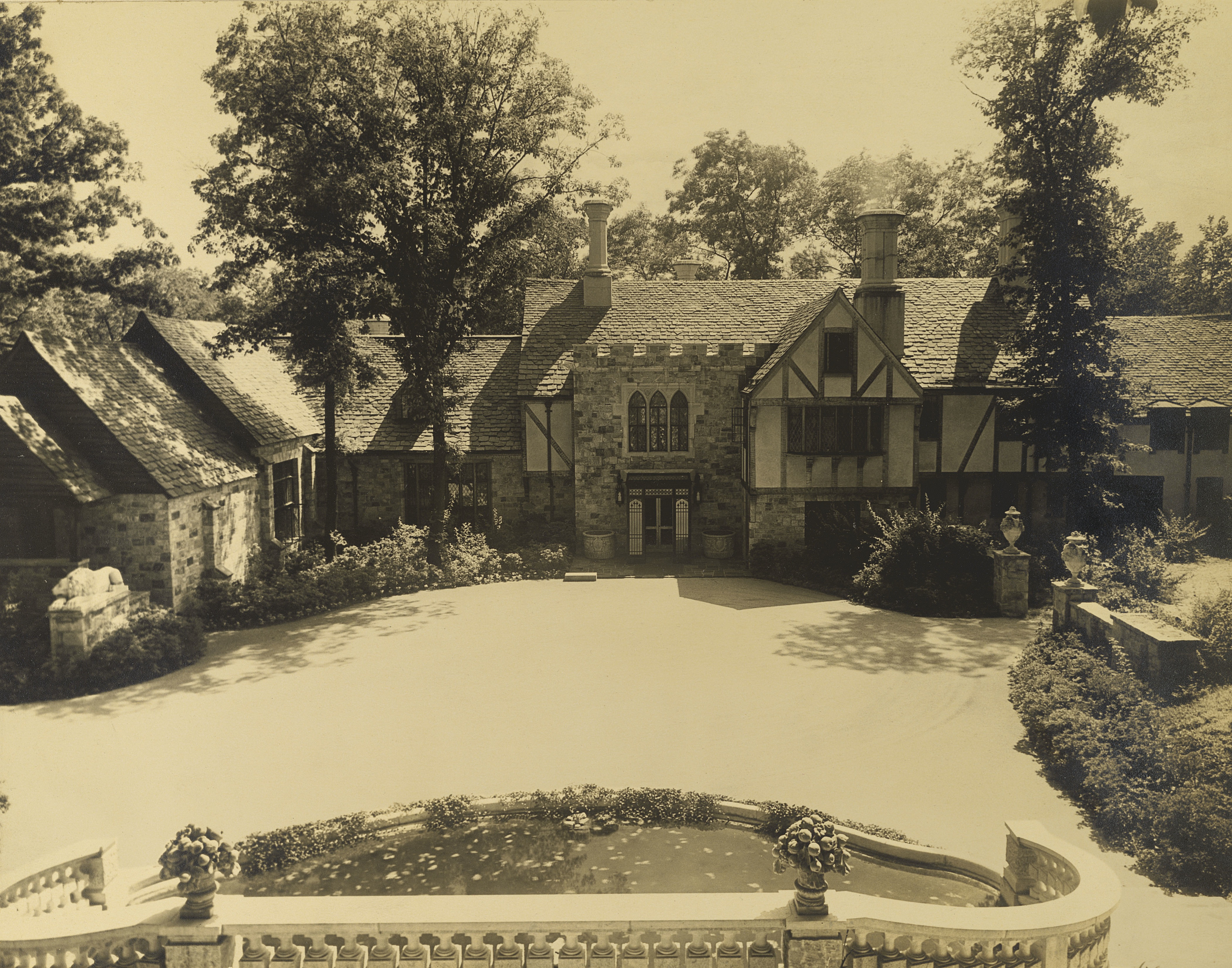
The early Museum

In 1955, the museum made its final move to the former Henri Bendel estate, where it continues to attract over 160,000 visitors each year. Henri Willis Bendel was a department-store pioneer and philanthropist who, with architect Perry Barker, built his dream castle in North Stamford in the late 1920s. After his death in 1936, the property passed through various hands for twenty years. In 1955 the estate was bequeathed to the Stamford Museum. The large, asymmetrical, 10,000 square-foot, neo-Tudor mansion Bendel used as a summer home anchored the large estate and provided ample space for the museum's early collections. "Nature Center" was added to the name of the non-profit as the Heckshire Farm for Children opened the same year.

Since then, the museum has grown considerably both in size and features. An additional sixteen acres of the bird sanctuary owned by the City of Stamford was made accessible. Another property of eight acres was donated by board member Benjamin D. Gilbert. A right of way of three acres, making the museum accessible to the Bartlett Arboretum trails, was donated by Mr. and Mrs. Dwight Marshall. In 1980, eleven acres abutting these properties was purchased by the City of Stamford, with the museum having permanent property rights, bringing its total property to 118 acres.

== Facilities ==
=== Bendel Mansion ===
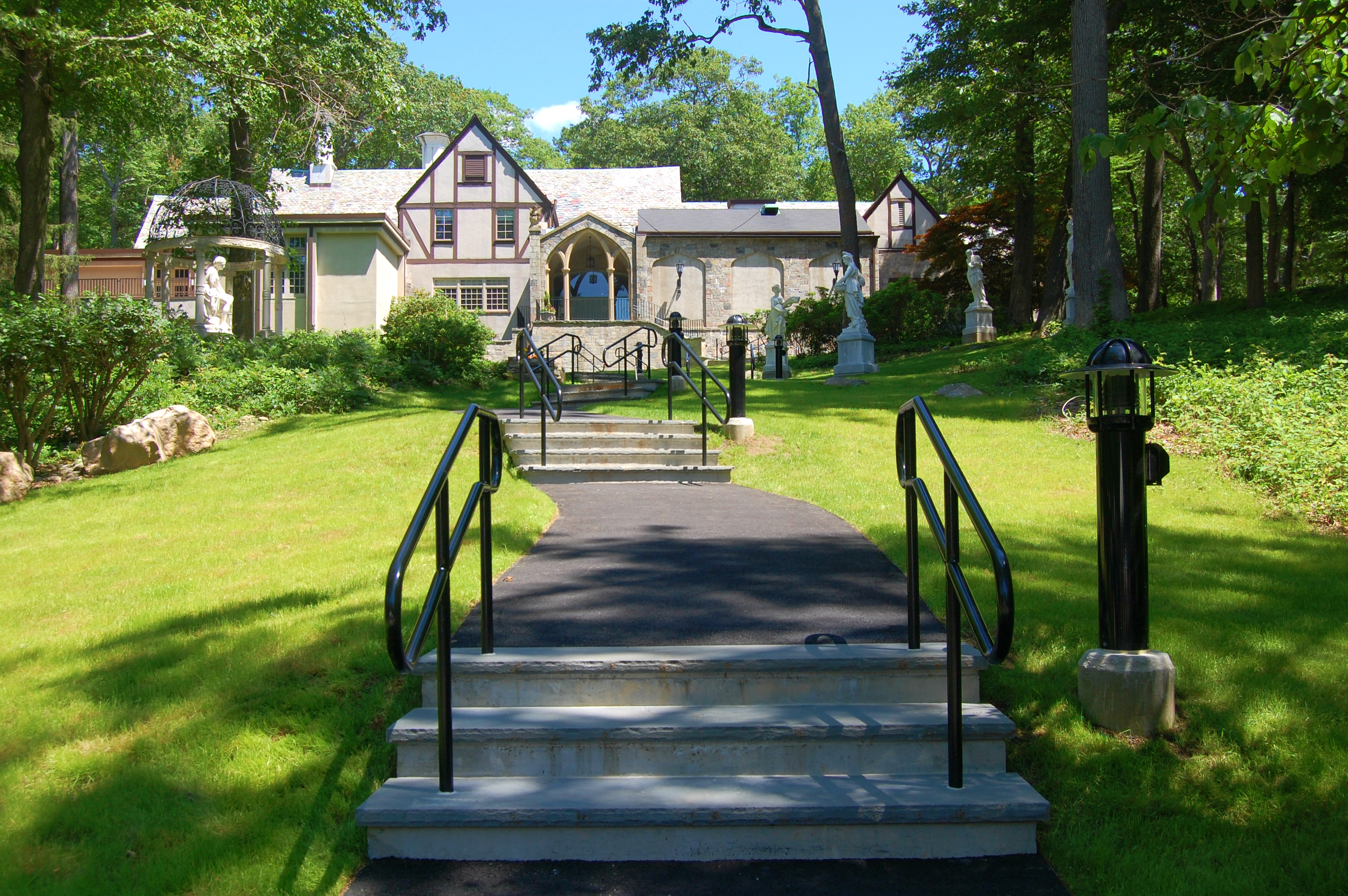
The Henri Bendel Mansion

Built in the late 1920s by architect Perry Barker, the Bendel Mansion was Henri Willis Bendel's homage to the classical elegance of a British manor house. Using two Tudor mansions located in Maidenhead, England, as inspiration, Barker built the epitome of the American "castle" of the time for his client. The house is on a hill overlooking the lake and has lead-framed glass windows, half-timbered walls, gargoyles, arching staircases, slate roofs, and multiple chimneys. Today, the Bendel Mansion functions as a gallery and museum space and is open to the public.

==== Museum displays ====
Art education at SM&NC stretches back to its days at Courtland Park where local artists were exhibited. Art classes for all ages were introduced. The move to the Bendel Estate attracted more donors who helped build the museum's current collection, starting with the 1956 gift of a John Singer Sargent portrait and the 1961 donation of the Schulman twentieth-century American art collection. In June 1973, an enlarged and modernized art gallery opened in the main building, allowing for the growth of permanent collections as well as exhibitions featuring selections from collections, as well as works from local art organizations.

Today, the museum focuses on five main areas: the natural history of New England, American art, Native American art and culture, American history and culture, and farming implements. Notable items in the SM&NC permanent collections include totem poles from a World's fair, telescopes, outdoor sculptures, farm tools, Native American artifacts, Andy Warhol and Salvador Dalí prints, vintage local pedal cars, antique Yale & Towne keys and locks, and works by Stamford artists Gutzon Borglum and Reuben Nakian.

=== Heckscher Farm ===
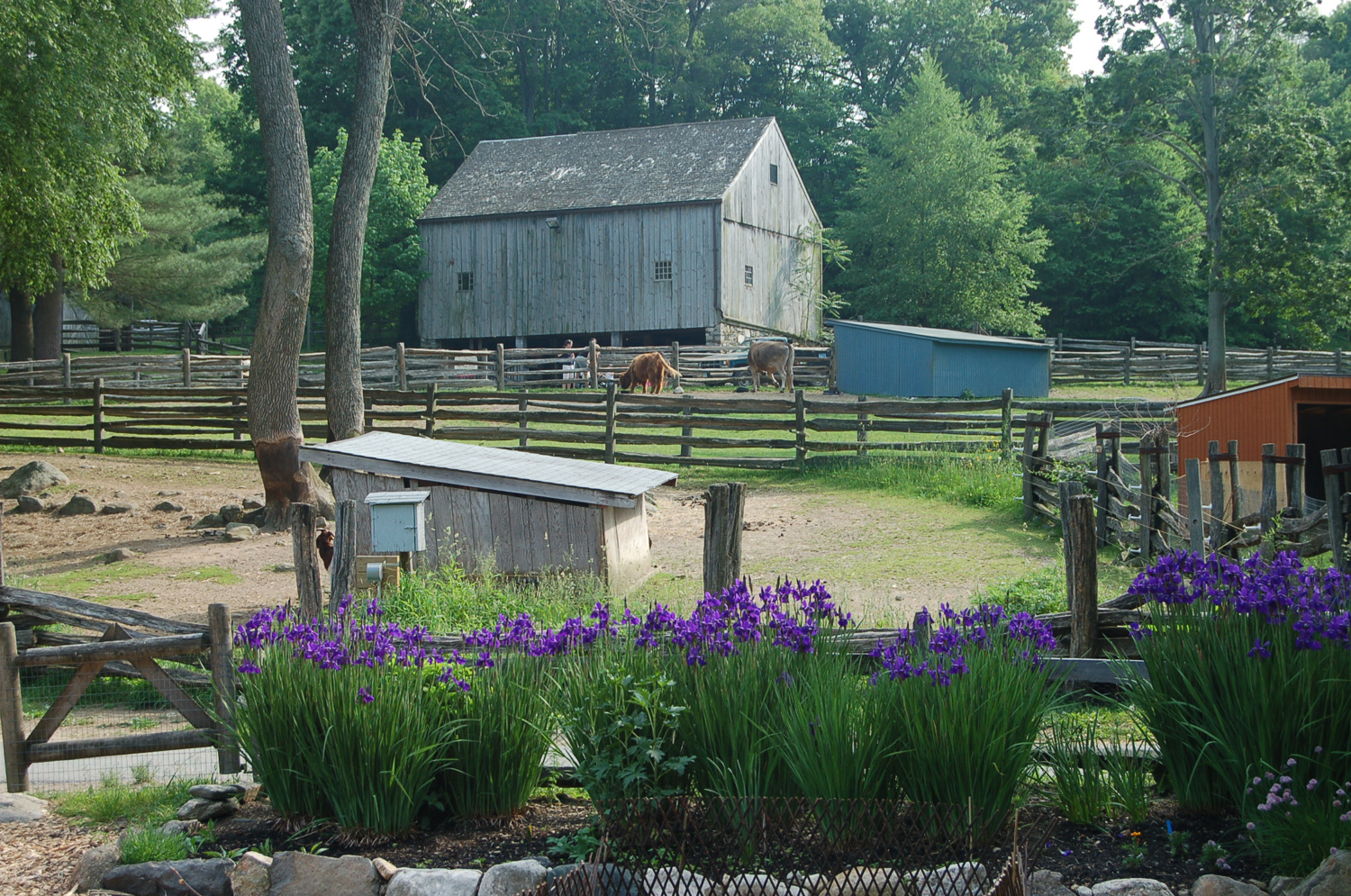
Hecksher Farm

The Heckscher Farm is a 10-acre (40,000 m^{2}) working farm which references New England's rural heritage through recreational and educational activities. Its pastoral backdrop is dotted with barns, a maple sugar house, organic vegetable garden, open pastures, and dozens of farm animals. Since its first grant in 1955 from the Heckscher Foundation for Children Grant, the farm has grown from a small dairy farm to include a chicken coop, pig pen, larger pastures, shelters, and many heritage breeds of farm animals including non-indigenous llamas, alpacas, and burros. Visitors are encouraged to experience rural life by observing the wildlife and staff who carry out daily chores to keep the farm running smoothly.

==== Farm history ====
Farm and wildlife were introduced to SM&NC while still at its Courtland Park location. A small farmyard containing a miniature barn was home to a lamb, a young goat, bantams, a hen and rooster, and numerous rabbits. Many orphaned or injured animals were brought to the museum where they were cared for by Junior Curators, a group of students who were studying in the nature and wildlife conservation classes. Before long, they developed a small wildlife area including an American bald eagle, a golden eagle, a fox, opossum, skunks, squirrels, and woodchucks. The Junior Curators program still exists at the SM&NC.

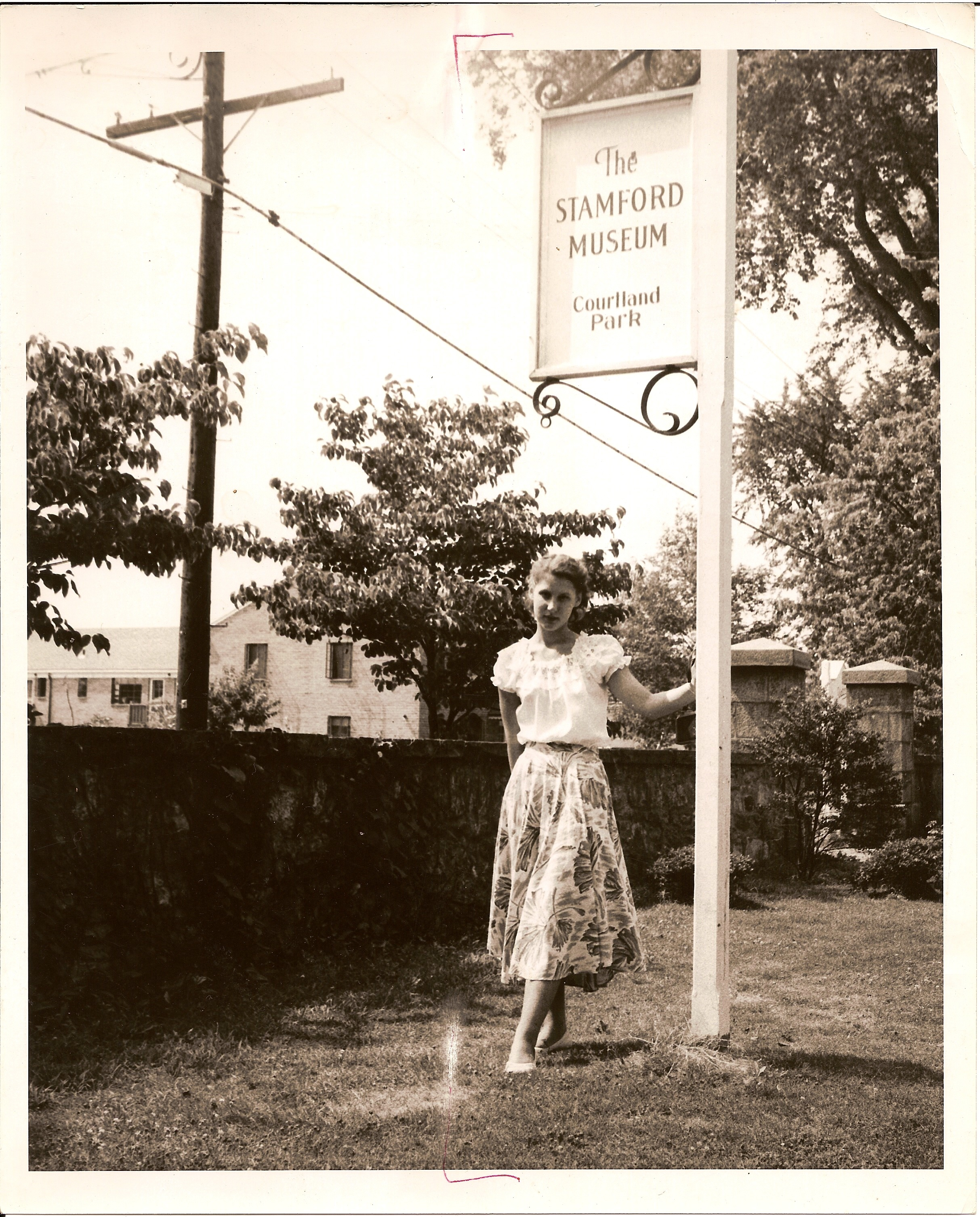
The Museum at Courtland Park

The move to the Museum's Scofieldtown Road location in 1955 brought with it the opportunity to build a larger model farmyard and barn which could accommodate more wildlife. A donation from the Hecksher Foundation for Children funded the building of the red barn and silo which became familiar to thousands of visitors. Over the next 20 years, the Hecksher Farm expanded to include wildlife exhibits including foxes, porcupines, a sheep shelter, chicken coop, raccoons, woodchucks, and birds of prey, as well as a medical facility to ensure proper care of the animals.

In the spring of 1977, the Board of Directors introduced a new initiative to create a period farm typical of those in Southern New England during the 19th century. The City of Stamford was quickly turning from a quiet suburban community into a corporate center. Small farms in the area were rapidly disappearing as industry and housing gobbled up the land.

Over the next five years, projects developed at a rapid pace. Land was cleared to create pastures, colonial fencing was installed, and a magnificent historic Cheshire barn, circa 1750, was moved from Cheshire, Connecticut and reassembled at the farm on a hand-laid stone foundation. The farm became home to animals typical of the era and area: oxen, sheep, cows, pigs, goats, and chickens now roam the farm.

=== Overbrook Nature Center and trails ===
The Overbrook Nature Center is the focal point of the SM&NC's nature and educational programs. It contains an interactive exhibit area with small local animals and "Nature's Classroom", a classroom for young student groups. Behind the Overbrook building are miles of walking trails.

Winding through 80 acres of the museum's property, the trails are diverse and abundant with wildlife. Teeming vernal pools, glacial erratic boulders, mature forests, and maintained woodland meadows are found throughout the area. The trails connect with the 88-acre Bartlett Arboretum on the north end of the museum's property.

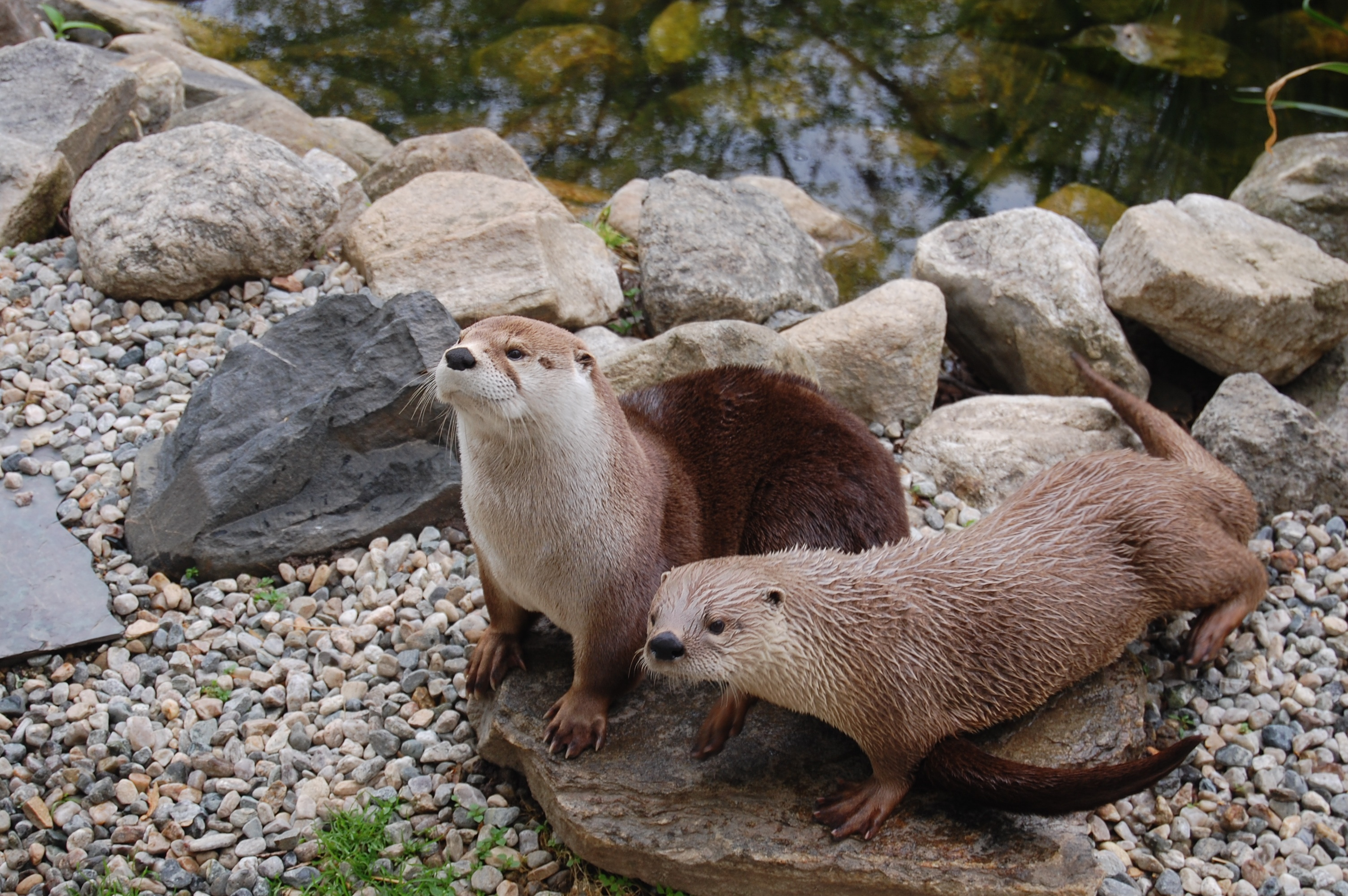
Otters Edie and Bert

In 2006, the universally-accessible Wheels in the Woods Trail #7 was added along Poorhouse Brook, allowing handicap access to the SM&NC trails.

=== Edith and Robert Graham Otter Pond ===
The Edith and Robert Graham Otter Pond is the home of the SM&NC's resident river otters. In May 2023, Ron the otter joined Sadie after Bert's passing a couple months prior.

=== Observatory and Planetarium ===
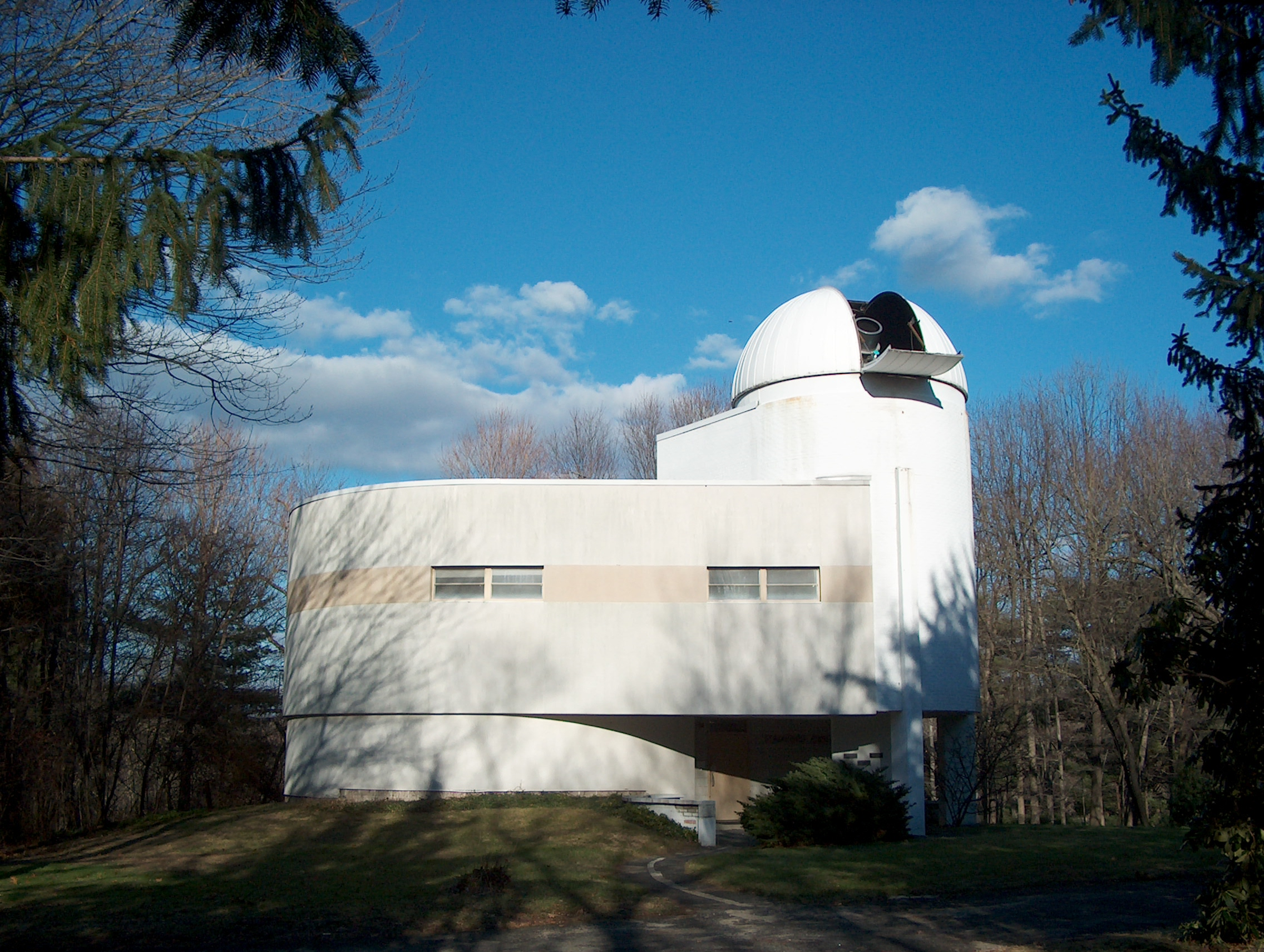
SM&NC's Observatory

The Stamford Museum & Nature Center has a four-story observatory which houses a 22-inch (560 mm) reflecting telescope and is used for research (primarily of binary star systems) by the Fairfield County Astronomical Society (FCAS). The observatory is currently closed to the public and the SM&NC is currently in the middle of a capital campaign to raise money for a new Astronomy & Physical Science Center.

The Museum's astronomical history began in 1941 when the Fairfield County Astronomical Society was formed. Members would bring their telescopes and set them up on the steps of the old Town Hall. In Courtland Park, a planetarium was constructed in one end of the lecture hall by building a dome which could be raised and lowered for planetarium shows.

This was one of the first Armand Spitz planetariums. Concerned that the only planetariums then available were so expensive that few institutions could have them and few people would live near enough to visit, in 1947 Spitz completed design work on a very inexpensive planetarium model. The main problem, he discovered, was that creating a globe for stellar projection was very complex and expensive. Following a suggestion by Albert Einstein, Spitz used a dodecahedron as the "globe" equivalent for his star projector.

Following a demonstration at an astronomical conference at the Harvard–Smithsonian Center for Astrophysics, Spitz received considerable publicity, and began marketing his Model A planetarium for $500. These were sold to the various American military academies, small museums, schools, and even to King Farouk of Egypt.

Within a few years, Spitz introduced the model A-1, which incorporated the Sun, Moon, and five naked eye planets, still using the dodecahedron shape for the star projector. Later a model A-2 came out, projecting more stars (the model A only gave stars brighter than magnitude 4.3). At present no record has been found establishing which model SM&NC purchased.

After moving to Scofieldtown Road, an open courtyard of the main building was enclosed to build the new planetarium.

Mr. and Mrs. Frank Altschul contributed the funds to construct an observatory on the property, which was completed in 1960. Materials were donated by local corporations, and the telescope was built by volunteers and the Fairfield County Astronomical Society. The largest telescope in the East available for public viewing was dedicated on June 13, 1965.

Heckscher WILD! Live Exotic Animal Exhibit In March 2015, the SM&NC opened Heckscher WILD!, a live animal exhibit that features non-releasable animals from all over the world in four ecosystems—grasslands, rainforest, mountains, and desert.

== Events and offerings ==
=== Annual events ===
==== Harvest Fest Sundays ====
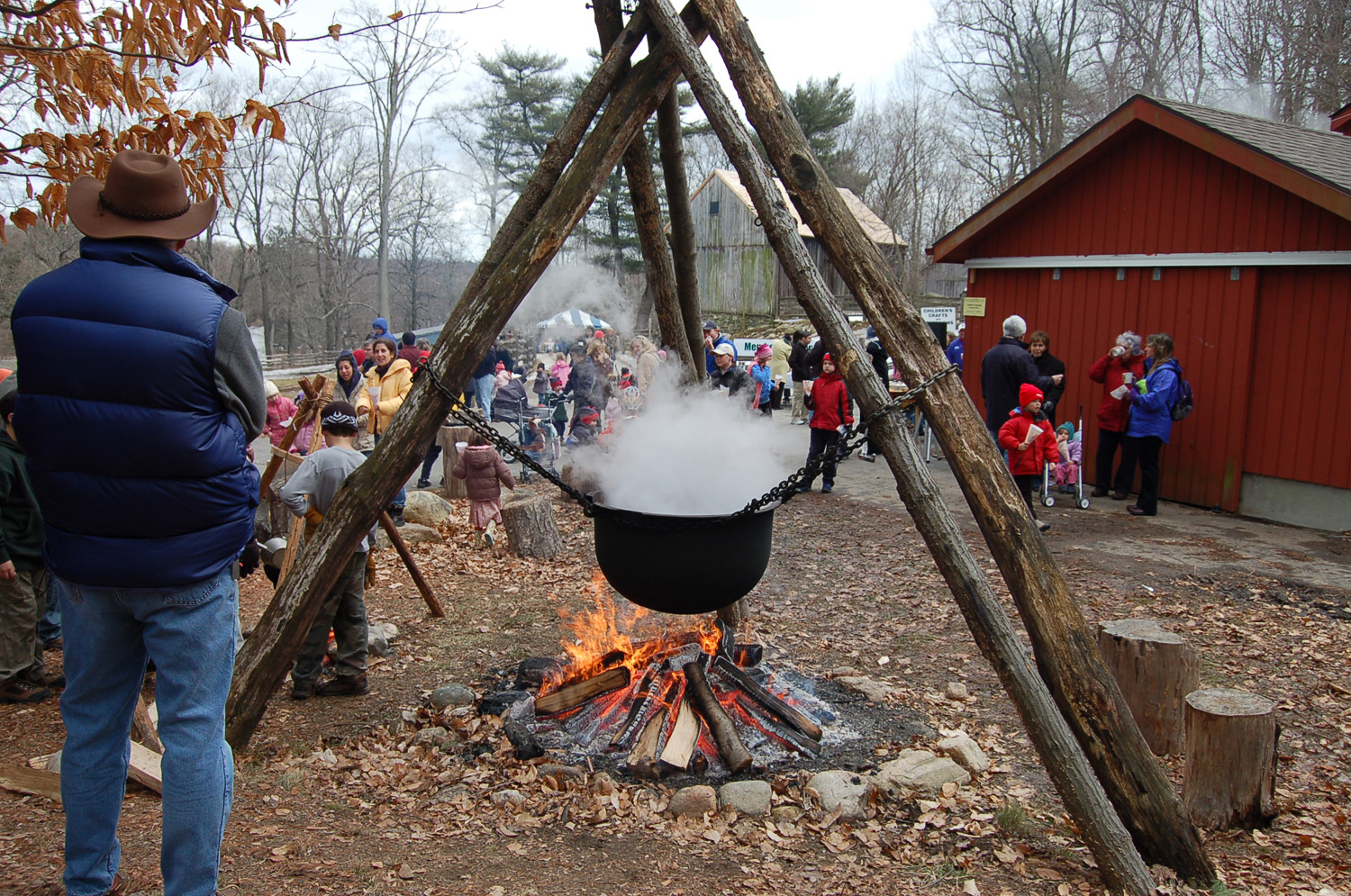
Maple Sugar Festival Weekend

Each fall, the Stamford Museum & Nature Center hosts its annual Harvest Fest Sundays, focused on seasonal activities including apple cider demonstrations, hayrides, apple slingshots, pumpkin carving, farm animal demonstrations, face painting, storytelling, crafts, a costume parade, and more.

==== Maple Sugar Fest Sundays ====
Each late winter, the SM&NC revives the New England pastime of maple sugaring during the Maple Sugar Fest Sundays. At the Hecksher Farm sugarhouse, one can view tree tapping, sap collecting, and taste the sweet maple sugar that ushers in the annual agricultural awakening. Other offerings include scavenger hunts, storytellers, face painting, maple-themed crafts, pancake brunch, and a Chef's Cook-off Challenge.

==== Annual fundraiser ====
Their biggest fundraiser of the year had, for many years, been the annual wine tasting and silent auction which paid tribute to Stamford Museum & Nature Center's history within its community. The June event consisted of wine tastings, samplings of food from local restaurants and caterers and a silent auction. In 2019, the SM&NC launched "An Evening With", an annual fundraiser. The inaugural event was held in May 2019.

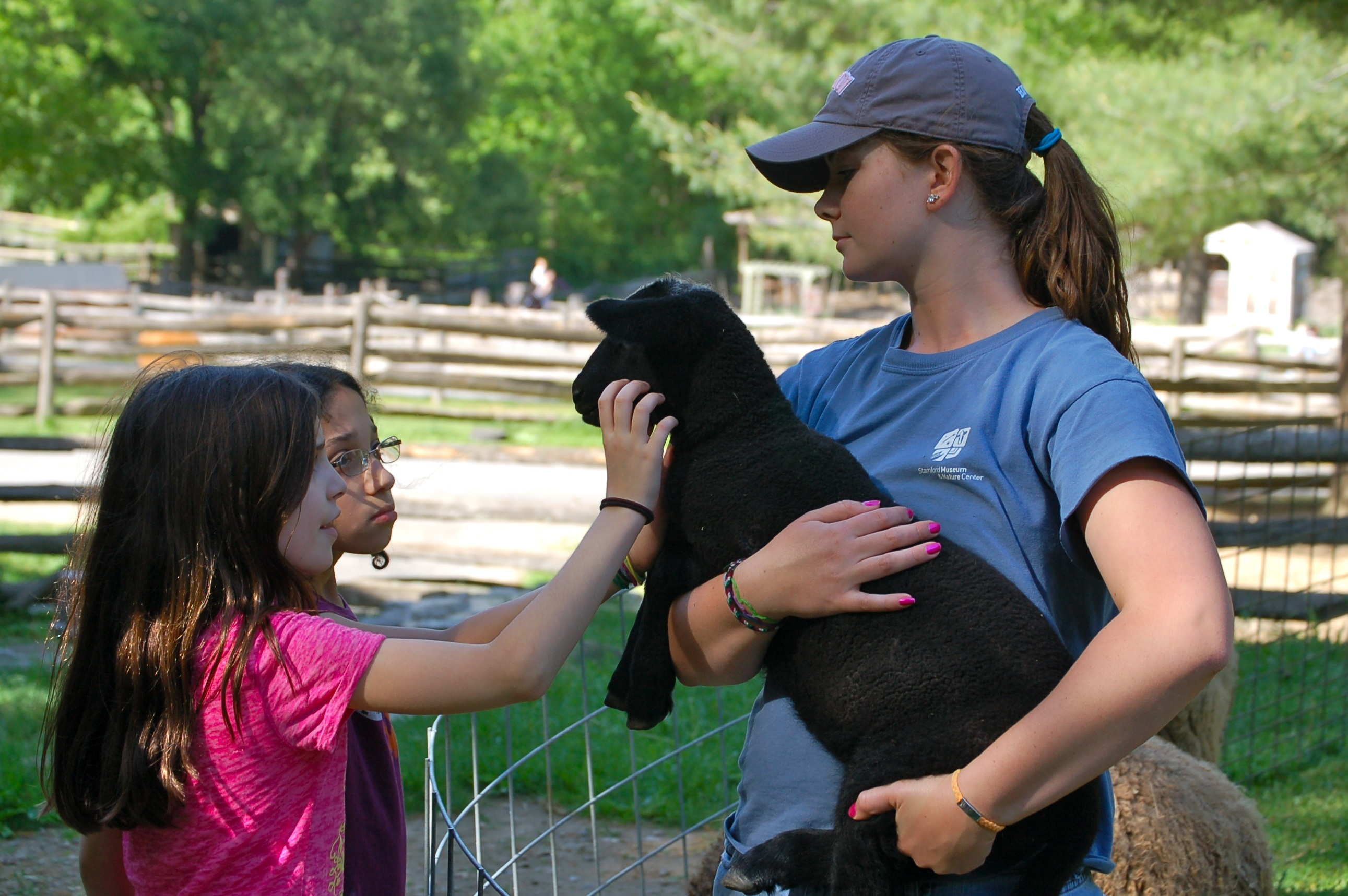
Spring on the Farm Festival Weekend

==== Spring on the Farm Fests ====
Stamford Museum & Nature Center hosts its family-oriented Spring on the Farm Fests Sundays in May.

==== Model T's to Mustangs Antique & Classic Car Show ====
Each spring the Stamford Museum & Nature Center hosts its antique classic and classic car show featuring automobiles of all makes and models, US as well as imports, manufactured between 1900 and 1979. The annual event features a special "focus group" dedicated to a specific brand of car. The SM&NC ended the Model T's event after the 20th iteration.

=== Past exhibitions and events ===
- 1942 – wartime exhibition Camouflage in Nature and its Uses in the Military
- 1944 – Museum's first Gutzon Borglum exhibition, the sculptor of Mount Rushmore
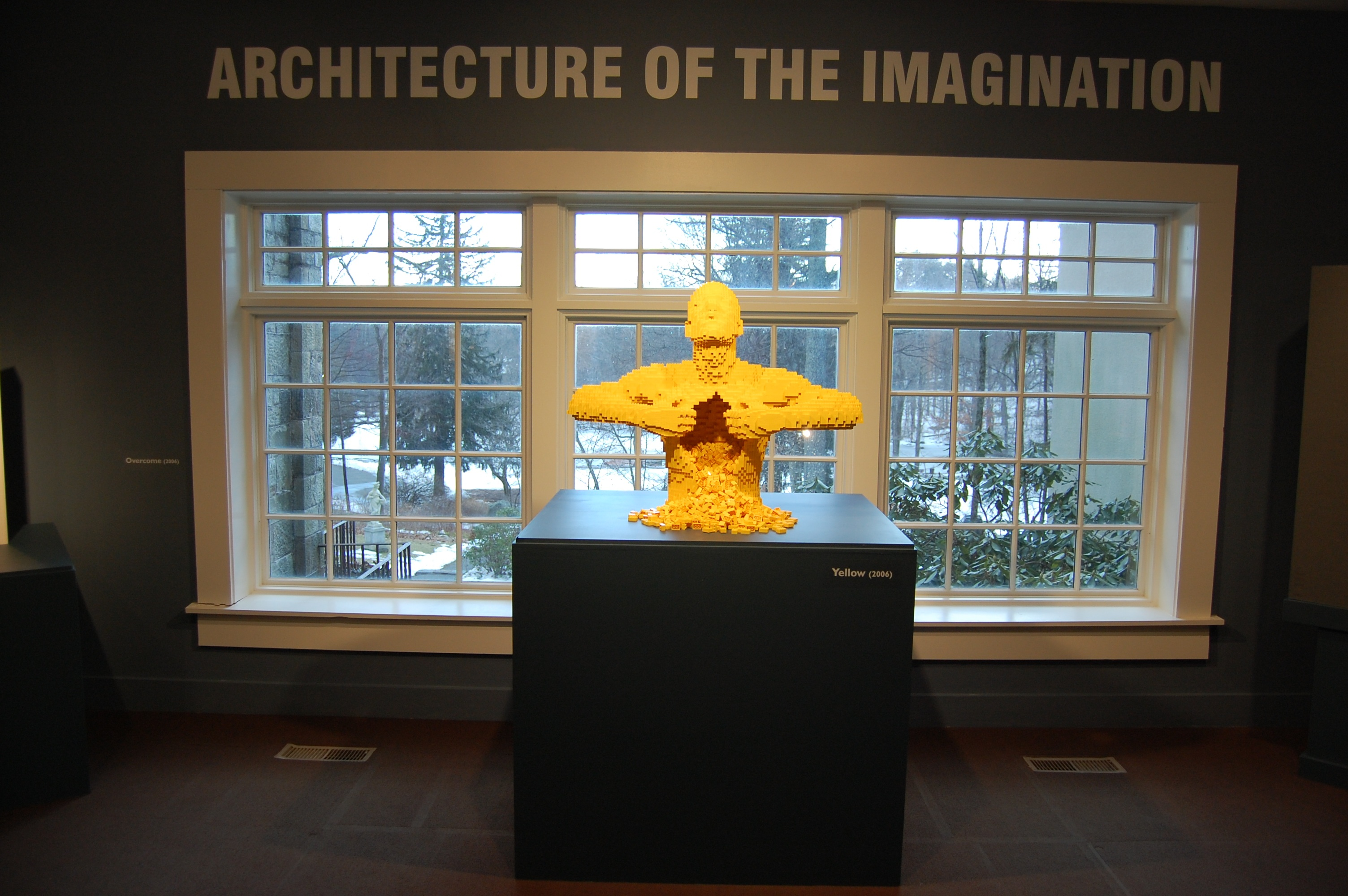
  Architecture of the Imagination: The Lure of the LEGO Brick exhibition
- 1971 – Open House Moon Rock on display
- 1973 – Henry Moore's Elephant Skull
- 1975 – Delacroix and the French Romantic Print
- 1976 – Mr. Audubon & Mr. Bien; Navaho Blankets; Salon des Refuses
- 1978 – NASA's Space Shuttle, Vintage Toys
- 1980 – 25 years on High Ridge; Toy Treasures, Permanent Collection
- 1994 – MAD Magazine; Ken Marchione, Elgiac Paintings
- 1997 – Ruben Nakian, Working the Image
- 2001 – Springs, Sprockets & Pulleys: The Mechanical Sculptures of Steve Gerberich; 50 Years of Beetle Bailey
- 2002 – Ukulele Fever: The Craze that Swept the Nation
- 2003 – Pedal to the Metal: A History of Children's Pedal Cars
- 2004 – From Goodnight Moon to Art Dog: The World of Clement, Edith and Thatcher Hurd
- 2005 – Creative Contraptions: Rube Goldberg and Goldberg-inspired art
- 2006 – Consuming Desires: Modern Marketing Posters, 1880–1918; Built to Scale: Auto, Plane & Boat Model Masterpieces
- 2008 – Architecture of the Imagination: The Lure of the LEGO Brick exhibition, showcasing the sculpture of Nathan Sawaya and Bill Probert's Trainscape, constructed with team of Stamford High School students, set record-breaking gallery attendance of 69,000 visitors
- 2009 – Rodin: In his Own Words; Baseball's League of Nations: A Salute to Native American Baseball Players
- 2010 – Gerberich's Gadgetry; Robert Deyber, Turning a Phrase
- 2011 – Gather up the Fragments: The Andrew Shaker Collection; To The Moon: Snoopy Soars with NASA

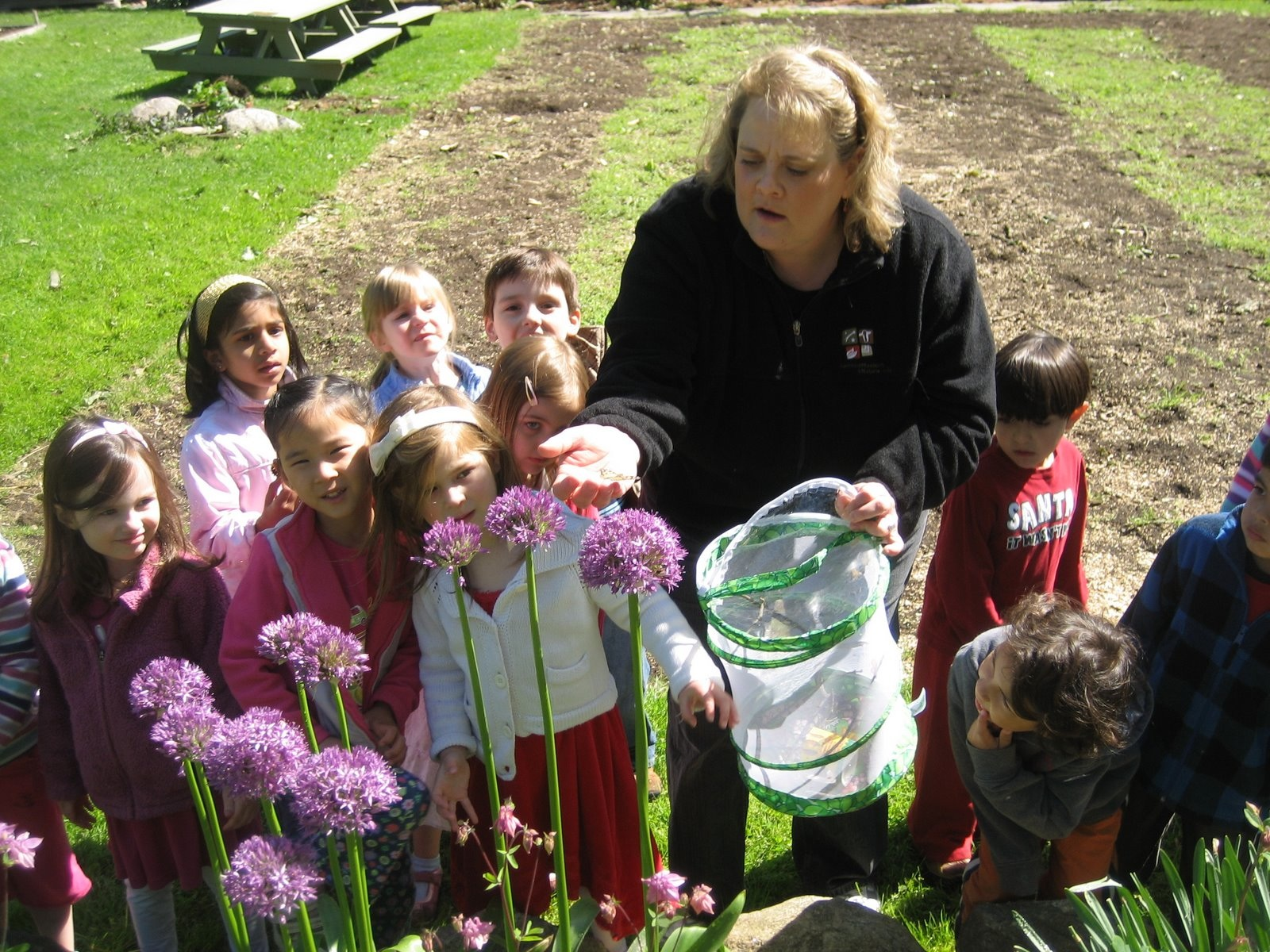
Art, Nature and Me Preschool

== Education ==
The Stamford Museum & Nature Center offers year-round classes and educational programs in art, nature, science, and agriculture, for children, families, and adults.
