= North Stamford =

- Neighborhood
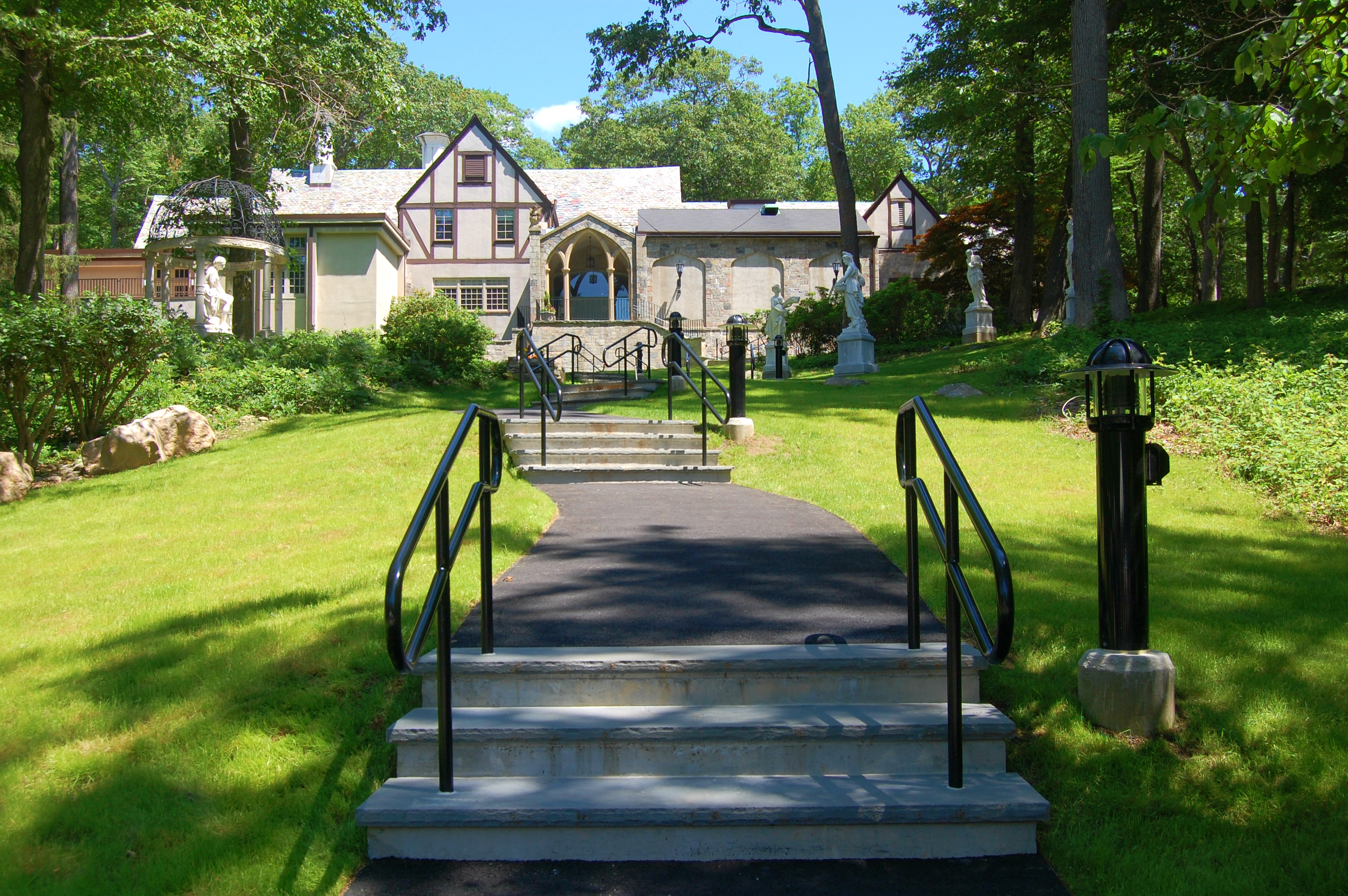
- Interactive map of North Stamford
- Country: United States
- State: Connecticut
- County: Fairfield
- City: Stamford

Population
  - Total: 14,904
- Time zone: UTC-5:00 (Eastern)
  - Summer (DST): UTC-4:00 (Eastern)
- Area codes: 203

North Stamford is an affluent section of Stamford, Connecticut, United States, north of the Merritt Parkway. Mostly woody and hilly, it is the least densely populated, and highest income section of the city, with a 2021 median household income in excess of $250,000. The two main roadways in North Stamford are High Ridge Road (Route 137) and Long Ridge Road (Route 104). North Stamford borders Pound Ridge, New York, at the New York line to the north, the "back country" section of Greenwich, Connecticut, to the west, and the Town of New Canaan, Connecticut, to the east. According to the 2010 census, North Stamford has a population of 14,904. The City of Stamford as a whole had a population of 135,470 (per the 2020 Census).

High Ridge Road, in the area just south of the Merrit Parkway, is the largest shopping district near North Stamford. A shopping plaza and some surrounding stores are also nearby on Newfield Avenue, and downtown Springdale also offers nearby stores.

Stamford's population began to grow during and after World War II with 30,000 new residents arrived from 1940 to 1960. "North Stamford developed with one- and two-acre zoning, looking just like Wilton or New Canaan," Janice Green, the manager of the William Pitt Real Estate office, told The New York Times in 1989. "Executives moved up there who had no connection with the factories and ethnic working-class neighborhoods downtown."

== Landmarks and institutions ==
Water reservoirs which provide water service to the City of Stamford are located in North Stamford, as are the Bartlett Arboretum and the Stamford Historical Society headquarters and museum.

Also in the neighborhood is the Stamford Museum and Nature Center, a 118-acre (0.48 km^{2}) facility on Scofieldtown Road. The museum works with schools in Stamford, Bridgeport, Norwalk, Darien and Greenwich, and more than 10,000 students visit every year. In 2007 the museum and nature center started working with Aquarion, a water utility serving much of Fairfield County, in a program meant to educate children about water ecology and watershed protection.

Buttonwood Manor, a Colonial-style house on an estate of 8 acres (32,000 m^{2}), is in North Stamford. The original main house was built by Jacob Stevens in 1809, then sold it in 1821 to Gould Raymond. For 77 years the Raymond family farmed the land. By 1926 Mary Stella Tisdale Atwood had bought the house from Otto Sarrach and began restoring it. She sold the estate to William E. Stevenson, a Gold Medal winner in the 1924 Summer Olympics in Paris (setting a new world record of 3:16.0 as member of the American 400-meter relay team) and later a president of Oberlin College. While Stevenson and his wife were in England running American Red Cross operations in World War II, they rented the house to Dorothy Fields, a lyricist.

Old Long Ridge Village, the neighborhood surrounding Long Ridge Village Historic District, includes historic churches, a local market, a century old tavern, and the volunteer Long Ridge Fire Company.

Tucker Hill, the former Hunting Ridge Methodist Church built in 1850, is on Hunting Ridge Rd, near Old Long Ridge Village. The former church was converted to a residence in 1968 by the family of renowned sculptor Robert Laurent.

== Transportation ==
The Merritt Parkway allows no commercial vehicles, trucks, buses, and vehicles over 8 feet because of the small lanes, and narrow bridges. The Merritt Parkway is 5 miles north of and runs parallel to I-95. The Merritt Parkway starts at the Greenwich border and ends at Milford. The Merritt changes its name to the Hutchinson River Parkway entering New York State with the Exit numbers continuing with a few breaks. The Parkway goes through Westchester County NY into New York City, the Bronx and continues to the Whitestone Bridge into Queens.

North Stamford has two routes: Route 104 and Route 137. Route 104 starts in Ridgeway and ends at Bedford, New York. Route 137 starts in the Downtown and ends at Pound Ridge, New York.

North Stamford is served by the New Canaan Branch of the Metro-North Railroad, with many residents opting to use the stations of New Canaan, Talmadge Hill, and Springdale.

There are also CTTransit Buses that run from the downtown to other parts of the city; North Stamford is served by CTTransit. The bus routes serving North Stamford are 336, 324, 331, and 331S.

== Parks ==
- Susan Nabel Park at Chestnut Hill - Chestnut Hill Road and Webbs Hill Road
- Dorothy Heroy Park - riding stable trail
- Scofieldtown Park - Scofieldtown Road
- Woodley Road Bird Sanctuary - off Scofieldtown Road
- Mianus River Park - Merribrook Lane
- Newman Mills Park - Riverbank Road

== Emergency services ==
Fire service in provided by a combination of volunteer and professional firefighters. Fire stations are Stamford Fire Department Company #8, 268 Turn of River Road (professional), Turn of River Fire Department #2, 50 Roxbury Road (volunteer), Long Ridge Fire Co., 366 Old Long Ridge Road (volunteer), and Long Ridge Fire Co. 2 2619 High Ridge Road (volunteer).

Police service is provided by the Stamford Police Department. The police substation serving North Stamford is at 1137 High Ridge Road.

Emergency medical service is provided by the Stamford Emergency Medical Services. The nearest EMS garage is at 684 Long Ridge Road.

== Secession movement of 1990s ==
The New York Times reported in 1995 that in the 1990s many North Stamford residents were seriously considering a secession movement to form a town separate from the City of Stamford. Many North Stamford residents calculated that creating their own town would significantly reduce property taxes. The Concerned Citizens of North Stamford argued that North Stamford residents pay nearly a third of Stamford's property taxes although they make up less than 15 percent of the city's population and in return receive less city services. North Stamford residents do not receive city garbage collection (as does most of the rest of the city), must provide their own water and sewerage systems, have less police protection and, largely, have their children bused to schools in other parts of town. The New York Times reported that in 1995, that Stamford's then Mayor Esposito strongly opposed the movement. Mayor Esposito cited a plan by the city to permit the conversion of the vacant Riverbank School into a 53-bed residential hospice along with offices for Hospice Care Inc as a strong reason against the movement. Although the Concerned Citizens of North Stamford received about 600 signatures in a petition for the secession movement, it ultimately failed because many North Stamford residents were opposed to the plan and were discouraged by the complex process of secession in the State of Connecticut. Secession would require a revision of the City charter and the approval of the State Legislature. It is unlikely the City of Stamford would allow the lucrative revenue stream of property taxes from North Stamford to cease and for State legislators to approve a major municipality separation without the City of Stamford's support. There is very little to no legitimate discussions on secession in our current day as North Stamford is seen as an established part of the City of Stamford legally and functionally. Secession movements also took place in 1990s in the Rowayton section of Norwalk, Connecticut, and the East Shore section of New Haven, Connecticut, with those residents citing similar concerns. All of these movements were unsuccessful and their neighborhoods remain within their larger cities jurisdiction.

== Historical cemeteries ==
North Stamford contains numerous old cemeteries from the nineteenth century and before, some quite small and often with gravestones bearing elaborate engravings and even poetry.

These old cemeteries are in North Stamford:

- June (1846–1866) — north side of Constance Road, in the woods

William S. June, 1846, age 25:

Dear young friends, as you pass by
As you are now so once was I
As I am now so you must be
Prepare for death & follow me

- Webbs Hill (1796–1878) — east of Webbs Hill Road, south of Jeffrey Lane
- Dean (1838–1891) — south side of Lolly Lane
- Seth Smith (1831–1846) — southeast corner of Riverbank Road and Riverbank Drive
- Ebenezer Smith (1835–1877) — west side of Riverbank Road
- Isaac Smith (1860) — west side of Riverbank Road
- Scofieldtown (1807–1932) — east side of Scofieldtown Road, north of Woodley Road
- Thaddeus Lockwood (1827–1851) — east side of Riverbank Road
- Hait (1807–1860) — west side of Riverbank Road, south of Farms Road
- Edwin R,. Lockwood (1857–1896) — east side of Hunting Ridge Road
- North Stamford (1776–1932) — east side of Lakeside Drive, north of reservoir
- Poorhouse (no dates) — east side of Scofieldtown Road, southeast of former University of Connecticut campus
- East Hunting Ridge (1830–1856) — northeast corner of East Hunting Ridge and Haviland roads
- Smith-Clason (1826–1849) — south side of Hunting Glen Road
- Brush (1760–1828) — west side of East Middle Patent Road
- Long Ridge Union (1796-"present" [at least 1980]) — south side of Erskine Road near Long Ridge Road
- High Ridge (1796-"present" [at least 1980]) — west side of High Ridge Road, opposite United Methodist Church

Mary E. Dann, 1861, age 26:

Dear husband and children and sisters, farewell
I go to the land of the blest
Where our parents and children dwell
Where soon we all may find rest.
Two bright little cherubs up there
Call out for their mother to come
Our mothers and children are there
Awaiting to welcome me home.
Then grieve not, dear loved ones, that I
Must leave this sad world and its woe
Tis to join with the loved ones on high
That I part with the loved ones below.

Hannah Jones Lockwood, 1842, age 4:

O Father dear, prepare to follow me
In Heaven your wife & sweet babes to see
Affliction sore this infant bare
Physicians aid was in vain
Till God did please to call her home
And freed her from her pain.

Oren S. Palmer, 1865, age 1:

Two more little hands
Close folded on the breast
One more little form
Is gently laid to rest.

== Notable people ==
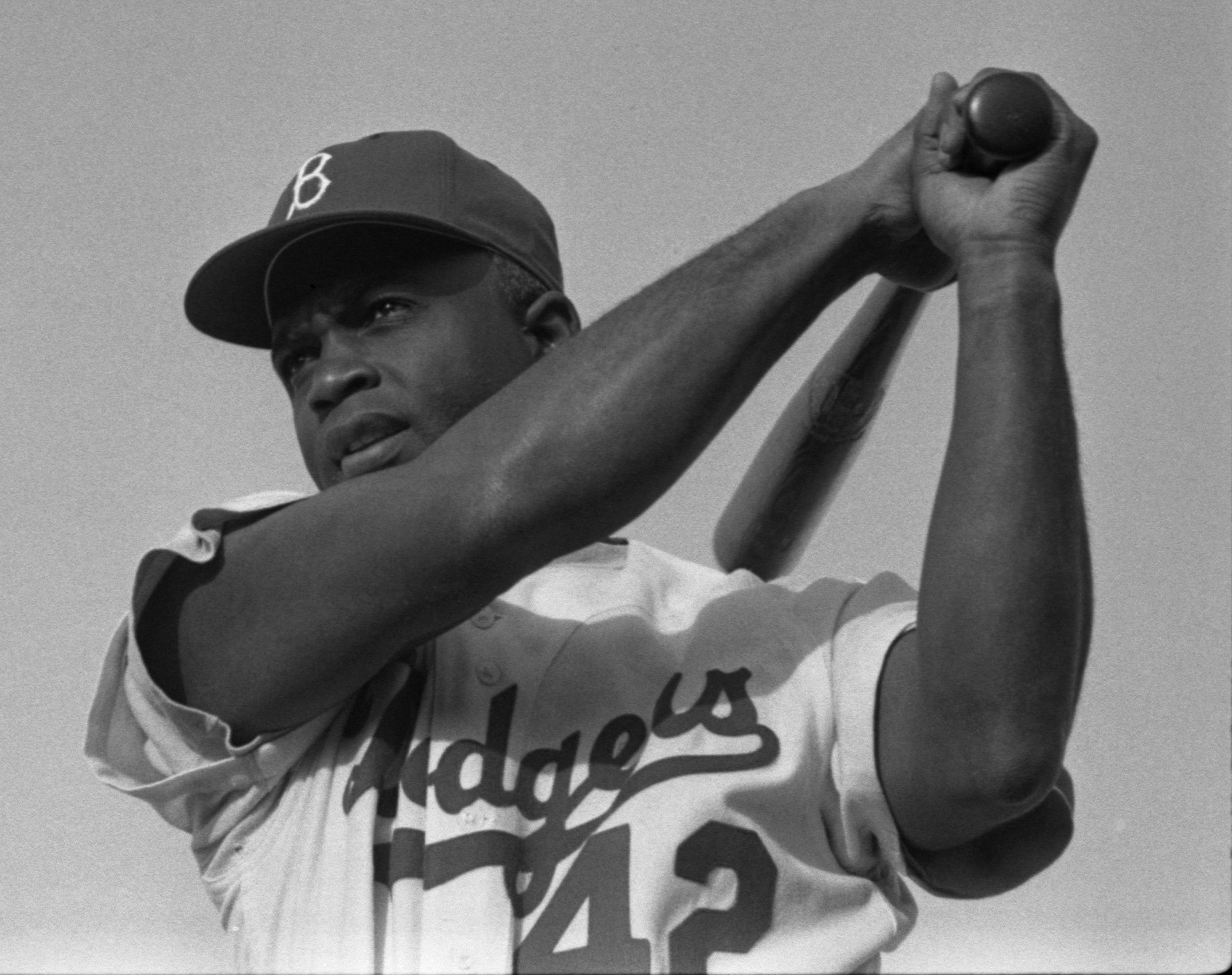
Jackie Robinson in his now-retired number 42 jersey.

- Henri Willis Bendel had an estate in North Stamford, see Stamford Museum and Nature Center.
- Michael Bolton, singer, lived in North Stamford (as of 1998) before moving to Westport.
- Gutzon Borglum, sculptor of Mount Rushmore, lived in North Stamford from 1910 to 1920.
- Ernie Bushmiller, American cartoonist, best known for creating Nancy (comic strip), lived in North Stamford from 1950 to 1985.
- The Chambers Brothers, psychedelic soul, recorded Time Has Come Today. with drummer Brian Keenan, were the second black family to integrate North Stamford
- Dorothy Fields, lyricist, rented Buttonwood Manor from William E. Stevens during World War II.
- Benny Goodman, jazz and swing musician lived in North Stamford.
- Harry Houdini, magician and escape artist, had a home on Webbs Hill Road.
- Cyndi Lauper, singer, has (or had, as of 1998) a home in North Stamford.
- Ezio Pinza, a star of the Metropolitan Opera, was a resident of North Stamford.
- Alex Raymond, creator of the Flash Gordon comic strip, lived in North Stamford.
- Jackie Robinson, the first African-American baseball player in the modern Major Leagues, made North Stamford his home later in his life. One of the several Stamford Little League Baseball leagues is named after him.
- Chuck Scarborough, news presenter for WNBC-TV Channel 4 in New York City, has a home here.
- Stephen Sondheim lived in North Stamford when he was a boy.
- William E. Stevenson, 1924 Olympic Gold Medal winner in track, president of Oberlin College, bought Buttonwood Manor in 1937.
- Bobby Valentine, former manager of the New York Mets and Boston Red Sox, has a home in North Stamford.
- Gene Wilder, actor, was a resident before dying in August 2016.
- Travis the Chimp lived in North Stamford before being shot and killed by police after going on a rampage and assaulting a friend of his owner.
- Carly Simon's parents owned the estate which is now a private school campus on Newfield Avenue.
- Michael Lee Aday aka rockstar Meat Loaf lived on Eagle Drive in the late 1970s and early 1980s. He coached local little league baseball during that period.
- Vivian Vance, actress was a resident from 1961 to 1974.
- Gilda Radner, comedian, actress.
- John Starks, Former NBA player.
- Chris Noth, actor grew up in North Stamford
- Gene Tunney, heavyweight boxing champion owned and resided on Star Meadow Farm on Erskine Road after his retirement
