= Bartlett Arboretum and Gardens =

Place in Stamford, Connecticut, U.S.

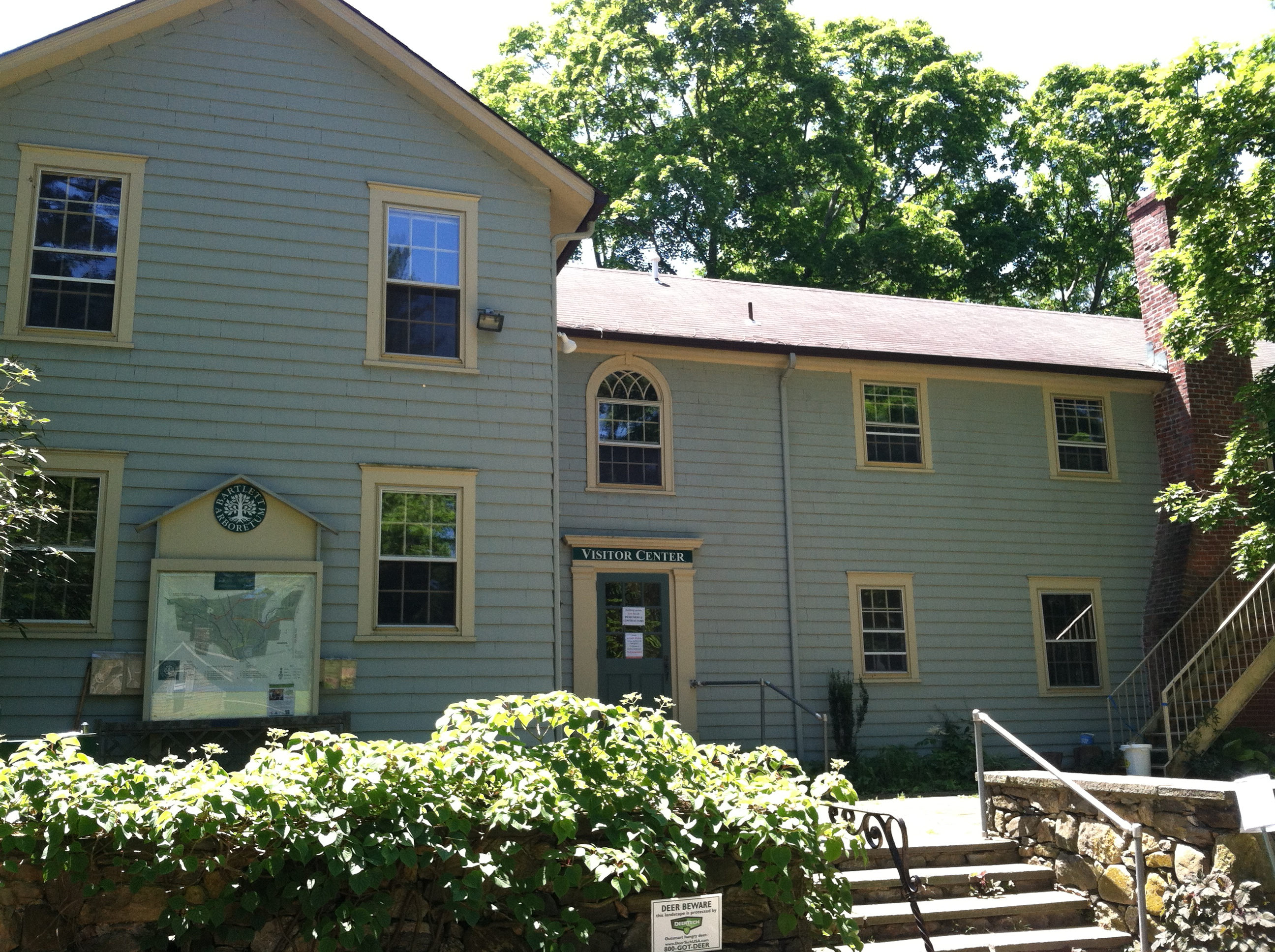
- Bartlett Homestead
- Interactive map of Bartlett Arboretum and Gardens
- Type: Arboretum
- Location: Stamford, Connecticut
- Coordinates: 41.1335°N 73.547°W
- Area: 93 acres (38 ha)
- Website: www.bartlettarboretum.org

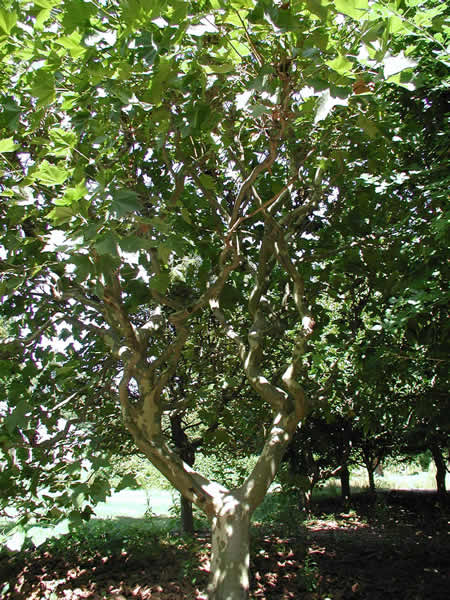
London Plane Tree at the Bartlett Arboretum & Gardens

The Bartlett Arboretum and Gardens in Stamford, Connecticut, contains 93 acres of parkland, gardens, landscapes, and hiking trails that focus on the regional plants, ecology and character of Southwestern New England. The Arboretum is open and accessible to the public every day of the year and is located at 151 Brookdale Road.

The herbarium of the Bartlett Arboretum is a collection of over 3500 specimens. While most specimens are from the Northeastern United States, the collection also houses material from the Southeastern United States and Adjacent Mexico (200), the Caribbean (100), Amazonian Peru (150), the former Soviet Union (200), and Africa (100). This collection includes approximately 2,500 species of vascular plants, and 1,000 species of bryophyte. The collection currently houses one type specimen.

== History ==
The Arboretum started in 1913, when Dr. Francis A. Bartlett, an eminent dendrologist and founder of the F.A. Bartlett Tree Expert Company, acquired "30 acres [12 hectares] more or less" of North Stamford woodland to use as his residence, training school and research laboratory for his company. Over the years, he assembled a large number of plant specimens on the property from all over the world. In 1965, when the research laboratory moved to North Carolina, the Stamford site, then covering more than 60 acres (24 hectares), was purchased by the State of Connecticut and designated the Connecticut State Arboretum. In 1993, the land and overall operation of the Arboretum were transferred to the University of Connecticut at Stamford. In 2001, the land was transferred to the City of Stamford and operations were transferred to the Bartlett Arboretum Association, an independent non-profit organization. The Bartlett Arboretum Association continues to operate the grounds today.

In 2006, the Arboretum began numerous research programs, continuing the tradition of research begun by Bartlett nearly a century earlier. Current research focuses on local plant ecology such as floristics and herbivory responses of Connecticut Forests, and the ecology and evolution of tropical plants, particularly the Araceae. This work has led to several published research papers by staff in the past few years.

== Collections ==
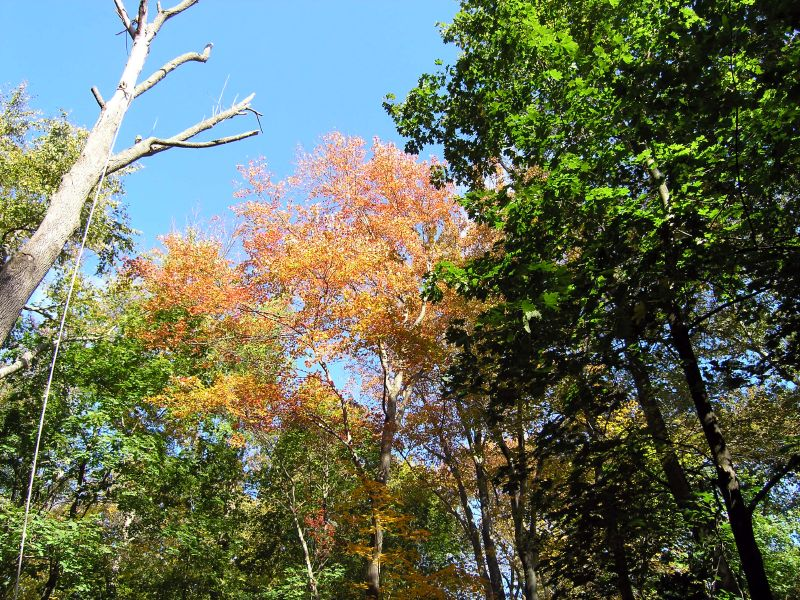
Bartlett Arboretum

The Arboretum contains the following collections:

- The Conifer Garden is a collection of conifers, including: Tsuga (hemlock), Pinus (pine), Picea (spruce), Abies (fir), Thuja (arborvitae), Chamaecyparis (false cypress), Juniperus (juniper), Cryptomeria (Japanese temple pine) and Taxus (yew).
- The Mehlquist Garden is a unique collection of Rhododendrons and Azaleas of native, Japanese, Korean and European origins: established by Dr. Gustav A.L. Mehlquist, Professor Emeritus of Plant Science at the University of Connecticut.
- The Nut Tree Collection is a grove planted by Francis Bartlett which includes Carya illinoinensis (pecans), Juglans sp. (walnuts), heartnuts, filberts, hicans, and a hardy Chestnut hybrid.
- The Pollarded Tree Display features deciduous trees kept compact by means of a special pruning technique called pollarding.
- The newly added Magnolia Collection is an area planted along the entrance roadway which contains numerous species including, but not limited to Magnolia tripetala, M. acuminata, M. sieboldii and M. virginiana
- The Theaceae collection, added in 2007, contains numerous species of the Tea family including Camellias, Gordonias, Franklinias, and Stewartias.

== Habitats ==
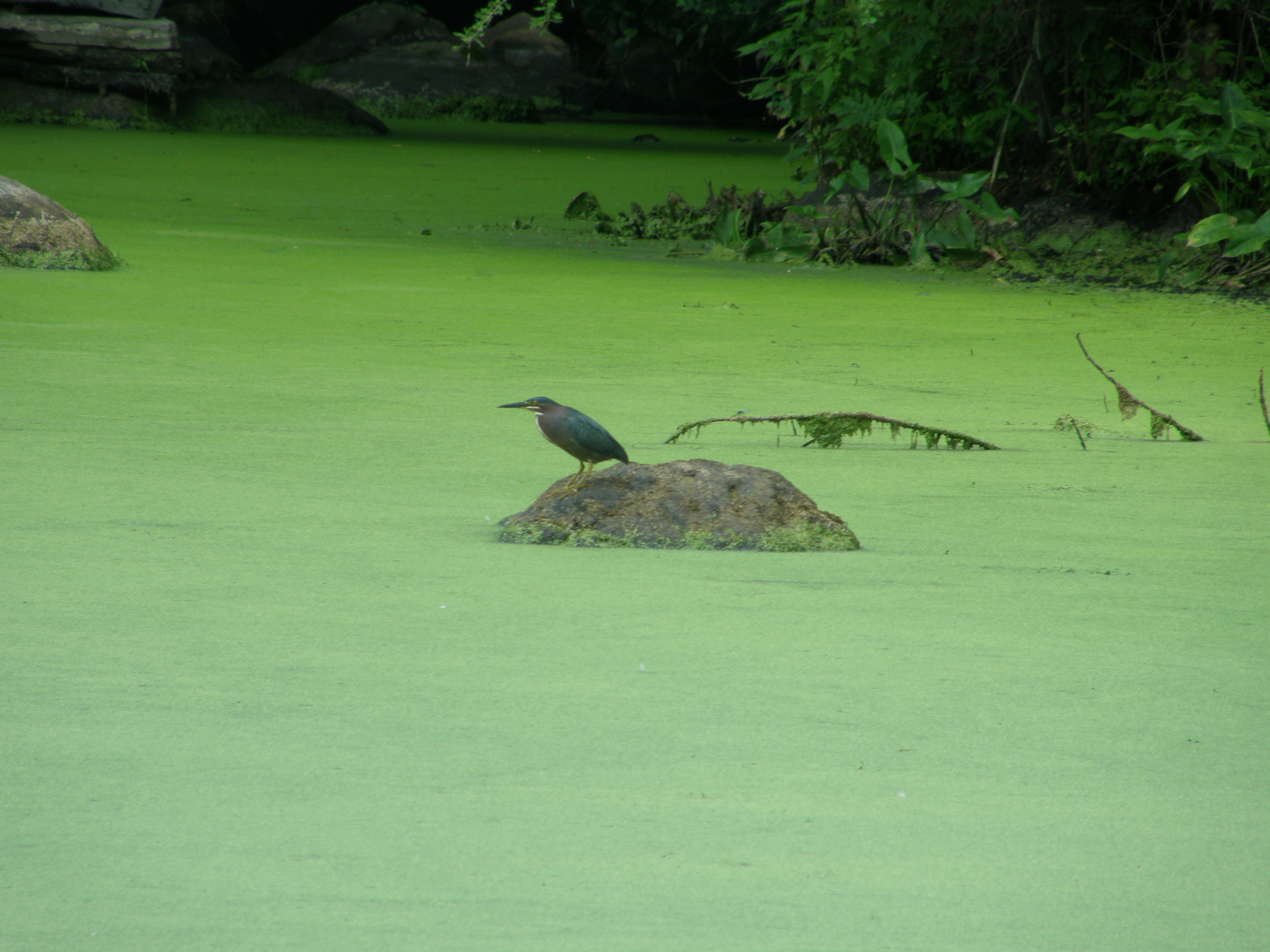
A green heron in the gardens

- The Arboretum’s meadow is a managed habitat. During the early twentieth century, abandoned farm fields became wildflower meadows rich in birds, bees, and butterflies. When tree seedlings in these meadows grew into forests, the wildflower meadows and wildlife that depended on them became scarce. The Arboretum established this meadow in 2000 as an example of a sustainable landscape that provides needed habitat and esthetic beauty. Depending on the time of year, wildflowers such as Coreopsis, Black-eyed Susan (Rudbeckia hirta), Beard-tongue (Penstemon digitalis), Goblet Aster (Aster lateriflorus), Blue-eyed Grass (Sisyrinchium bellum), Lupine (Lupinus) and Spiderwort (Tradescantia) may be seen. It is mowed annually in early April to prevent it from returning to forest.
- The Woodland Pond was created by a dam where the water pauses before spilling over to Poorhouse Brook and running south to Long Island Sound. A pond is a water body small enough that its waves do not erode the soil on its banks and shallow enough for aquatic plants to root in the bottom and still reach the surface. In the summer the pond will have the round leaves and pale pink flowers of Pond Lilies (Nuphar advena) in the middle and the arrow-shaped leaves of Arrow Arum (Peltandra virginica) around the edges. When the Arrow Arum flower has gone to seed the weight of the seeds bends the stalk over and it sinks into the muddy bottom; in this way the seeds plant themselves.
- The Red Maple Wetland is a favorite spot for area naturalists and ecologists because it is one of the only accessible Red Maple swamps in the area not significantly affected by either development or non-native invasive plants.

== See also ==
- List of botanical gardens and arboretums in the United States
