= Clusia tetramera =

Scientific classification
- Kingdom: Plantae
- Clade: Embryophytes
- Clade: Tracheophytes
- Clade: Angiosperms
- Clade: Eudicots
- Clade: Rosids
- Order: Malpighiales
- Family: Clusiaceae
- Genus: Clusia
- Species: C. tetramera

Binomial name
- Clusia tetramera J.E.Nascim. & Bittrich

Species of flowering plant

Clusia tetramera is a species of shrub in the family Clusiaceae. It has orange-brown flowers. The species is native to Venezuela. It was described in 2019, and named after its four stamens.

== Distribution ==
The species is native to the wet tropical biome of Venezuela. Specimens have been collected from a savanna near the Orinoco river, and the border of Venezuela and Colombia.

== Taxonomy ==
The species was first described in 2019, alongside Clusia dickinsoniana, Clusia donramonii, Clusia peterstevensii, and Clusia punctata. The type specimen was collected in 1967. The type locality is by a road between Puerto Ayacucho and Samariapo.

Within the genus Clusia, it is assigned to the section Oedematopus.

== Description ==
Clusia tetramera is a shrub that produces a white exudate.

The male inflorescences grow on 0.5–1 millimetre (0.020–0.039 in) stalks, and have three flowers each. The flower stalks are 0.5 millimetres (0.020 in) long, and fused at their bases. The flowers have four brown-orange petals. Clusia tetramera has four stamens, which are fused at the base. It flowers in August.

Clusia tetramera has tough and leathery leaves. The leaves are 5–9 centimetres (2.0–3.5 in) long, and 1.5–3 centimetres (0.59–1.18 in) wide. The leaf stalks are 8–12 millimetres (0.31–0.47 in) long.

Clusia tetramera is similar in vegetation to Clusia huberi, Clusia obovata, and Clusia octandra.

== Etymology ==
Clusia tetramera is named for its four stamens. It is the second species of the genus Clusia known to have four stamens, after Clusia flavida.
