= Clusia peterstevensii =

Scientific classification
- Kingdom: Plantae
- Clade: Tracheophytes
- Clade: Angiosperms
- Clade: Eudicots
- Clade: Rosids
- Order: Malpighiales
- Family: Clusiaceae
- Genus: Clusia
- Species: C. peterstevensii

Binomial name
- Clusia peterstevensii J.E.Nascim., Bittrich & M.C.E.Amaral

Species of flowering plant

Clusia peterstevensii is a species of flowering plant in the family Clusiaceae. C. peterstevensii is a tree that grows up to 6 metres (20 ft) tall. The species is native to Venezuela. It was described in 2019, and named after the botanist Peter F. Stevens.

== Taxonomy ==
The species was first described in 2019. The type specimen was collected in 1985, from the Río Negro Municipality, Venezuela, at an elevation of 1,450 metres (4,760 ft).

The type specimen was previously identified as Clusia oligandra, a name proposed by Bassett Maguire.

== Distribution ==
Clusia peterstevensii is native to the wet tropical biome of Venezuela. It is known only from the type material, which was collected on the broder of Brazil and Venezuela.

== Description ==
Clusia peterstevensii is a tree or treelet, which may be hemiepiphytic. It grows up to 6 metres (20 ft) tall.

The leaves are tough and leathery, elliptical in shape, and measure 6.5–10.5 centimetres (2.6–4.1 in) long by 3–5.5 centimetres (1.2–2.2 in) wide. The leaf stalks are 1–2 centimetres (0.39–0.79 in) long.

The flowers are yellowish, and have four petals each. The inflorescences grow on 1.5 centimetres (0.59 in) stalks, are around 4 centimetres (1.6 in) long, and have five or six flowers. The flower stalks are 2–4 millimetres (0.079–0.157 in) long. The plant flowers in February.

Clusia peterstevensii is similar to Clusia donramonii. However, male flowers of Clusia peterstevensii are smaller, and have fewer stamens.

== Etymology ==
The species is named after the botanical systematist Peter F. Stevens.
