= Carlos Santana (disambiguation) =

Carlos Santana (born 1947) is a Mexican-American musician.

Carlos Santana may also refer to:

- Carlos Santana (baseball) (born 1986), first baseman from the Dominican Republic
- Carlos Santana (footballer) (born 1953), football midfielder from Costa Rica
- Carlos Santana Tovar, Venezuelan businessman and politician
