= Clusia cupulata =

Conservation status
- Vulnerable (IUCN 2.3)

Scientific classification
- Kingdom: Plantae
- Clade: Tracheophytes
- Clade: Angiosperms
- Clade: Eudicots
- Clade: Rosids
- Order: Malpighiales
- Family: Clusiaceae
- Genus: Clusia
- Species: C. cupulata

Binomial name
- Clusia cupulata (Maguire) Maguire

Synonyms
- Clusia salvinii var. cupulata Maguire

Species of flowering plant

Clusia cupulata is a species of flowering plant in the family Clusiaceae. It is a tree native to Panama and western Colombia. It grows in undisturbed lowland and lower montane rain forest up to 1,200 meters elevation. It is threatened by habitat loss.
