= Clusia osseocarpa =

Conservation status
- Least Concern (IUCN 3.1)

Scientific classification
- Kingdom: Plantae
- Clade: Tracheophytes
- Clade: Angiosperms
- Clade: Eudicots
- Clade: Rosids
- Order: Malpighiales
- Family: Clusiaceae
- Genus: Clusia
- Species: C. osseocarpa

Binomial name
- Clusia osseocarpa Maguire

Species of flowering plant

Clusia osseocarpa is a species of flowering plant in the family Clusiaceae. It is an epiphytic shrub or tree native to Costa Rica and Panama, where it grows in lowland and montane rain forests up to 1,400 meters elevation. It is threatened by habitat loss.

The species was described by Bassett Maguire in 1978.
