= C. major =

C. major may refer to:

- Ceramornis major, an extinct bird species from the Late Cretaceous
- Cettia major, the chestnut-crowned bush warbler, a warbler species found in South Asia
- Clusia major, the autograph tree or pitch-apple, a plant species
- Copiula major, a frog species found in Indonesia and possibly Papua New Guinea
- Ctenacanthus major, a prehistoric fish species

== See also ==
- Major (disambiguation)
- C major – a key in music
