= Clusia paralicola =

Conservation status
- Least Concern (IUCN 3.1)

Scientific classification
- Kingdom: Plantae
- Clade: Tracheophytes
- Clade: Angiosperms
- Clade: Eudicots
- Clade: Rosids
- Order: Malpighiales
- Family: Clusiaceae
- Genus: Clusia
- Species: C. paralicola

Binomial name
- Clusia paralicola G.Mariz

Species of plant

Clusia paralicola is a species of flowering plant in the family Clusiaceae. It is found in northeastern Brazil (Paraíba, Pernambuco, Bahia, Alagoas).

It was described by Geraldo Mariz (born 1923), a Brazilian botanist.
