= Clusia pseudomangle =

Conservation status
- Least Concern (IUCN 3.1)

Scientific classification
- Kingdom: Plantae
- Clade: Tracheophytes
- Clade: Angiosperms
- Clade: Eudicots
- Clade: Rosids
- Order: Malpighiales
- Family: Clusiaceae
- Genus: Clusia
- Species: C. pseudomangle

Binomial name
- Clusia pseudomangle Planch. & Triana

Species of plant

Clusia pseudomangle is a species of flowering plant in the family Clusiaceae. It is found only in Peru.
