= Clusia clusioides =

Conservation status
- Least Concern (IUCN 3.1)

Scientific classification
- Kingdom: Plantae
- Clade: Tracheophytes
- Clade: Angiosperms
- Clade: Eudicots
- Clade: Rosids
- Order: Malpighiales
- Family: Clusiaceae
- Genus: Clusia
- Species: C. clusioides

Binomial name
- Clusia clusioides (Griseb.) D'Arcy

Synonyms
- Chrysochlamys clusioides (Griseb.) Griseb.; Tovomita clusioides Griseb.; Clusia grisebachiana (Planch. & Triana) Alain; Clusia krugiana Urb.; Tovomita grisebachiana Planch. & Triana

Species of flowering plant

Clusia clusioides is species of flowering plant in the family Clusiaceae. It is a small tree which that is native to Puerto Rico and Hispaniola. One characteristic are the opposite, very thick leaves. It is very common in the dwarf or elfin forests at elevations above c. 2,500 feet (760 m), in particular in areas with much light (e.g., next to service roads in Puerto Rico's El Yunque rain forest). The gray and smooth bark of the tree is sometimes covered with mosses and other epiphytes including orchids.
