= Maguireothamnus =

Scientific classification
- Kingdom: Plantae
- Clade: Tracheophytes
- Clade: Angiosperms
- Clade: Eudicots
- Clade: Asterids
- Order: Gentianales
- Family: Rubiaceae
- Genus: Maguireothamnus; Steyerm.

Genus of plants

Maguireothamnus is a genus of flowering plants belonging to the family Rubiaceae.

Its native range is the Guyana Highlands, between Guyana and Venezuela.

The genus name of Maguireothamnus is in honour of Bassett Maguire (1904–1991), an American botanist, head curator of the New York Botanical Garden, and a leader of scientific expeditions to the Guyana Highlands in Brazil and Venezuela. It was first described and published in Mem. New York Bot. Gard. Vol.10 (Issue 5) on page 220 in 1964.

== Known species ==
According to Kew:

- Maguireothamnus speciosus (N.E.Br.) Steyerm.
- Maguireothamnus tatei (Standl.) Steyerm.
