= Clusia alata =

Conservation status
- Least Concern (IUCN 3.1)

Scientific classification
- Kingdom: Plantae
- Clade: Tracheophytes
- Clade: Angiosperms
- Clade: Eudicots
- Clade: Rosids
- Order: Malpighiales
- Family: Clusiaceae
- Genus: Clusia
- Species: C. alata

Binomial name
- Clusia alata Planch. & Triana

Species of tree

Clusia alata is a species of flowering plant in the family Clusiaceae. It is a tree with distinctly obovate leaves and cream colored and 5-petaled flowers.

It is native to Colombia, Ecuador, and Venezuela, where it grows in montane rain forests from 500 to 3,500 meters elevation and generally above 1,000 meters.

The species was described by Jules Émile Planchon and José Jerónimo Triana in 1860.
