= Carlos Santana Tovar =

Venezuelan businessman and politician

Carlos Santana Tovar was a Venezuelan businessman, government official and politician. In the mid-20th century he was a prominent rubber trader and local official in San Carlos de Río Negro, and represented the Federal Territory of Amazonas in the Constituent Assembly during the rule of Marcos Pérez Jiménez.

== Childhood and the Funes era ==
He was born in San Fernando de Atabapo, son of Carlos Tovar from Barinas and Petra Mirabal from Amazonas. His youth in San Fernando de Atabapo coincided with the rule of Tomás Funes in the Federal Territory of Amazonas (1913–1921). Funes would provide schooling for Carlos along with his friends Pedro López Pérez and Pedro Nolasco Chacín, and the trio became seen as protégés of the de facto ruler of the Territory. Carlos' teacher was Ocanto Pérez at the First Federal School.

== Revolution and exile ==
When the revolution of 1921 led by Emilio Arévalo Cedeño overthrew Funes, the three boys (Santana Tovar, Nolasco and López) were brought to Periquera (Apure) by the revolutionaries and held as hostages there. In Apure they had to work in cattle herding and farming duties. After three years of servitude the trio managed to escape. They spent three months on the run, moving through fields and jungle. They eventually reached San José de Maipures in Colombia, where they were hosted by the Commissar of Vichada Carlos Palau for a month. Re-entering Venezuela they opted to head for San Carlos de Río Negro rather than their native town of San Fernando de Atabapo, as the latter was perceived as too close to the reach of the revolutionaries. Whilst Pedro López would later return to San Fernando de Atabapo, Carlos and Pedro Nolasco settled down in San Carlos de Río Negro.

== Rubber trader ==
In San Carlos de Río Negro Carlos Santana Tovar met and married Marcolina Figueredo. The couple had three biological children - Ismael Antonio, Carlos Israel and Gladys. The couple adopted José Rafael, Pedro Manuel, Onilcio, Alfredo, Armenia and Noemí.

Carlos Santana Tovar became a rubber-trade entrepreneur in the area, he ran a bunkhouse at the mouth of Río Pasiva and was one of the first in the Territory to have a fixed-motor boat (La Santa Rosa) that brought rubber from San Carlos de Río Negro to Samariapo. He would later own two other boats for passenger and cargo transport - Gladys and Deglys.

Living in Santa Rosa de Amandona, led the effort to set up a new village closer to the Brazilian border (El Carmen). In Santa Rosa de Amandona, he performed some health services to the population (such as first aid, extracting teeth or giving injections).

== Government official and politician ==
He would serve in various public offices - he served as Chief Intervening Agent of Customs in Santa Rosa de Amandona, Civil Department Chief of Río Negro and Department Prefect of Casiquiare.

In the 1952 Venezuelan Constituent Assembly election, Carlos Santana Tovar was elected as the sole delegate from the Federal Territory of Amazonas.
