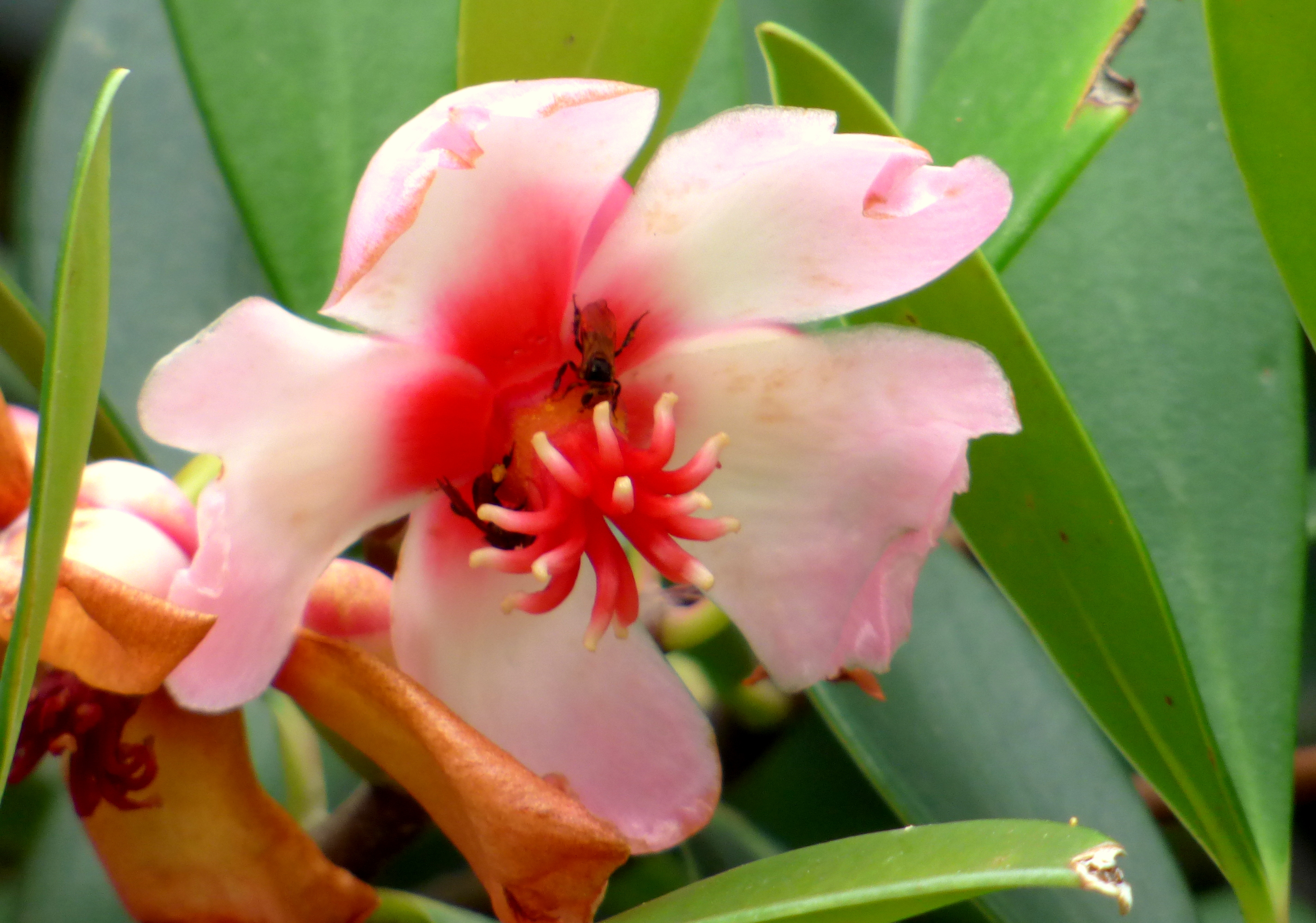
- Flower
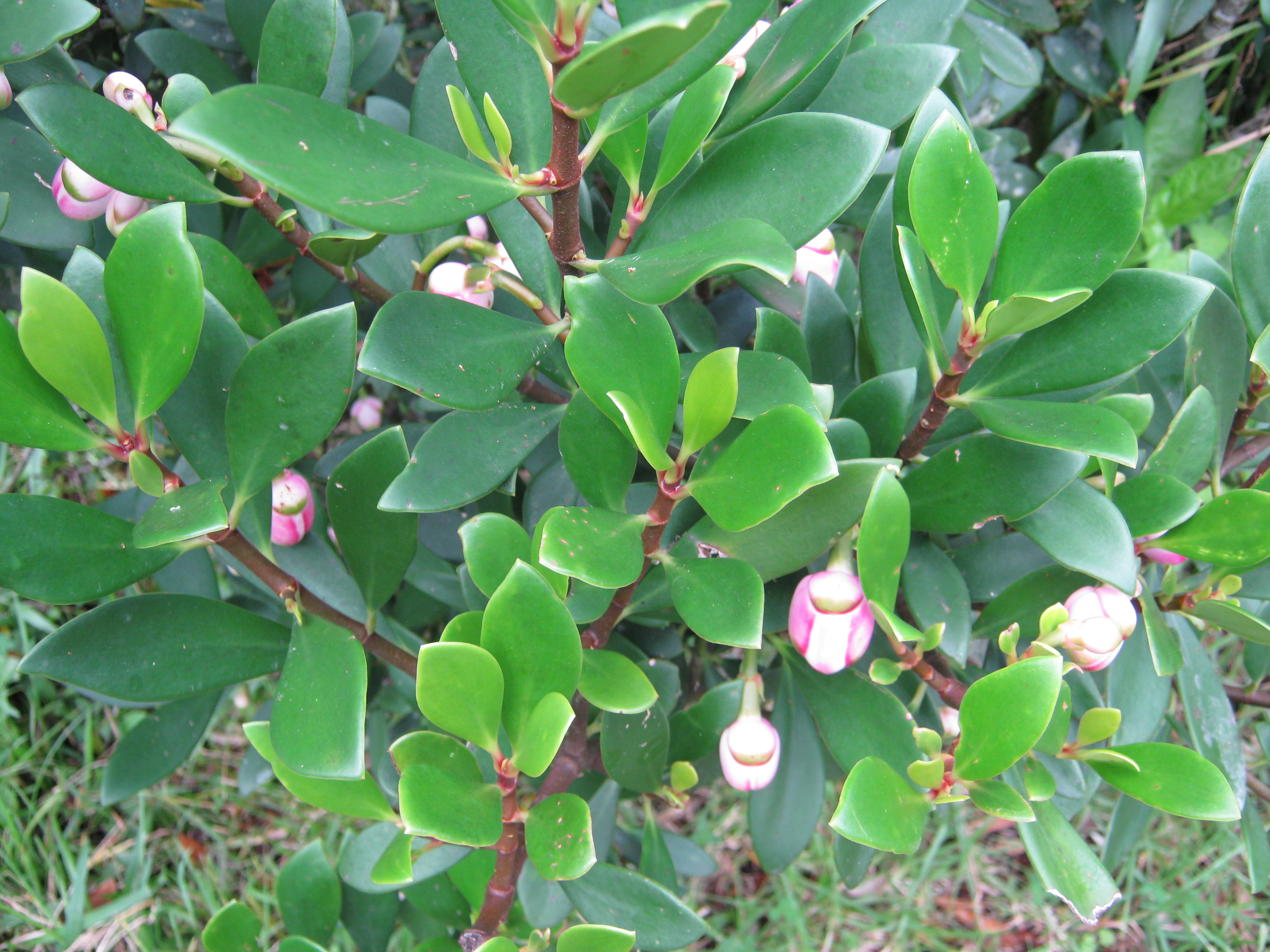
- Foliage

Conservation status
- Least Concern (IUCN 3.1)

Scientific classification
- Kingdom: Plantae
- Clade: Embryophytes
- Clade: Tracheophytes
- Clade: Spermatophytes
- Clade: Angiosperms
- Clade: Eudicots
- Clade: Rosids
- Order: Malpighiales
- Family: Clusiaceae
- Genus: Clusia
- Species: C. orthoneura

Binomial name
- Clusia orthoneura Standl.

= Clusia orthoneura =

Species of plant

Clusia orthoneura, the cape, is a species of flowering plant in the family Clusiaceae. It is native to Colombia. An epiphytic shrub reaching 1.2 to 2.4 m (4 to 8 ft), it is recommended as a houseplant.

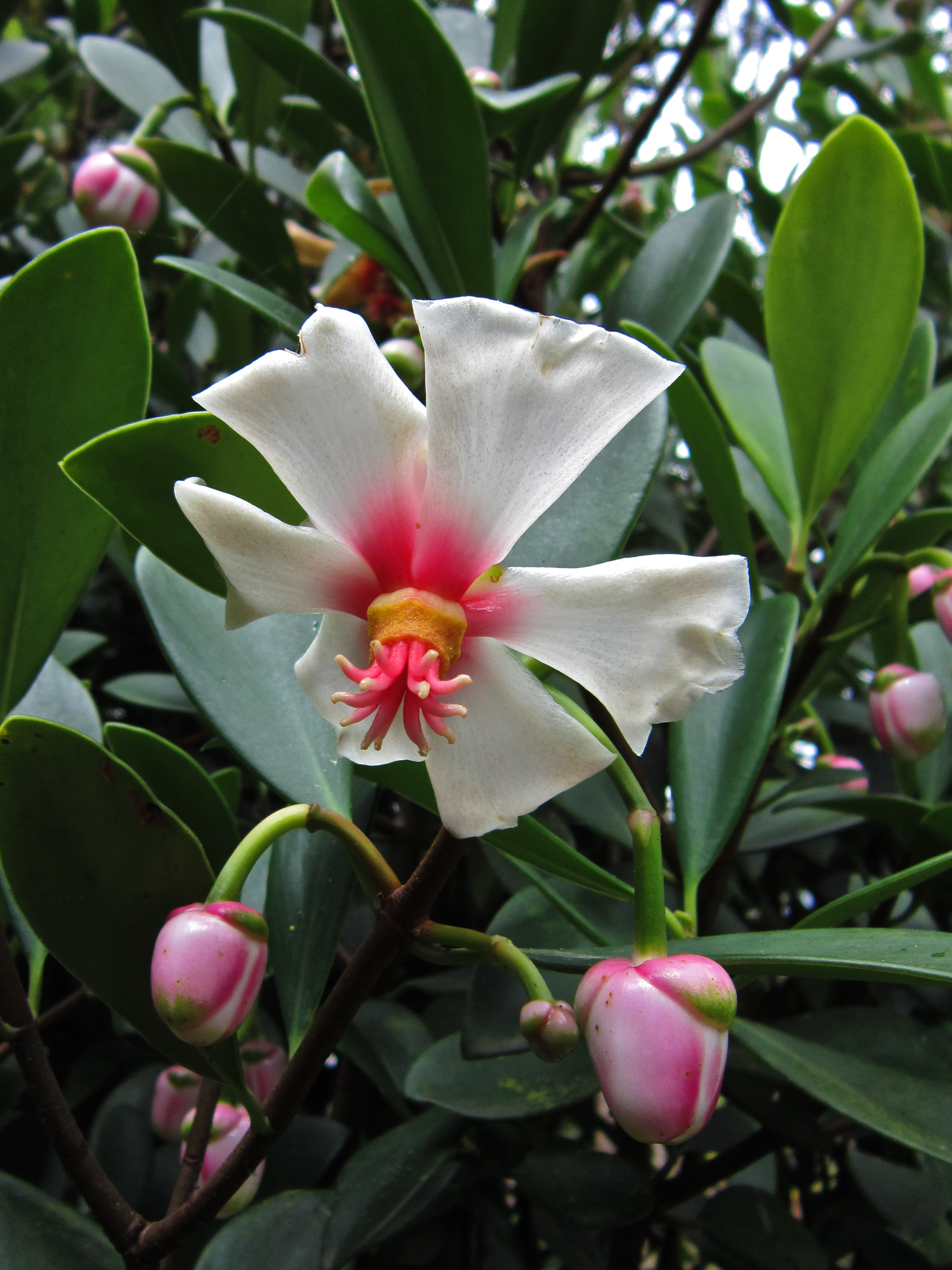
A white flowered individual

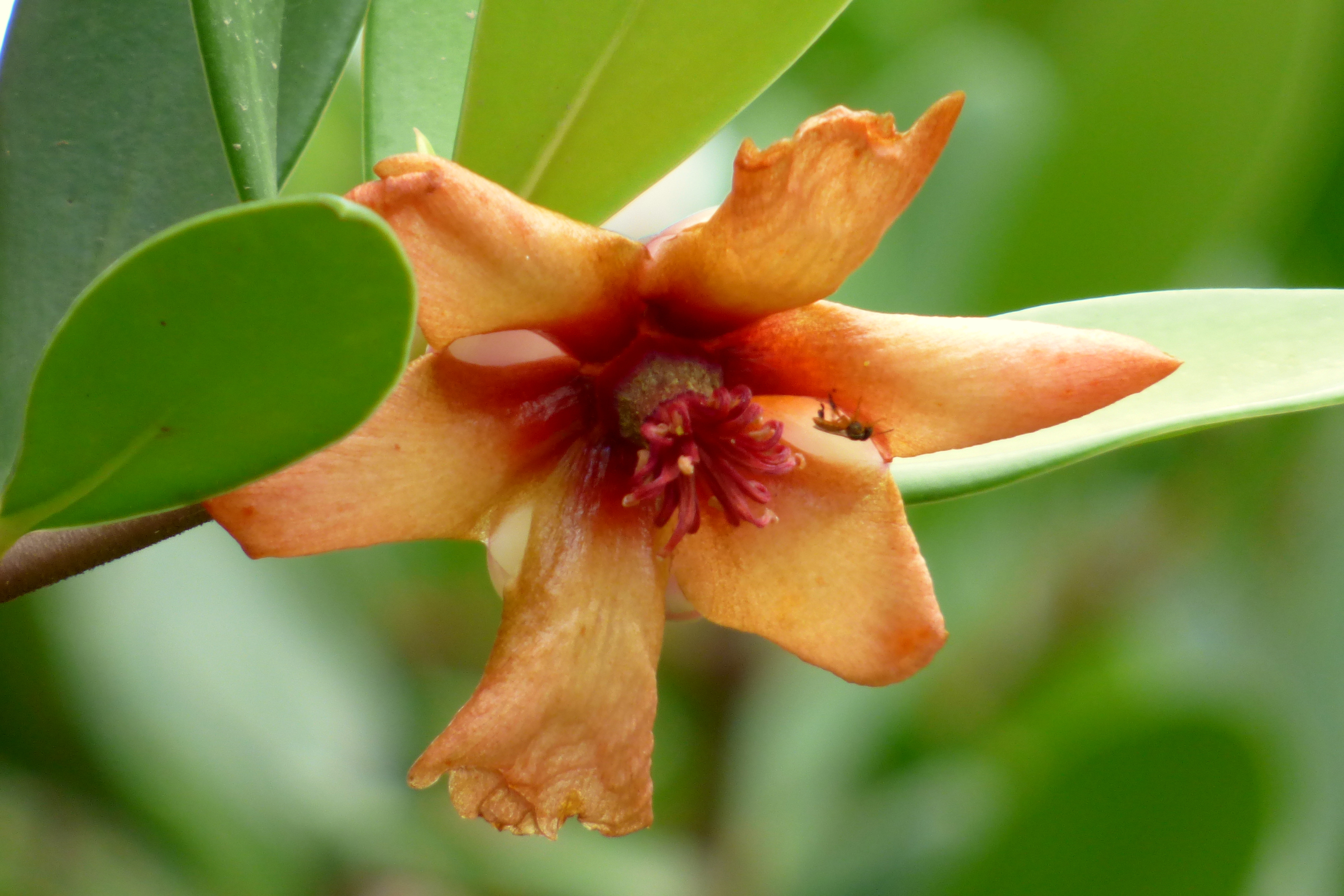
A spent flower

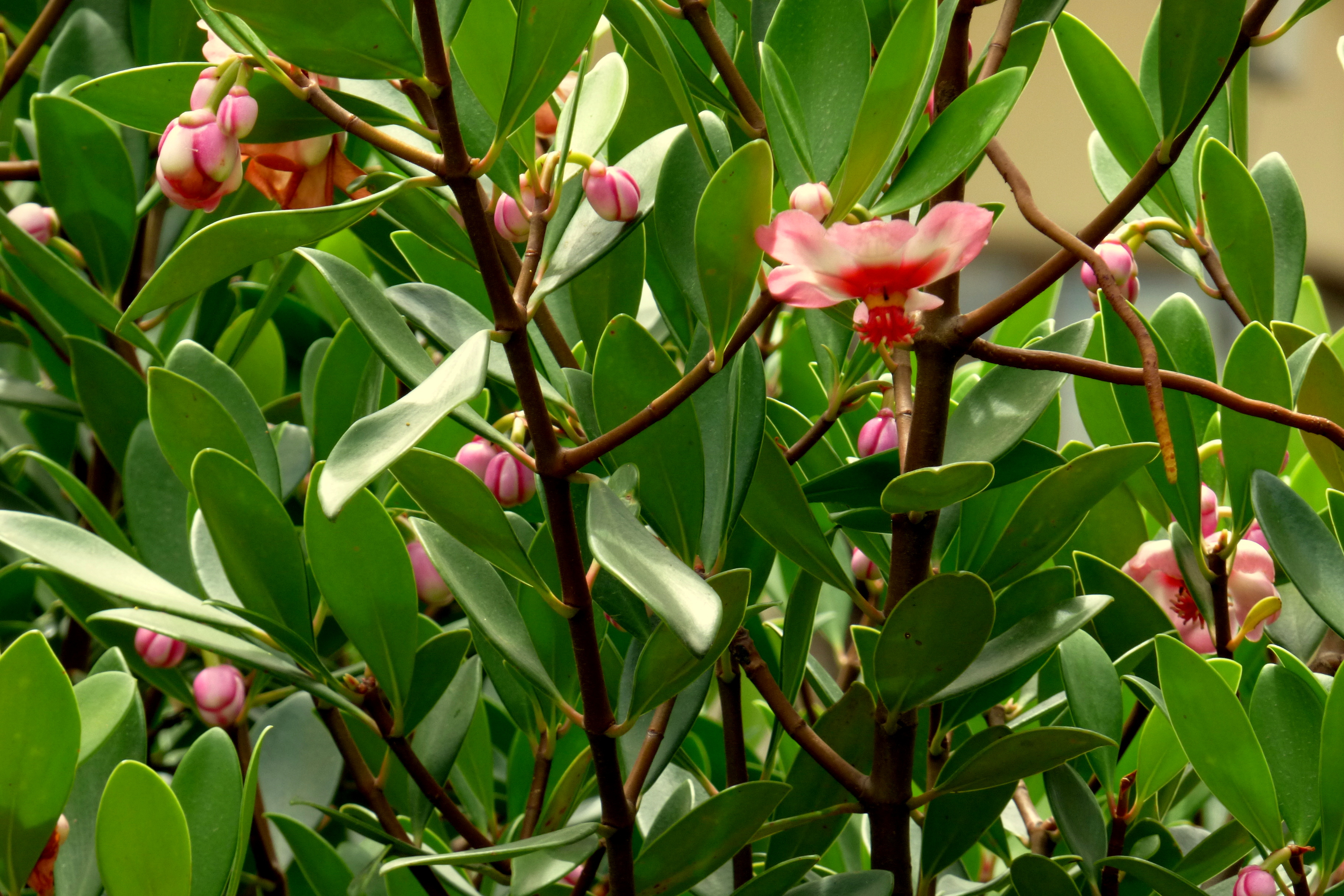
Another view
