= Maguireanthus =

Scientific classification
- Kingdom: Plantae
- Clade: Tracheophytes
- Clade: Angiosperms
- Clade: Eudicots
- Clade: Rosids
- Order: Myrtales
- Family: Melastomataceae
- Genus: Maguireanthus; Wurdack
- Species: M. ayangannae

Binomial name
- Maguireanthus ayangannae Wurdack

Species of plants

Maguireanthus is a monotypic genus of flowering plants belonging to the family Melastomataceae. The only species is Maguireanthus ayangannae Wurdack.

It is native to Guyana.

The genus name of Maguireanthus is in honour of Bassett Maguire (1904–1991), an American botanist, head curator of the New York Botanical Garden, and a leader of scientific expeditions to the Guyana Highlands in Brazil and Venezuela. The Latin specific epithet of ayangannae refers to Mount Ayanganna in western Guyana in the Pakaraima Mountains. Both the genus and species were first described and published in Mem. New York Bot. Gard. Vol.10 (Issue 5) on page 155 in 1964.
