= Clusia polystigma =

Conservation status
- Vulnerable (IUCN 3.1)

Scientific classification
- Kingdom: Plantae
- Clade: Tracheophytes
- Clade: Angiosperms
- Clade: Eudicots
- Clade: Rosids
- Order: Malpighiales
- Family: Clusiaceae
- Genus: Clusia
- Species: C. polystigma

Binomial name
- Clusia polystigma Little

Species of flowering plant

Clusia polystigma is a species of flowering plant in the family Clusiaceae. It is a tree native to western Colombia and Ecuador. Its natural habitat is lowland tropical moist forest.

The species was described by Elbert Luther Little in 1948.
