= Clusia punctata =

Scientific classification
- Kingdom: Plantae
- Clade: Tracheophytes
- Clade: Angiosperms
- Clade: Eudicots
- Clade: Rosids
- Order: Malpighiales
- Family: Clusiaceae
- Genus: Clusia
- Species: C. punctata

Binomial name
- Clusia punctata J.E.Nascim. & Bittrich

Species of flowering plant

Clusia punctata is a species of tree in the family Clusiaceae. The species grows up to 10 metres (33 ft) tall, and produces flowers and fruits in March and May. It is native to tepuis in southern Venezuela.

Clusia punctata was described in 2019, and named for the brown glands on the underside of its leaves.

== Distribution ==
Clusia punctata is native to the wet tropical biome of Venezuela. Specimens have been collected from tepuis in the southern Venezuelan states of Amazonas and Bolívar.

== Taxonomy ==
Clusia punctata was described in 2019. The type specimens were collected in 1973, at an elevation of 1,400 metres (4,600 ft), in the Pacaraima Mountains, Bolívar, Venezuela.

== Description ==
Clusia punctata is a tree that grows up to 10 metres (33 ft) high. It produces a white exudate.

The leaves measure 7–15 centimetres (2.8–5.9 in) long by 3–7 centimetres (1.2–2.8 in) wide. They are slightly leathery in texture, and elliptical in shape. The undersides of the leaves have visible glands. The leaf stalks are 1–2.5 centimetres (0.39–0.98 in) long.

The flowers have four petals each, which are deciduous. Male inflorescences have around thirty flowers, whereas female inflorescences have around nine flowers. The inflorescences grow on 1–1.5 millimetres (0.039–0.059 in) long stalks. The plant flowers from March to May.

The plant produces smooth, roughly spherical fruits, which are green when immature. The fruits are around 1.5 centimetres (0.59 in) in size. The plant fruits fron March to May.

Clusia punctata is similar to Clusia donramonii.

== Etymology ==
The specific name punctata is derived from Latin punctatus (dotted), referring to the brown glands visible on the underside of the leaves.
