= Maguireocharis =

Scientific classification
- Kingdom: Plantae
- Clade: Tracheophytes
- Clade: Angiosperms
- Clade: Eudicots
- Clade: Asterids
- Order: Gentianales
- Family: Rubiaceae
- Genus: Maguireocharis; Steyerm.

Species of plants

Maguireocharis is a monotypic genus of flowering plants belonging to the family Rubiaceae. It only contains one known species, Maguireocharis neblinae Steyerm.

It is native to southern Venezuela and northern Brazil.

The genus name of Maguireocharis is in honour of Bassett Maguire (1904–1991), an American botanist, head curator of the New York Botanical Garden, and a leader of scientific expeditions to the Guyana Highlands in Brazil and Venezuela. The Latin specific epithet of neblinae refers to Sierra de la Neblina a sandstone Massif in Venezuela. In 1954, Bassett Maguire discovered the botanically rich Cerro de la Neblina (or "Mountain of the Clouds").

Both the genus and the species were first described and published in Mem. New York Bot. Gard. Vol.23 on page 230 in 1972.
