= Clusia plurivalvis =

Conservation status
- Critically Endangered (IUCN 3.1)

Scientific classification
- Kingdom: Plantae
- Clade: Tracheophytes
- Clade: Angiosperms
- Clade: Eudicots
- Clade: Rosids
- Order: Malpighiales
- Family: Clusiaceae
- Genus: Clusia
- Species: C. plurivalvis

Binomial name
- Clusia plurivalvis Little

Species of flowering plant

Clusia plurivalvis is a species of flowering plant in the family Clusiaceae. It is found only in Ecuador. Its natural habitat is subtropical or tropical moist montane forest.
