= Clusia tarmensis =

Conservation status
- Vulnerable (IUCN 3.1)

Scientific classification
- Kingdom: Plantae
- Clade: Tracheophytes
- Clade: Angiosperms
- Clade: Eudicots
- Clade: Rosids
- Order: Malpighiales
- Family: Clusiaceae
- Genus: Clusia
- Species: C. tarmensis

Binomial name
- Clusia tarmensis Engl.

Species of plant

Clusia tarmensis is a species of flowering plant in the family Clusiaceae. It is a tree found only in Peru. It is a small tree growing up to 8 meters tall. It is native to the Perené and Urubamba watersheds on the eastern (Amazonian) slope of the Andes in Cusco, Junín, and Pasco departments. It grows in montane rain forests (Yungas), on white sandstone outcrops with Sphagnum bogs, and in open woodlands from 1,000 to 3,000 meters elevation.

The species was described by Adolf Engler in 1923.
