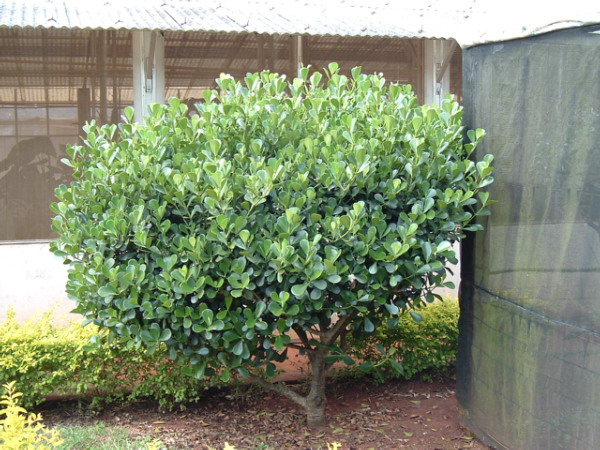
- Clusia fluminensis

Scientific classification
- Kingdom: Plantae
- Clade: Tracheophytes
- Clade: Angiosperms
- Clade: Eudicots
- Clade: Rosids
- Order: Malpighiales
- Family: Clusiaceae
- Tribe: Clusieae
- Genus: Clusia; L.

Species
- 327, see text

Synonyms
- Androstylium Miq. (1851); Arrudea A.St.-Hil. & Cambess. (1828); Asthotheca Miers ex Planch. & Triana (1860); Birolia Raf. (1838); Cahota H.Karst. (1856); Cochlanthera Choisy (1851); Decaphalangium Melch. (1930); Elwertia Raf. 163 (1838); Firkea Raf. (1838); Gardenia Colden (1756), nom. rej.; Havetia Kunth (1822); Icostegia Raf. (1838); Lipophyllum Miers (1855); Oedematopus Planch. & Triana (1860); Oxystemon Planch. & Triana (1860); Pilosperma Planch. & Triana (1860); Polythecandra Planch. & Triana (1860); Renggeria Meisn. (1837); Rengifa Poepp. (1840); Schweiggera Mart. (1829), nom. illeg.; Triplandron Benth. (1844); Xanthe Schreb. (1791)

= Clusia =

Genus of flowering plants

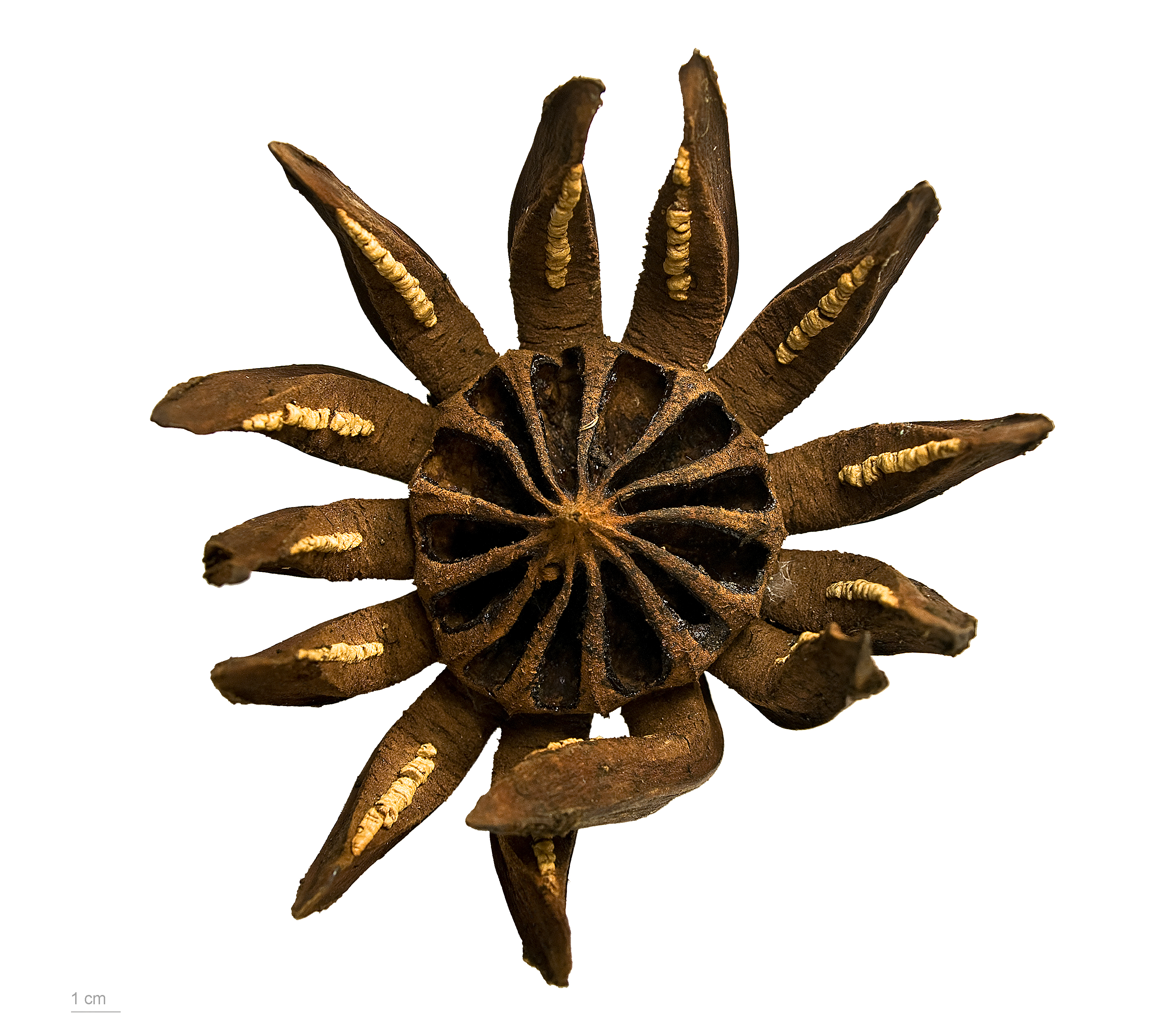
Clusia grandiflora - MHNT

Clusia is the type genus of the flowering plant family Clusiaceae. Comprising 300-400 species, it is native to the Neotropics. The genus is named by Carl Linnaeus in honor of the botanist Carolus Clusius.

== Taxonomy ==
The closest relatives of Clusia are the neotropical genera Chrysochlamys, Tovomita, Dystovomita and Tovomitopsis. Together with Clusia, these genera form the tribe Clusieae, where the fruit is a fleshy capsule with arillate seeds.

== Distribution and habitat ==
The distribution ranges from the Florida Keys and southern Mexico to southernmost Brazil, and from near sea level to at least 3500 m altitude in the northern Andes. The apomictic Clusia rosea is an invasive species in Hawaii and Sri Lanka, and possibly elsewhere.

Species of Clusia are a characteristic component of a number of Neotropical vegetation types, and may even be dominant, as is often seen in montane forests of the Greater Antilles. Most species are found in lowland or montane rainforests, but some occur in drier habitats such as the restingas of Brazil, Caribbean coastal scrub and dry inter-Andean valleys. A number of species are confined to rocky habitats, such as tepuis or granitic inselbergs. A few grow as scattered shrubs in páramo.

== Description ==
Its species are shrubs, vines and small to medium-size trees up to 20 m tall, with evergreen foliage. Some species start life as epiphytes which grow long roots that descend to the ground and eventually strangle and kill the host tree in a manner similar to strangler figs.

Many Clusia species have Crassulacean acid metabolism, which can be considered an adaptation to the often dry (micro)habitats of the genus.

The plants contain variously coloured latex in stems, leaves and fruit. The leaves are simple, entire and opposite, 5–70 cm long and 2–20 cm broad. Leaf texture is usually leathery, less commonly rigid or slightly succulent. Flower size varies from ca 5 mm wide (e.g. Clusia gundlachii) to ca 150 mm in Clusia grandiflora. The 4-9 petals are white, cream, yellow, pink, red, blackish or green. Flowers are unisexual and plants are dioecious (pistillate and staminate flowers are borne on separate plants). Stamen number ranges from four to several hundred. Shape and size of stamens are extremely variable. Sterile stamens are often present, both in pistillate and staminate flowers. Stigmas are four to 16 in number and usually sessile. The fruit is a leathery valvate capsule which splits open to release several red or orange, fleshy-coated seeds.

== Ecology ==
Pollination involves a range of different animals, and several types of rewards. Floral resin occurs in many, probably most species of Clusia. The resin is produced by the stamens (by sterile stamens, referred to as staminodes, in pistillate flowers) and is collected by bees that use it in nest construction. Nectar is most common in montane species, e.g. Clusia clusioides, and these flowers are visited by insects such as moths and wasps, and sometimes by bats or hummingbirds. In flowers lacking nectar or resin, pollination may be carried out by pollen-eating beetles, which visit also the rewardless pistillate flowers, as observed in Clusia criuva. Clusia blattophila is pollinated by male cockroaches attracted by a pheromone-containing fluid produced by the flowers.

Seeds are dispersed by birds and perhaps, in some cases, by small mammals.

Clusia plants provide excellent nesting sites for some insects. For instance, Clusia grandiflora, a common species in Guianese forests, is an attractive place for Polistes pacificus wasps to build their paper nests because arboreal ants, which often prey on these wasps, do not normally reside in this species of tree.

== Uses ==
The wood of Clusia is highly durable, and is sometimes used for roof construction. The latex and the floral resin have antiseptic properties and have been used to seal wounds. Dry latex is sometimes burned like incense in churches. A few species are grown as house plants, or, in tropical areas, as ornamental trees and shrubs. Examples are Clusia rosea, C. major and C. orthoneura.

== Selected species ==
327 species are currently accepted. Selected species include:

- Clusia aequatoriensis (Benoist) L.Marinho & A.Caro
- Clusia alata Planch. & Triana
- Clusia amazonica Planch. & Triana
- Clusia blattophila M.H.G.Gust. & Vlasáková
- Clusia bracteosa Cuatrec.
- Clusia carinata Engl.
- Clusia caudata (Planch. & Triana) Pipoly
- Clusia celiae Maguire
- Clusia clarendonensis Britton
- Clusia clusioides (Griseb.) D'Arcy
- Clusia cochlitheca Maguire
- Clusia colombiana Pipoly
- Clusia columnaris Engl.
- Clusia congestiflora Cuatrec.
- Clusia crenata Cuatrec.
- Clusia croatii D'Arcy
- Clusia cuneifolia Cuatrec.
- Clusia cupulata (Maguire) Maguire
- Clusia decussata Ruiz & Pav. ex Planch. & Triana
- Clusia dickinsoniana J.E.Nascim.
- Clusia dixonii Little
- Clusia donramonii J.E.Nascim.
- Clusia ducu Benth.
- Clusia ducuoides Engl.
- Clusia duidae Gleason
- Clusia elliptica Kunth
- Clusia flava Jacq.
- Clusia flavida (Benth.) Pipoly
- Clusia fluminensis Planch. & Triana
- Clusia fockeana Miq.
- Clusia fructiangusta Cuatrec.
- Clusia garciabarrigae Cuatrec.
- Clusia gardneri Planch. & Triana
- Clusia grandiflora Splitg.
- Clusia gundlachii A.Stahl
- Clusia hammeliana Pipoly
- Clusia haugtii Cuatrec.
- Clusia hilariana Schltdl.
- Clusia hydrogera Cuatrec.
- Clusia hyleae Pipoly
- Clusia insignis Mart.
- Clusia lanceolata Cambess.
- Clusia latipes Planch. & Triana
- Clusia laurifolia Planch. & Triana
- Clusia laxiflora (Poepp.) Planch. & Triana
- Clusia leprantha Mart.
- Clusia lineata (Benth.) Planch. & Triana
- Clusia longipetiolata Schery
- Clusia longistyla Cuatrec.
- Clusia loretensis Engl.
- Clusia magnoliiflora M.H.G.Gust.
- Clusia major L.
- Clusia melchiorii Gleason
- Clusia mexiae P.F.Stevens
- Clusia minor L.
- Clusia minutiflora Diels
- Clusia nemorosa G.Mey.
- Clusia nubium M.H.G.Gust. & Borchs.
- Clusia octandra (Poepp.) Pipoly
- Clusia orthoneura Standl.
- Clusia osseocarpa Maguire
- Clusia pallida Engl.
- Clusia palmicida Rich. ex Planch. & Triana
- Clusia panapanari (Aubl.) Choisy
- Clusia paralicola G.Mariz
- Clusia penduliflora Engl.
- Clusia pernambucensis G.Mariz
- Clusia peterstevensii J.E.Nascim.
- Clusia platystigma Eyma
- Clusia plurivalvis Little
- Clusia polystigma Little
- Clusia portlandiana R.A.Howard & Proctor
- Clusia pseudomangle Planch. & Triana
- Clusia pulcherrima Engl.
- Clusia punctata J.E.Nascim.
- Clusia renggerioides Planch. & Triana
- Clusia rigida M.H.G.Gust.
- Clusia rosea Jacq. – Scotch attorney, autograph tree, pitch-apple
- Clusia schomburgkiana (Planch. & Triana) Benth. ex Engl.
- Clusia sellowiana Schltdl.
- Clusia skotaster Gilli
- Clusia sphaerocarpa Planch. & Triana
- Clusia spiritu-sanctensis G.Mariz & B.Weinberg
- Clusia stenophylla Standl.
- Clusia tarmensis Engl.
- Clusia tetramera J.E.Nascim.
- Clusia thurifera Planch. & Triana
- Clusia triflora Cuatrec.
- Clusia trochiformis Vesqne
- Clusia uvitana Pittier
- Clusia valerii Standl.
- Clusia venusta Little
- Clusia viscida Engl.
- Clusia weberbaueri Engl.
- Clusia weddelliana Planch. & Triana

== Gallery ==
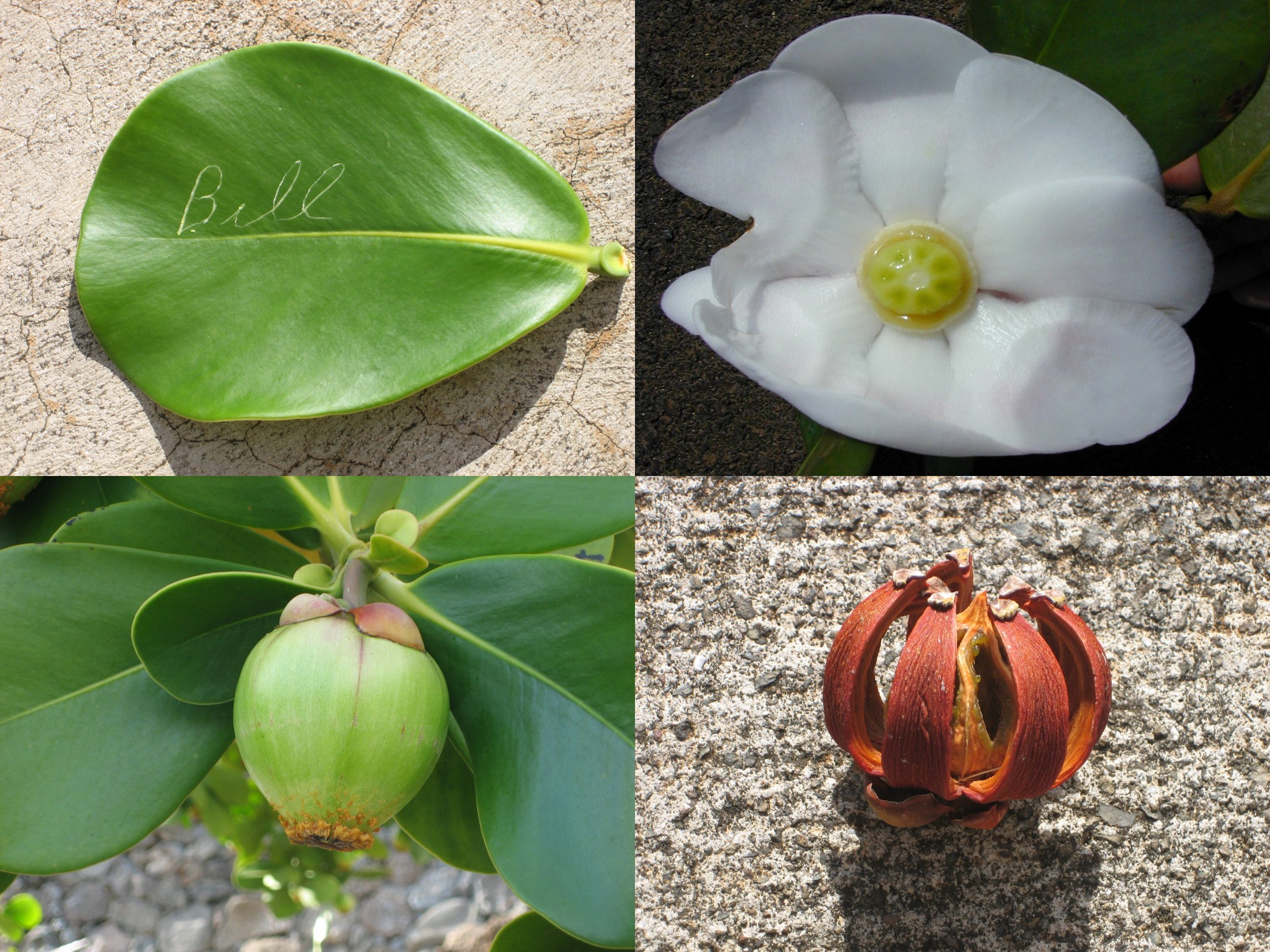
Autograph tree (C. rosea): leaf with autograph, flower, fresh fruit, and dried fruit.

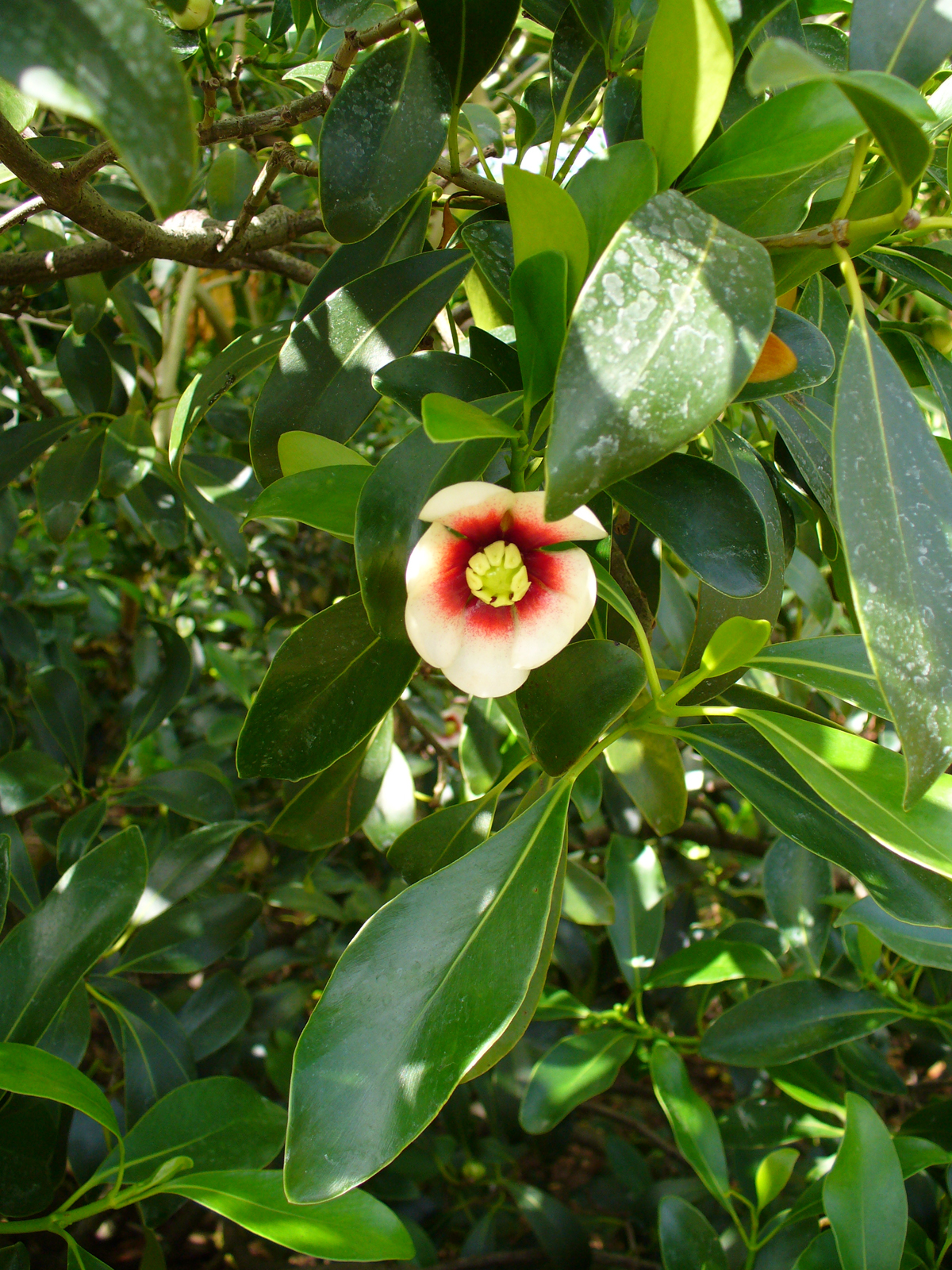
Clusia lanceolata, Fairchild Tropical Botanic Garden

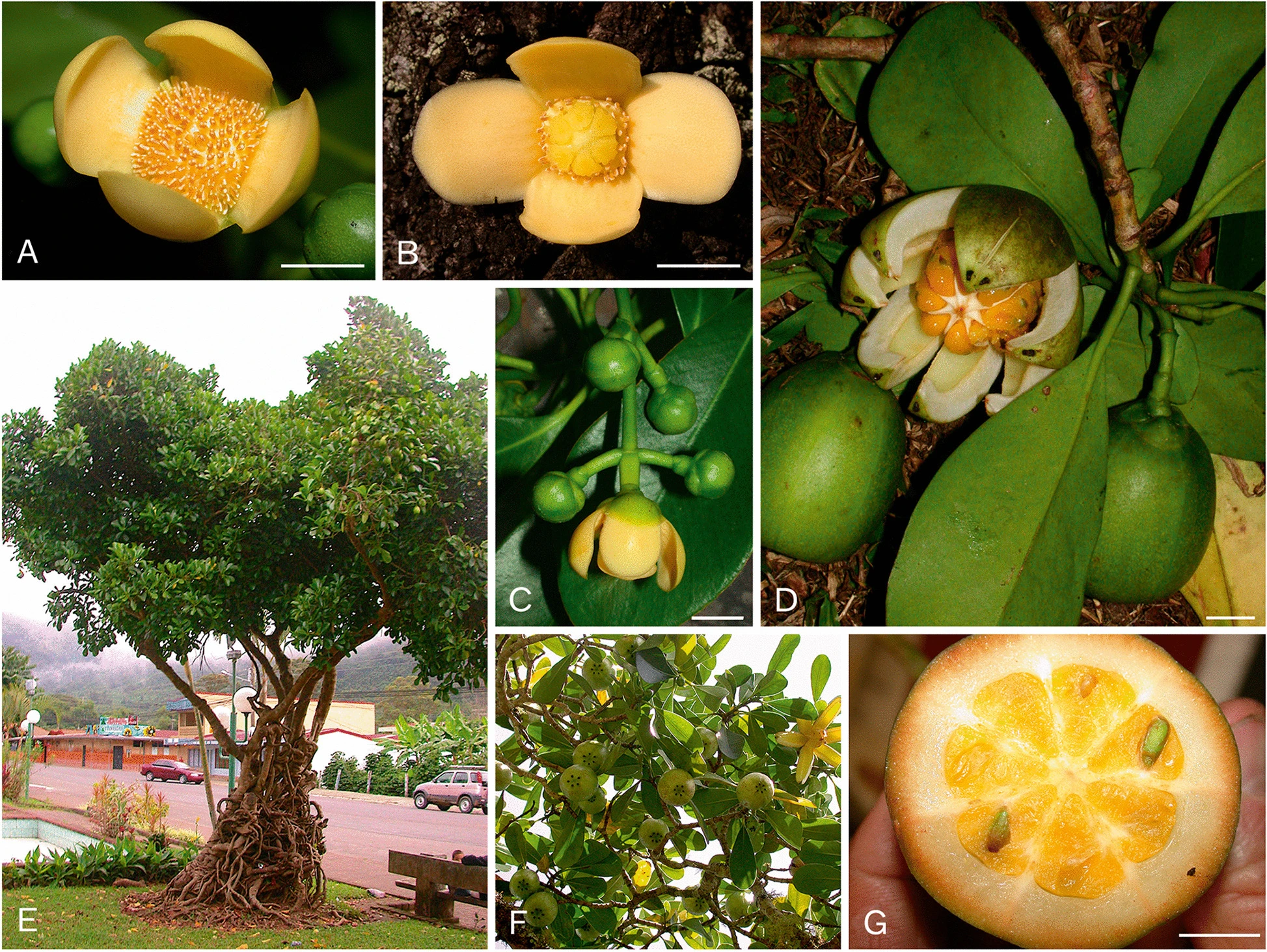
Clusia dotana, Costa Rica
