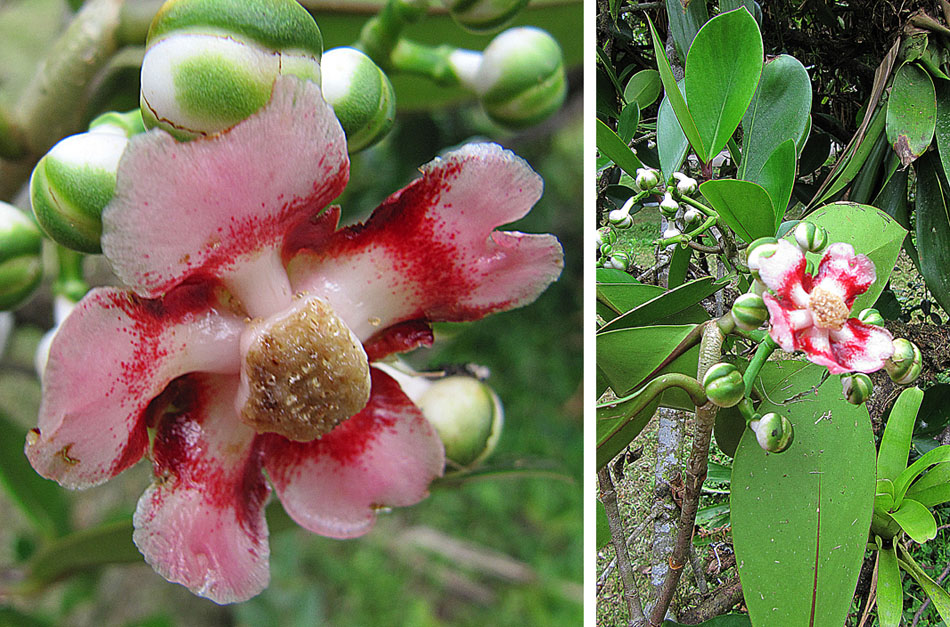
- Flowers of Clusia croatii

Conservation status
- Least Concern (IUCN 3.1)

Scientific classification
- Kingdom: Plantae
- Clade: Tracheophytes
- Clade: Angiosperms
- Clade: Eudicots
- Clade: Rosids
- Order: Malpighiales
- Family: Clusiaceae
- Genus: Clusia
- Species: C. croatii

Binomial name
- Clusia croatii D'Arcy

= Clusia croatii =

Species of flowering plant

Clusia croatii is a species of flowering plant in the family Clusiaceae. It is a shrub native to Costa Rica, Nicaragua, and Panama. It is threatened by habitat loss.

== Description ==
Clusia croatii is an epiphytic shrub that grows 3–10 m tall. It has milky sap which becomes orange when exposed to air. The leaves are opposite, and are 7–14 cm long and 3–7 cm wide. The leaves are elliptic, thick, and fleshy. The flowers are white to pink and red, with four to seven petals and four sepals. Clusia croatii has completely fused outer sepals which have to split open to expose the flower inside. The fruits are dark red, 1.5-3.5 cm large.

Clusia croatii blooms and fruits year round.
