= Clusia skotaster =

Conservation status
- Critically endangered, possibly extinct in the wild (IUCN 3.1)

Scientific classification
- Kingdom: Plantae
- Clade: Tracheophytes
- Clade: Angiosperms
- Clade: Eudicots
- Clade: Rosids
- Order: Malpighiales
- Family: Clusiaceae
- Genus: Clusia
- Species: C. skotaster

Binomial name
- Clusia skotaster Gilli

Species of flowering plant

Clusia skotaster is a species of flowering plant in the family Clusiaceae. It is found only in Cotopaxi Province of Ecuador. Its natural habitat is tropical montane rain forest from 1,500 to 2,000 metres (4,920 to 6,560 ft) elevation.
