= Clusia minutiflora =

Conservation status
- Data Deficient (IUCN 3.1)

Scientific classification
- Kingdom: Plantae
- Clade: Tracheophytes
- Clade: Angiosperms
- Clade: Eudicots
- Clade: Rosids
- Order: Malpighiales
- Family: Clusiaceae
- Genus: Clusia
- Species: C. minutiflora

Binomial name
- Clusia minutiflora Diels

Species of flowering plant

Clusia minutiflora is a species of flowering plant in the family Clusiaceae. It is found only in Ecuador. Its natural habitat is subtropical or tropical moist montane forest.
