= Clusia clarendonensis =

Conservation status
- Vulnerable (IUCN 2.3)

Scientific classification
- Kingdom: Plantae
- Clade: Tracheophytes
- Clade: Angiosperms
- Clade: Eudicots
- Clade: Rosids
- Order: Malpighiales
- Family: Clusiaceae
- Genus: Clusia
- Species: C. clarendonensis

Binomial name
- Clusia clarendonensis Britton

Species of flowering plant

Clusia clarendonensis is a species of flowering plant in the family Clusiaceae. It is found only in Jamaica.
