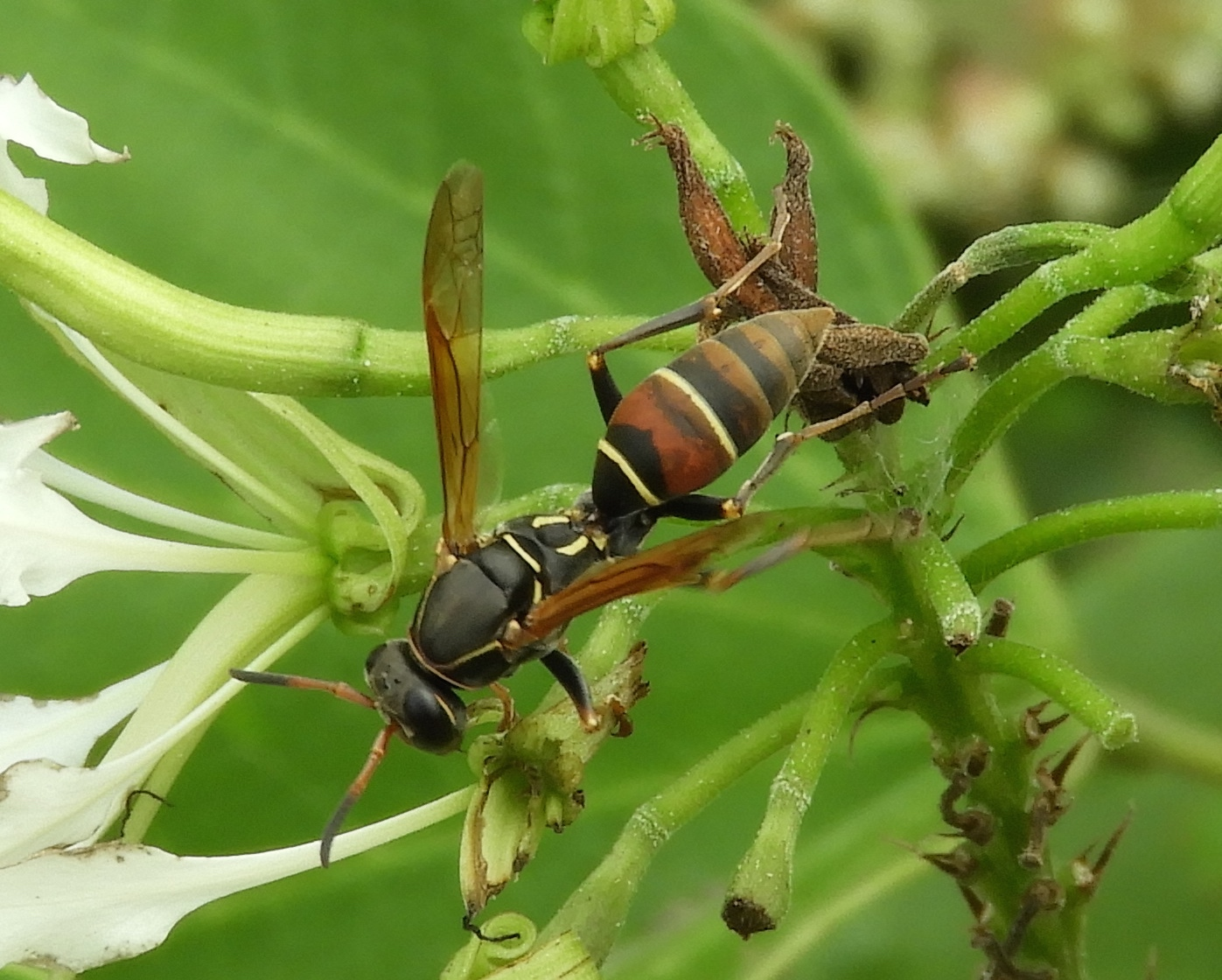

Scientific classification
- Kingdom: Animalia
- Phylum: Arthropoda
- Clade: Pancrustacea
- Class: Insecta
- Order: Hymenoptera
- Family: Vespidae
- Subfamily: Polistinae
- Tribe: Polistini
- Genus: Polistes
- Species: P. pacificus

Binomial name
- Polistes pacificus (Fabricius, 1804)

Synonyms
- Polistes flavopictus Ducke, 1918; Polistes liliaceusculus Saussure, 1855; Polistes liliaciosus Saussure, 1855; Polistes modestus Smith, 1862; Polistes trinitatis Bequard, 1937

= Polistes pacificus =

Species of wasp

Polistes pacificus is a Neotropical species of social paper wasp belonging to the subfamily Polistinae and the family Vespidae. P. pacificus can be found distributed throughout most of Central and South America and parts of southern North America. First discovered by Johan Christian Fabricius in 1804, P. pacificus is much darker in color than some other more recognizable Polistes wasps, and is one of the insects commonly eaten by several indigenous groups in Venezuela and Colombia.

== Taxonomy and phylogenetics ==
=== Phylogenetic tree ===
P. pacificus is part of a monophyletic clade that makes up the membership of Richards’ (1973, 1978) subgenera Epicnemius. P. pacificus is most closely related to its sister species, P. cinerascens. Although previous studies found Epicnemius to be paraphyletic, the most recent and complete study done by Picket et al. reveals that it is likely monophyletic. The species included in this clade are P. cinerascens, P. pacificus, P. geminatus geminatus, P. occipitalis, P. testaceicolor.

=== Synonyms ===
P. pacificus was originally discovered in 1804 by the famous Danish entomologist, Johan Christian Fabricius (1745–1808). However, because P. pacificus has wide color variation depending on its geographic region, over time it has been mistaken for several new species and given new names. These names included P. flavipictus Ducke, 1918 P. liliaceusculus de Saussure, 1854, P. liliaciosus de Saussure, 1855, P. modestus Smith, 1862, P. trinitatis Bequard, 1937. These names are relatively obsolete, but may appear in erroneous or outdated literature.

== Description and identification ==
=== Distinguishing P. pacificus from similar species ===
P. pacificus has varied coloration patterns with markings that can be black, ferruginous and yellow. It is darker and less brightly colored than most other Polistes species, and it is morphologically very similar to P. boharti. In fact, the two species are classified as the same under Richard's key. However, there are some distinguishing characteristics between the two: Firstly, the digitus structure of the genitalia of P. pacificus males has many dark, stout, distally curved or hooked setae. Secondly, female P. pacificus will have a genal ridge that is usually weak below, and rarely reaches below the level of the lower one-fifth to one-fourth of the eye; on the rare occasions that it extends below this level, it will most likely not reach the base of the mandible and will be very weak. Additionally, in P. pacificus, the lobate humeral angle is not defined, and the lower lateral extension of the pronotal ridge will not be depressed.

=== The defined morphological criteria ===
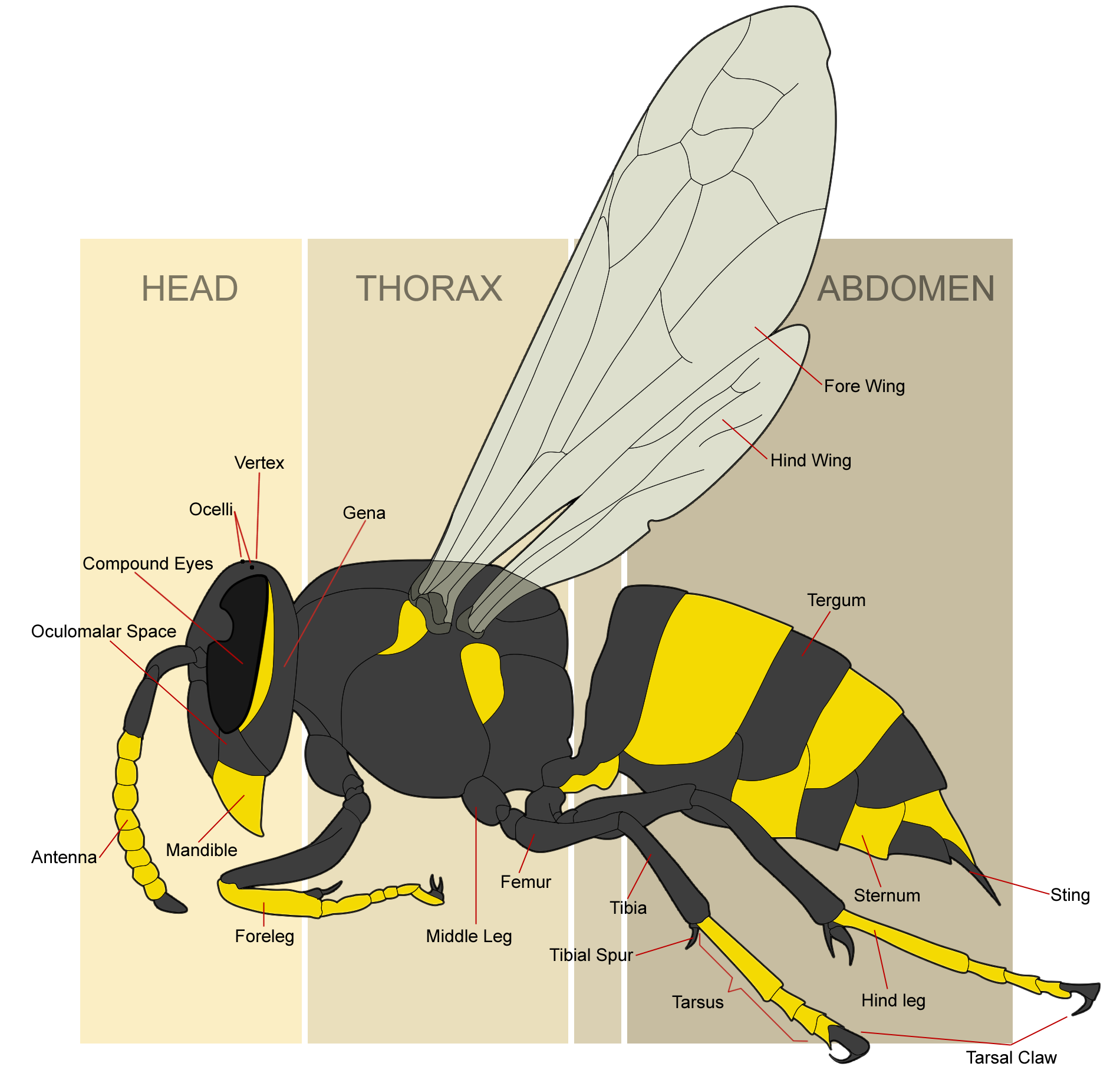
Wasp morphology

A specimen of P. pacificus may also be identified by the following morphological criteria:

Front of insect head diagram

- Male antennae are hooked
- Clypeus is pointed (see diagram)
- Male eyes touch the clypeus (see diagram)
- There is much pigmentation on the head
- Claws are symmetrical
- There are two teeth, nearly equal in size, that are present in the mandible
- Setae on the underside of the thoracic segment are minute or short, while setae on the underside of the abdominal segment are long and hairy.

=== Nest identification ===
P. pacificus builds nests that are relatively small and made of paper. These nests are most likely to be found in areas of low second-growth vegetation, and are often sheltered by large leaves. The nests, which hang from a plant supported by one or more pedicels, are made up of a single comb of hexagonal cells and do not have an envelope. Polistes produce the water-resistant paper used to make nests by gathering wood fiber and other plant matter and combining it with saliva.

== Distribution and habitat ==
=== Geographic distribution ===
P. pacificus can be found from the southern United States to Uruguay and Argentina. P. pacificus can be found in Southern parts of Texas, various areas of Mexico, Guatemala, Honduras, Nicaragua, Costa Rica, Panama, Colombia, Ecuador, Peru, Venezuela, Trinidad, Guyana, Suriname, French Guiana, parts of Brazil, Paraguay, Bolivia, and Uruguay.

=== Nest-building habitats ===
P. pacificus builds its nest on plants, using large leaves of the host plants as shelter. While some reports have been made that suggest that social paper wasps build nests where arboreal ants are also present, P. pacificus is only rarely associated with arboreal ants and frequently chooses nesting sites on plants that are unattractive to ants. Some of the most common plants for P. pacificus to build nests on are Clusia grandiflora and Vismia sessilifolia, but they have also been known to build nests that connect to long, thin thorns under the leaves on juvenile Astrocaryum sciophylum palm trees.

== Colony cycle ==
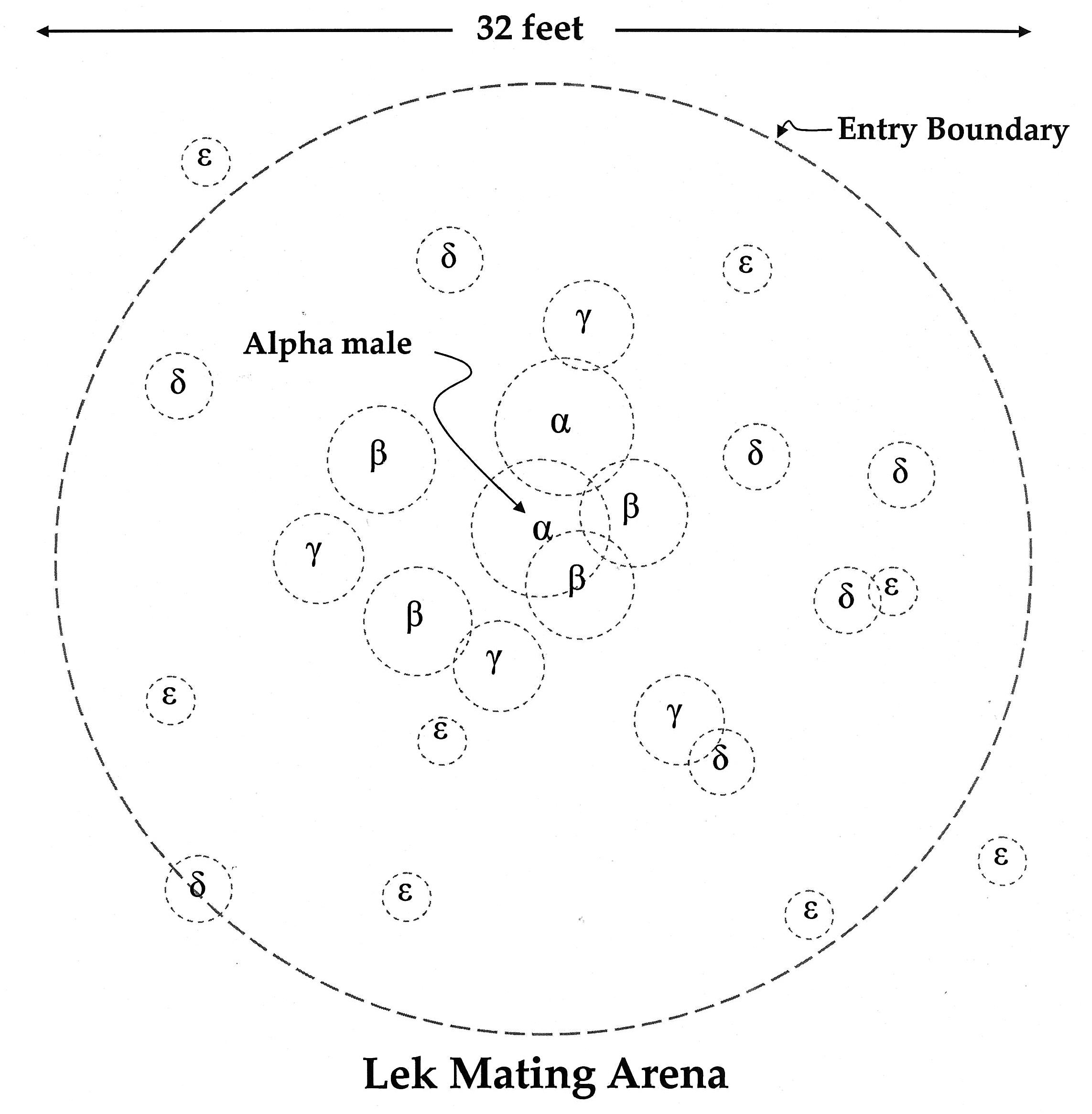
Lek diagram for mating

P. pacificus is one of several social paper wasp species that migrate seasonally depending on the times of the wet and dry seasons. In areas with less pronounced dry seasons, P. pacificus is more likely to brood continuously. However, when P. pacificus live in regions with a defined dry season, the dry season is the non-nesting phase of the colony cycle. During this period, wasps leave the low elevation habitats in which they normally nest and reproduce during the rainy season, and move to cooler areas at higher elevation. The aggregating wasps are sometimes found to be in small groups of individuals from different nests. Due to the fact that dry season aggregates of P. pacificus have been found in evergreen old growth forests, a place distinct from where they nest, it has been suggested that this behavior is evidence of altitudinal migration. The benefits to this type of seasonal migration could be that wasps in these cooler high elevation conditions have lower metabolic needs and costs. This behavior is similar to migrating behavior observed in temperate zone Polistes wasps during winter. Mating can occur either at leks away from nests or at newly founded nests, often late in the nesting season, but before the seasonal dormancy. Generally the inseminated females will pass the dormant season hibernating in a group of other females in a type of shelter, and at this time males most likely die off.

== Interactions with other species ==
=== Diet ===
The Polistes have high nutritional demands because they nurse their broods. P. pacificus is an animal of prey, but it is also a flower-visiting wasp that gets carbohydrates from flower nectar. When P. pacificus is in the larval state, the majority of its diet comes from animal protein. In addition to the caterpillars which Polistes mostly preys on, the P. pacificus also visits flowers, thus picking up carbohydrates. Carbohydrates collected through flower nectar are a complement of its diet and thought to help maintain its own energy metabolism.

=== Predators ===
P. pacificus has at least several known predators: arboreal ants and vertebrates, including humans. The larvae of the P. pacificus is what predators eat, as it is localized within the nest and immobile. The larvae makes a very valuable food source because it is rich in amino acids and fats.

=== Defense ===
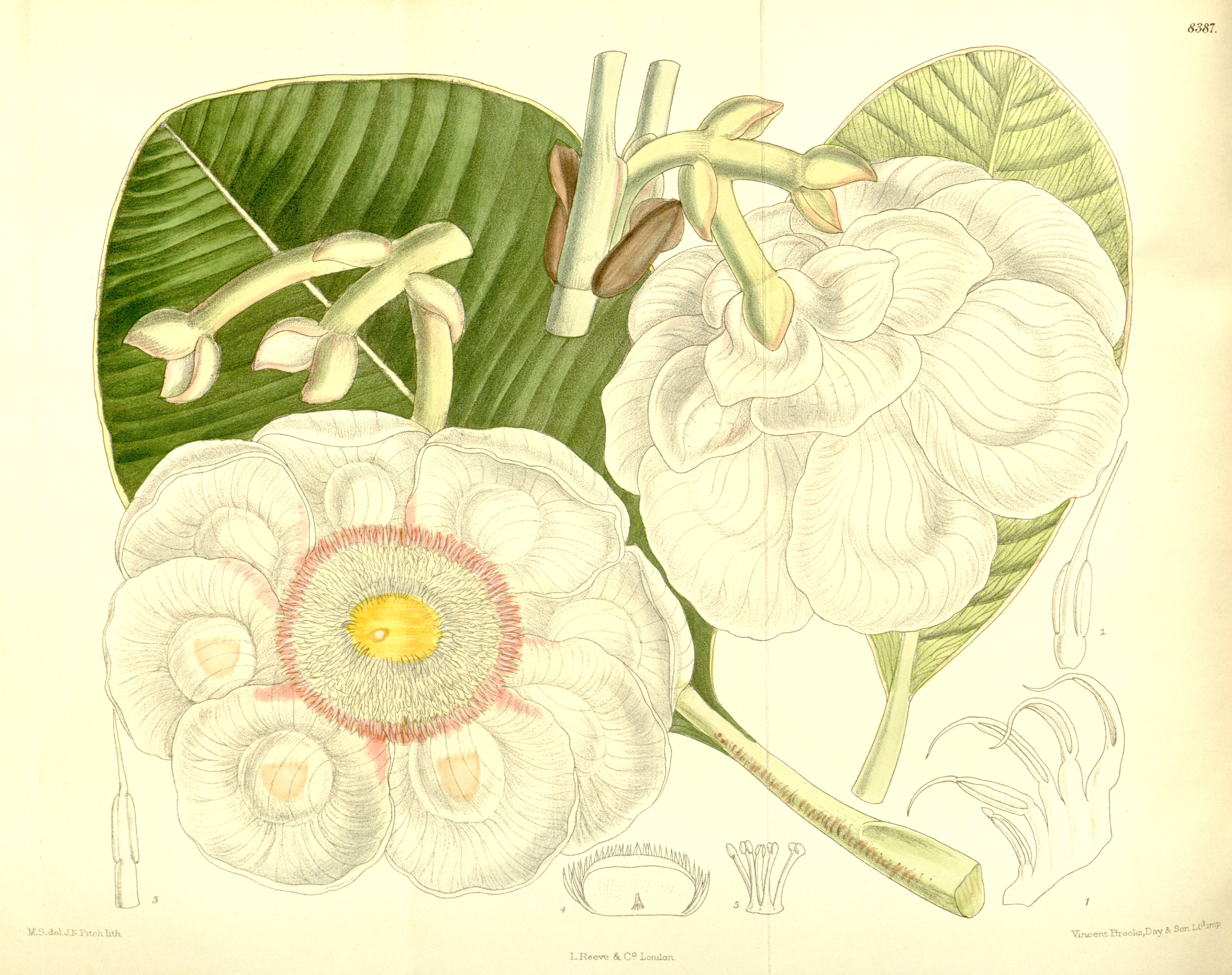
Clusia grandiflora, the tree on which P. pacificus often constructs nests because it is not appealing to predators.

P. pacificus nest site selection and structure have evolved under selective pressures of weather and predation. In order to keep predators out, P. pacificus nests are built in specific places in which they are less susceptible to attack by arboreal ants or vertebrates. The placement of the nest not only aims to reduce predation, but also to provide protection from extreme weather. Nests are most often built on the underside of large leaves, which protect against weather and limit predator's views of the nest from above. The most preferable large leaves have spines along the central vein, which act as a pedicel and protect the nests from ant attacks. In the neotropics, P. pacificus nests are most closely associated with a specific plant, the Clusia grandiflora, which is most likely an adaptation due to the selective pressure of ant predation as Clusia is not an attractive host for arboreal ant nests.

== Communication ==
=== Lack of visual signaling ===
Communication is a critical for any species and can benefit both the sender and receiver of information. Some wasps have high visual acuity and use recognition of facial patterns to establish dominance hierarchies; however, P. pacificus differs from these species in that it does not use visual signals, and must rely on other modes of communication. It is likely that P. polistes detects pheromones and other non-visual recognition cues to distinguish nestmates from nonnestmates and determine dominance.

=== Worker mouthing and rubbing ===
Adult female workers of P. pacificus have been observed to mouth and rub newly emerged female wasps, during which time the newly emerged wasps remain stationary. In several cases, the older worker used her gaster to rub the new wasp with discrete anterior to posterior strokes. In other cases, the older female has also been seen to mouth the young wasps with her mandibles, by opening and closing them over the new wasp's head, thorax and gaster. While in contact with the younger wasp, the older worker kept her sting chamber open. The workers that were observed executing this behavior had few, small, only partially developed eggs in their ovaries, and had shriveled Dufour's glands. Although it is unclear why exactly the wasps partook in this behavior, it is possible that doing so may give each of the newly emerged wasps the colony specific odor, which could ensure them safety when returning to the nest after foraging. It has also been hypothesized that this behavior may express some order of dominance.

== Human importance ==
=== Agriculture ===
P. pacificus, which gets some of its nutrition from flower nectar, is also a pollinator, and thus an important species for agriculture. In Mexico, P. pacificus has been observed to pollinate avocados, and it has been suggested that as a native species to the area P. pacificus started a coevolution with avocado species. Although P. pacificus is not as abundant as some of the other insects known to pollinate avocados, it nevertheless contributes to avocado pollination and production.

=== Human food source ===
Not only does P. pacificus help pollinate avocados, thus helping to provide a calorie-dense plant-based food source for humans, but it also is commonly hunted by humans who eat the wasp larvae. Although insect eating is often portrayed as an archaic trait, among the Yukpa-Yuko Indians of Venezuela and Colombia, insect food sources are still vitally important, as they supplement the Yukpa's diet by providing animal proteins and fats. The Yukpa word for P. pacificus is “nonawu,” and the Indians can recognize the nests as being low to the ground in second-growth vegetation. Although both women and men may participate in identifying nests, collecting the nests is exclusively men's work. When it comes time to harvest, the men wait until the sun is setting, then build a fire on the ground below where the nest is hanging. Using a hooked stick to detach the nest from its connection site, the nest is detached from the plant and immediately placed in the fire. Once in the fire, the adult insects evacuate as quickly as possible while the larvae die as they are toasted. The combs with the toasted larvae inside are then removed from the fire and brought home. The larvae can be considered celebratory food, and when a boy is newly born it is the father's duty to collect a nest alone.

=== Cultural significance of wasp stings ===
Several tribes from the Amazon basin collected P. pacificus, along with other Polistes wasps, to use their stings as instruments of pain during cultural rights of passage. For example, the Oyana people in Surinam constructed breastplates that were made of woven plant stems, in which live wasps were trapped. During initiation ceremonies, young boys would have to wear the breast plate all night, enduring the pain of continual wasp stings. This would have been especially painful because wasps are able to retract their stings and repeatedly insert them with new venom multiple times.
