= Clusia aequatoriensis =

Conservation status
- Critically Endangered (IUCN 3.1)

Scientific classification
- Kingdom: Plantae
- Clade: Embryophytes
- Clade: Tracheophytes
- Clade: Angiosperms
- Clade: Eudicots
- Clade: Rosids
- Order: Malpighiales
- Family: Clusiaceae
- Genus: Clusia
- Species: C. aequatoriensis

Binomial name
- Clusia aequatoriensis (Benoist) L.Marinho & A.Caro

Synonyms
- Tovomita aequatoriensis Benoist

Species of flowering plant

Clusia aequatoriensis is a species of flowering plant in the family Clusiaceae. It is found only in Ecuador. Its natural habitat is subtropical or tropical moist lowland forest. The only threat known so far is habitat destruction.

The species was first described as Tovomita aequatoriensis by Raymond Benoist in 1933. In 2024 Lucas Cardoso Marinho and Angy V. Caro-Sánchez placed the species in genus Clusia as C. aequatoriensis.
