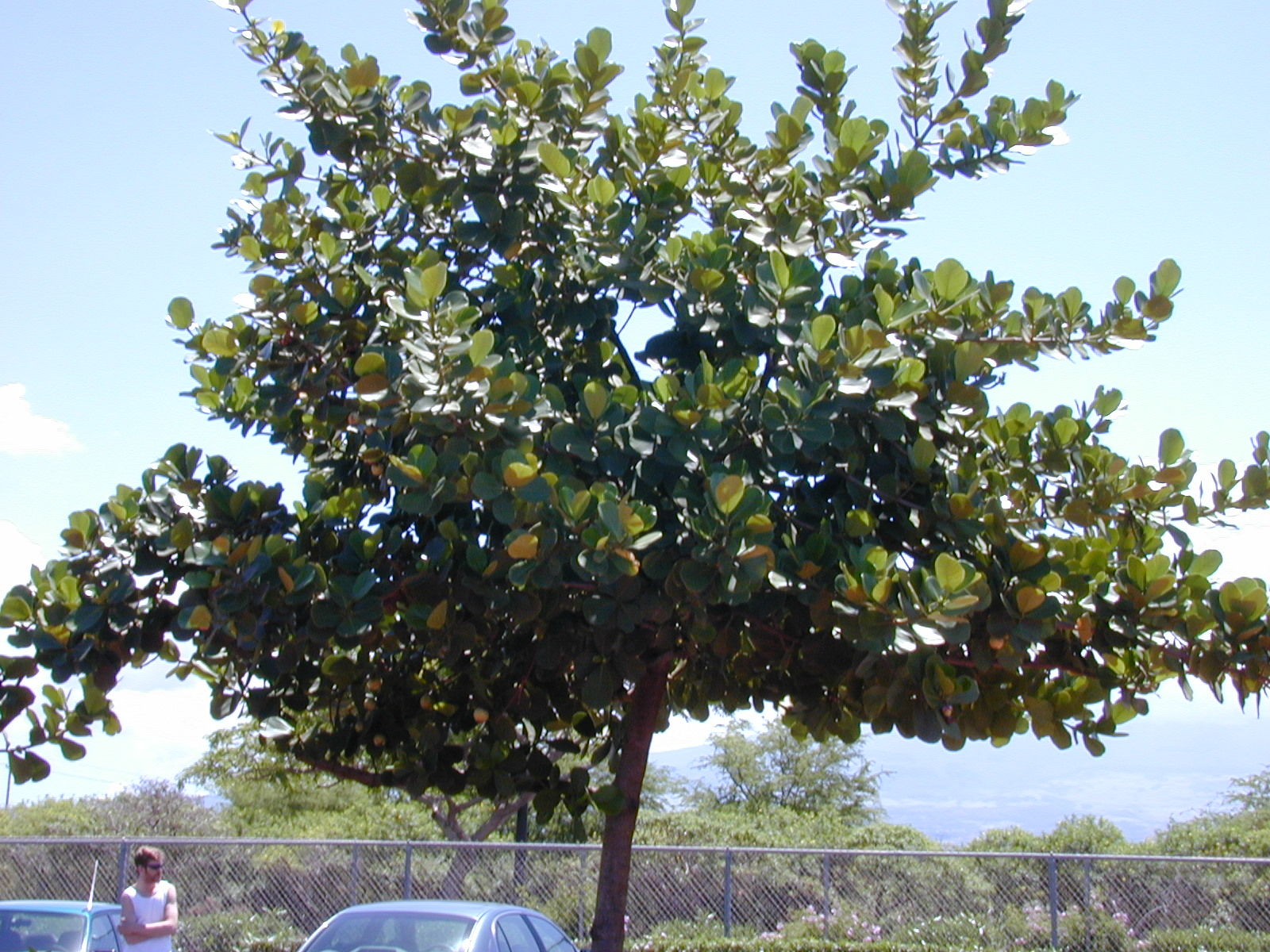

Conservation status
- Least Concern (IUCN 3.1)

Scientific classification
- Kingdom: Plantae
- Clade: Embryophytes
- Clade: Tracheophytes
- Clade: Angiosperms
- Clade: Eudicots
- Clade: Rosids
- Order: Malpighiales
- Family: Clusiaceae
- Genus: Clusia
- Species: C. rosea

Binomial name
- Clusia rosea Jacq. (1760)

Synonyms
- Clusia retusa Poir.; Clusia silvicola Britton; Elwertia retusa Raf.; Firkea rosea (Jacq.) Raf.

= Clusia rosea =

Species of flowering plant

Clusia rosea, the autograph tree, copey, cupey, balsam apple, pitch-apple, and Scotch attorney, is an evergreen, tropical and sub-tropical flowering plant species in the family Clusiaceae. The name Clusia major is sometimes misapplied to this species.

== Description ==
Clusia rosea is a tree native to the Caribbean, including the Bahamas, Hispaniola (such as in Los Haitises National Park), Cuba, and Puerto Rico, and to Florida, southern Mexico, Central America, and northern South America from Ecuador to Colombia, Venezuela, and the Guianas.

It is a hemiepiphyte; that is, it grows as an epiphyte on rocks or other trees at the start of its life and behaving like a strangler fig as it gets larger. Like a strangler fig, it successfully competes for light by outgrowing, overtopping and "strangling" its host tree with its many aerial roots. These roots are among the fastest growing known; up to 30 cm (12 in) in 24 hours.

The petals are pink to white. The thin upper leaf tissue registers 'writing' giving it the common name "autograph tree". The tree produces a fleshy, light green toxic fruit; once the fruit splits, the seeds are consumed by birds and other wildlife. Clusia species are normally dioecious, but in C. rosea, there are pistillate (female) individuals only, and seeds are formed through agamospermy.

== Cultivation ==
This plant is cultivated as an ornamental plant, for its flowers, foliage, and fruit. It is planted in gardens as a fruiting and ornamental tree in sub-tropical climates, and used as a houseplant in many climates.

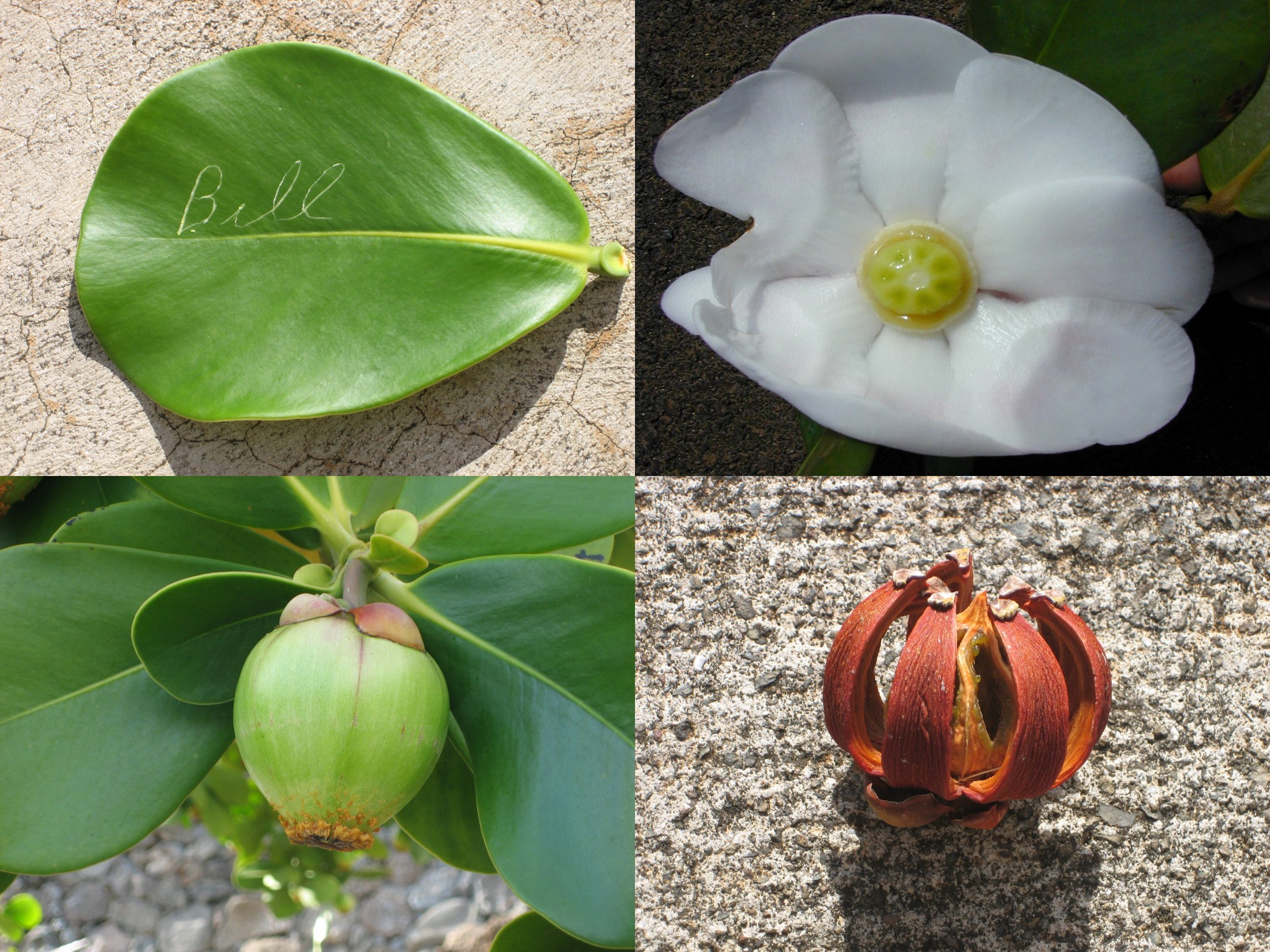
Clusia rosea (clockwise from top left): an autographed leaf, a flower, dried fruit, and fresh fruit

== Invasiveness ==
Clusia rosea has become a great threat to Sri Lanka, Hawaii, and many other tropical countries as an invasive plant.

In Sri Lanka it is spreading rapidly on the mountains of the central hill country. It especially grows on rocks and rock outcrops where it forms dense thickets. Being a hemiepiphyte that resembles a strangling fig, it also sprouts on branches and trunks of native trees and rapidly overgrows and strangles them. It therefore poses a great threat to what little remains of the native submontane forests, and the unique native vegetation around rock outcrops, such as on the Hantana mountain range near Kandy. It is known as Gal Goraka (ගල් ගොරක) or Gal Idda (ගල් ඉද්ද) in Sinhalese.

It is one of Hawaii's most invasive plants and grows in forests and open, disturbed areas in low elevations. It is spread by birds which eat its fruits.

Clusia rosea is highly tolerant to extreme environments such as excessive salty winds and sprays and drought.

== Uses ==
The leaves were used to make playing cards in the West Indies. Some sign their autographs on the leaves and watch them grow.

In Puerto Rico, in the past, parts of the plant were used to make game balls, to make tar and for firewood.
