= Clusia portlandiana =

Conservation status
- Vulnerable (IUCN 2.3)

Scientific classification
- Kingdom: Plantae
- Clade: Tracheophytes
- Clade: Angiosperms
- Clade: Eudicots
- Clade: Rosids
- Order: Malpighiales
- Family: Clusiaceae
- Genus: Clusia
- Species: C. portlandiana

Binomial name
- Clusia portlandiana Howard & Proctor

Species of flowering plant

Clusia portlandiana is a species of flowering plant in the family Clusiaceae. It is a shrub or tree found only in Jamaica. It is threatened by habitat loss.
