= Clusia dickinsoniana =

Scientific classification
- Kingdom: Plantae
- Clade: Embryophytes
- Clade: Tracheophytes
- Clade: Spermatophytes
- Clade: Angiosperms
- Clade: Eudicots
- Clade: Rosids
- Order: Malpighiales
- Family: Clusiaceae
- Genus: Clusia
- Species: C. dickinsoniana

Binomial name
- Clusia dickinsoniana J.E.Nascim.

Species of tree

Clusia dickinsoniana is a species of plant in the family Clusiaceae. C. dickinsoniana is a tree or epiphyte, which produces cream or brown flowers. The species is native to Venezuela, and was named after the singer Bruce Dickinson.

== Distribution ==
Clusia dickinsoniana is native to the wet tropical biome of Venezuela. The species is known only from the type material, which was collected from the Pacaraima Mountains, on the Brazil-Venezuela border.

== Taxonomy ==
Clusia dickinsoniana was described in 2019, from specimens collected in 1973 by Julian Alfred Steyermark. The species is included in the Oedematopus section of the genus Clusia.

== Description ==
Clusia dickinsoniana is a tree that spends part of its life cycle as an epiphyte. The leaves are leathery and tough, and elliptical in shape. The leaves are 5–8 centimetres (2.0–3.1 in) long and 1.5–3 centimetres (0.59–1.18 in) wide, and have brown glands on the lower surace. The leaf stems are 8–15 millimetres (0.31–0.59 in) long. The tree produces a white exudate.

The plant's inflorescences have twenty to thirty flowers each. The inflorescences grow on 2–5 millimetres (0.079–0.197 in) long stalks. The flowers have three or four petals, which are cream to brown in colour. The plant flowers in May.

Clusia dickinsoniana is similar to Clusia octandra, though the former has more stamens.

== Etymology ==
Clusia dickinsoniana is named after Bruce Dickinson, singer of the band Iron Maiden.
