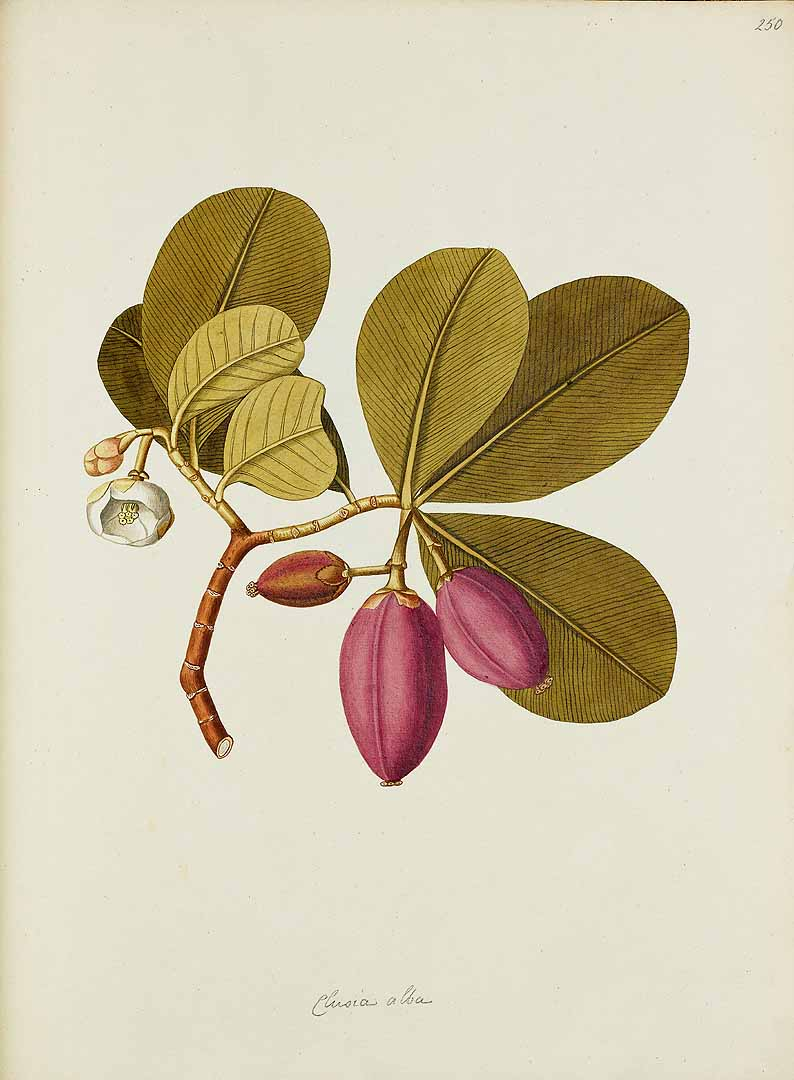

Scientific classification
- Kingdom: Plantae
- Clade: Tracheophytes
- Clade: Angiosperms
- Clade: Eudicots
- Clade: Rosids
- Order: Malpighiales
- Family: Clusiaceae
- Genus: Clusia
- Species: C. major

Binomial name
- Clusia major L.

Synonyms
- Birolia alba Raf.; Clusia alba Jacq.

= Clusia major =

Species of tree

Clusia major is a tropical plant species in the genus Clusia. The name Clusia major is sometimes misapplied to the more widely distributed species Clusia rosea, which, however has petiolate (versus virtually sessile), very dark (versus bright) green leaves that are widest just below the apex (versus near the middle), and 8 (versus 5) stigmas. Fruits of C. rosea are about as long as wide (versus noticeably longer than wide in C. major).

== Distribution ==
Clusia major occurs in the Lesser Antilles.
