= San Carlos de Río Negro =

- City
- Location in Venezuela
- Coordinates: 01°55′12″N 67°03′40″W
- Country: Venezuela
- State: Amazonas State
- Municipality: Río Negro Municipality
- Founded: 1759
- Elevation: 65 m (213 ft)

Population
  - Total: 1,200
  - Demonym: San Carleño/a
- Time zone: UTC-04:00 (VET)
- Area code: 0248
- Climate: Af

San Carlos de Río Negro is a city in Venezuela's Amazonas State, serving as the administrative capital of the municipal district of Río Negro. It is inhabited primarily by Amerindian people, in particular the Yanomami and Baniwa (Kurripako) peoples. It sits on the opposite side of the Rio Negro from the Colombian city of San Felipe. The city has approximately 1,200 inhabitants.

== History ==
The city of San Carlos de Río Negro was founded in 1759 as a camp set up by the expedition captained by José Solano y Bote. The expedition moved into the area to explore the extent of the limits of exploration as defined by the Treaty of Madrid between the Crowns of Portugal and Spain. José Solano y Bote set up his exploration base there on the banks of the Rio Negro with the few men that had survived the trek up the Orinoco River. Most of the men that accompanied the expedition, including the famous Swedish botanist Pehr Löfling, succumbed to tropical diseases, especially yellow fever.

In May 1800, the explorers Alexander von Humboldt and Aimé Bonpland visited the town, constituting the southernmost point of their expedition of the Amazon basin.

== Geography ==
The city is located a few kilometers from the mouth of the Casiquiare canal, an important fluvial artery that connects the Amazon Basin with the Orinoco River, thus uniting Venezuela, Colombia and Brazil, and is 65 metres (213 ft) above sea level. About 80 kilometres (50 mi) south of the city is a rocky formation called Piedra del Cocuy, an excellent climbing place in one of the most bio-diverse areas on Earth.

=== Travel ===
Because of its remote location, there are few ways to get into and out of the city. There is only one small road that connect the city to the small fluvial port in the nearby town of Solano, located on the banks of the Casiquiare. The city can also be reached by air taxis and private plane.

=== Climate ===
The climate is tropical rainforest (Köppen Af), with an annual median temperature of 26.3 °C (79.3 °F) and a median precipitation of 3,430 millimetres (135 in)/year.

Climate data for San Carlos de Río Negro
Month	Jan	Feb	Mar	Apr	May	Jun	Jul	Aug	Sep	Oct	Nov	Dec	Year
Mean daily maximum °C (°F)	31.4 (88.5)	31.6 (88.9)	31.8 (89.2)	30.7 (87.3)	30.2 (86.4)	29.6 (85.3)	29.6 (85.3)	30.7 (87.3)	31.7 (89.1)	31.6 (88.9)	31.7 (89.1)	31.3 (88.3)	31.0 (87.8)
Daily mean °C (°F)	26.5 (79.7)	26.6 (79.9)	26.8 (80.2)	26.1 (79.0)	25.8 (78.4)	25.7 (78.3)	25.5 (77.9)	26.1 (79.0)	26.6 (79.9)	26.8 (80.2)	26.7 (80.1)	26.5 (79.7)	26.3 (79.4)
Mean daily minimum °C (°F)	21.6 (70.9)	21.6 (70.9)	21.8 (71.2)	21.6 (70.9)	21.5 (70.7)	21.9 (71.4)	21.4 (70.5)	21.5 (70.7)	21.5 (70.7)	22.0 (71.6)	21.8 (71.2)	21.7 (71.1)	21.7 (71.0)
Average rainfall mm (inches)	215 (8.5)	198 (7.8)	276 (10.9)	313 (12.3)	398 (15.7)	394 (15.5)	360 (14.2)	310 (12.2)	270 (10.6)	249 (9.8)	220 (8.7)	227 (8.9)	3,430 (135.1)

== See also ==
- List of cities and towns in Venezuela
