= Río Negro Municipality =

Río Negro Municipality Municipio Río Negro
- Municipality
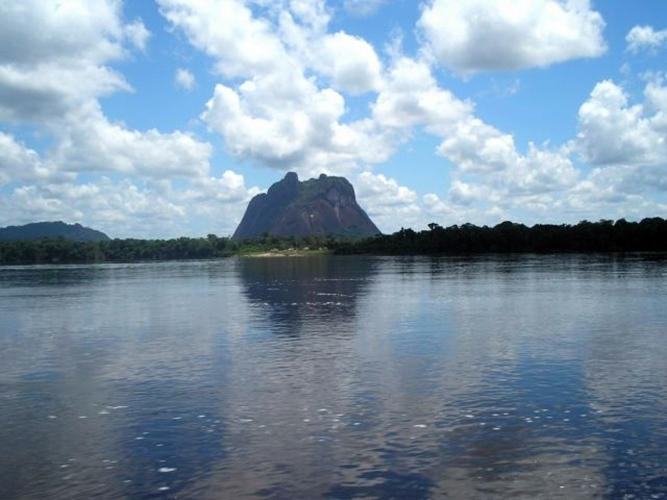

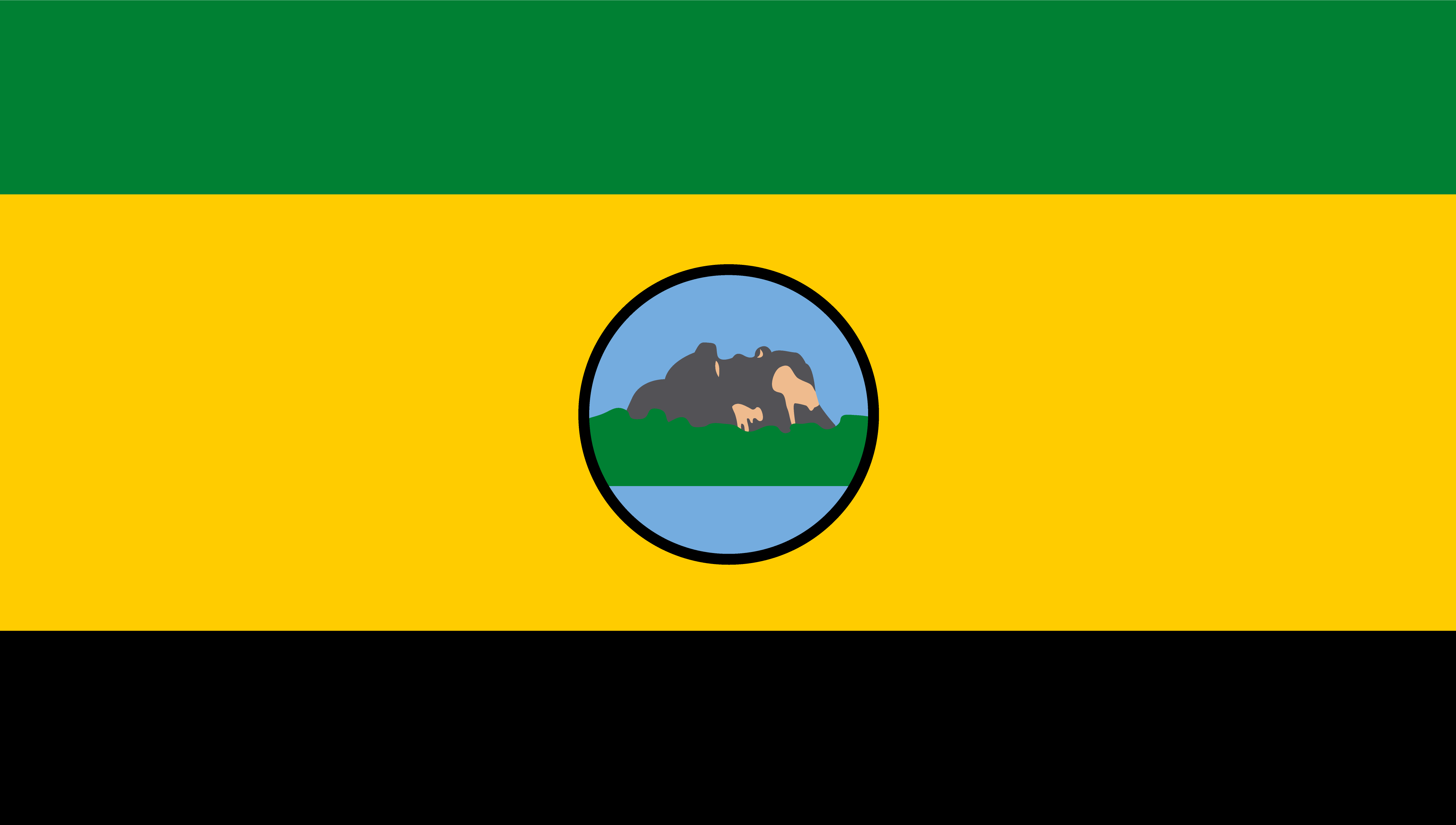
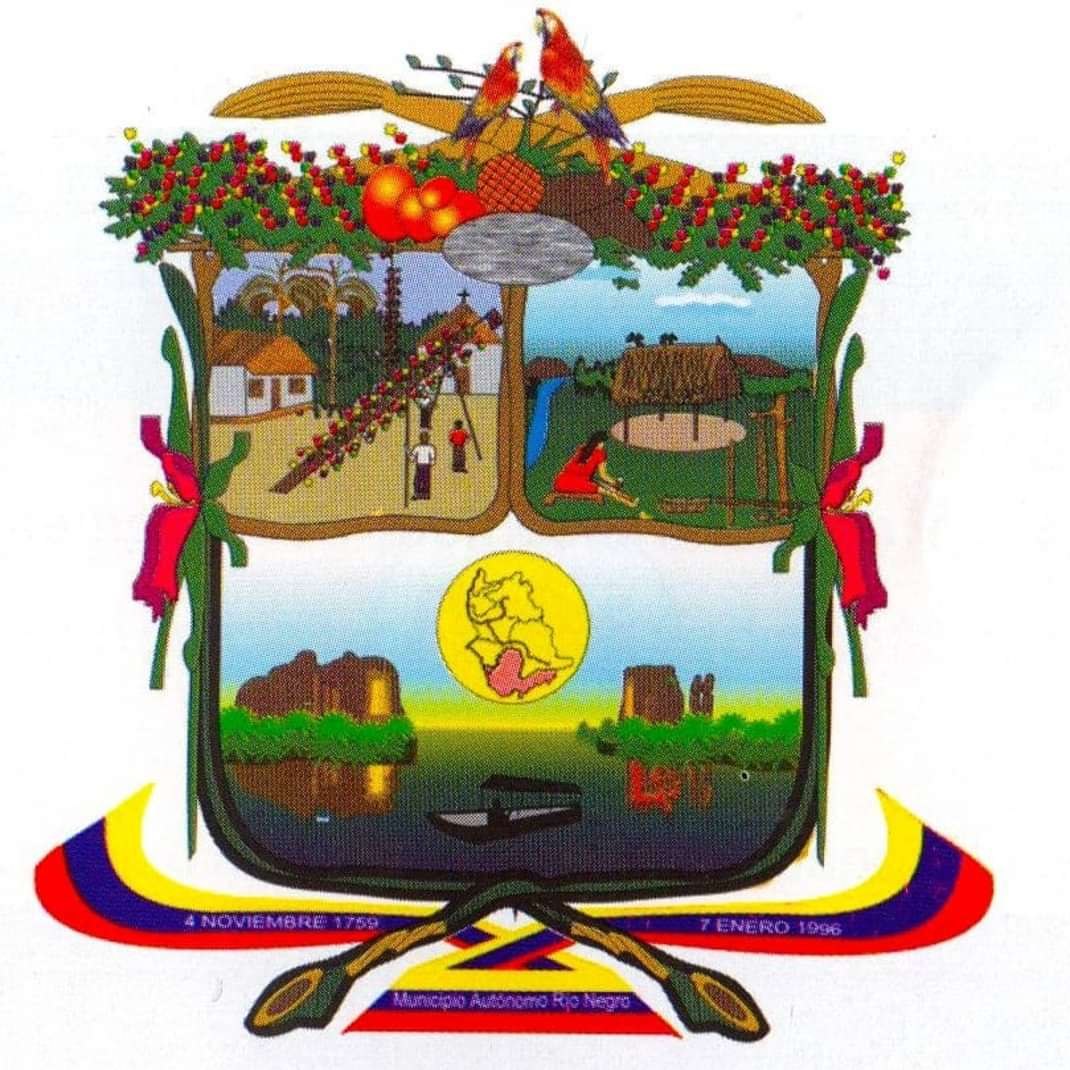
- Flag Coat of arms

- Location in Amazonas

- Location in Venezuela
- Coordinates: 1°44′33″N 65°35′09″W
- Country: Venezuela
- State: Amazonas
- Municipal seat: San Carlos de Río Negro

Government
  - Mayor: Christian Lossio Gavini (PODEMOS)

Area
  - Total: 39,380.0 km^{2} (15,204.7 sq mi)

Population (2011)
  - Total: 2,300
  - Density: 0.058/km^{2} (0.15/sq mi)
- Time zone: UTC−4 (VET)
- Area code(s): 0248
- Website: Official website

The Río Negro Municipality (Spanish: Municipio Río Negro) is one of the seven municipalities (municipios) that make up the southern Venezuelan state of Amazonas and, according to the 2011 census by the National Institute of Statistics of Venezuela, the municipality has a population of 2,300. The town of San Carlos de Río Negro is the shire town of the Río Negro Municipality.

== History ==
The town of San Carlos de Río Negro was founded in 1759 around a mounted camp by the expedition captained by José Solano that moved to that area in the extent of the works of exploration of the limits between the Crowns of Portugal and Spain requested by the Treaty of Madrid. José Solano set up his exploration base in that place, in the margins of the Rio Negro, and there he settled with the few men that had survived the ascent along the Orinoco River, since most, including the famous Swedish botanist Pehr Löfling that accompanied the expedition, they had succumbed prey of the tropical diseases, especially the yellow fever.

San Carlos de Río Negro was visited from May 7 to May 10, 1800, for the expedition of Alexander von Humboldt and Aimé Bonpland, constituting the most southern point of their (périplo) for the Amazon Basin.

== Demographics ==
The Río Negro Municipality, according to a 2007 population estimate by the National Institute of Statistics of Venezuela, has a population of 2,660 (up from 2,314 in 2000). This amounts to 1.9% of the state's population. The municipality's population density is 0.1 inhabitants per square kilometre (0.26/sq mi).

== Government ==
The mayor of the Río Negro Municipality is Luis Alirio Avaristo, elected on October 31, 2004, with 37% of the vote. Avaristo had been serving as the acting mayor of the Río Negro Municipality since August 13, 2002, following the resignation of Pedro Zerpa. The municipality is divided into four parishes; Capital Río Negro, Solano, Casiquiare, and Cocuy (previous to December 18, 1997, the Río Negro Municipality contained only a single parish).

== See also ==
- San Carlos de Río Negro
- Amazonas
- Municipalities of Venezuela
