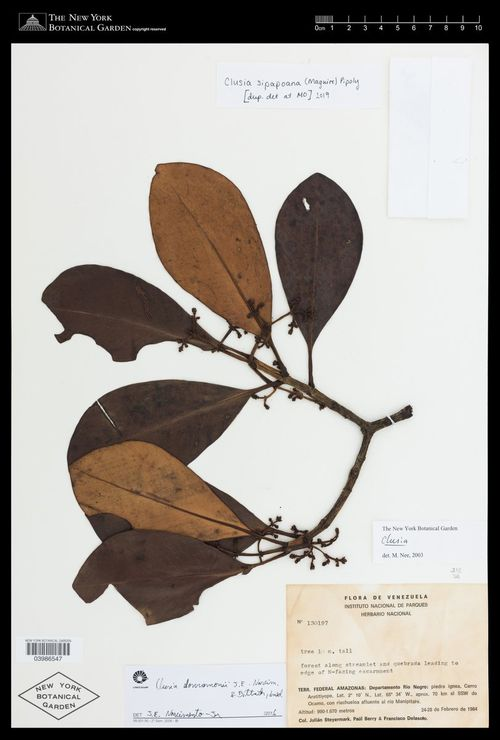

Scientific classification
- Kingdom: Plantae
- Clade: Tracheophytes
- Clade: Angiosperms
- Clade: Eudicots
- Clade: Rosids
- Order: Malpighiales
- Family: Clusiaceae
- Genus: Clusia
- Species: C. donramonii

Binomial name
- Clusia donramonii J.E.Nascim. & Bittrich

= Clusia donramonii =

Species of flowering plant

Clusia donramonii is a species of tree in the family Clusiaceae. The species is native to Venezuela. It was described in 2019, and named after the actor Ramón Valdés.

== Distribution ==
The species is native to the wet tropical biome of Venezuela. It is endemic to the Río Negro Municipality, Venezuela, and occurs on tepuis, at elevations from 1,000–1,600 metres (3,300–5,200 ft).

== Taxonomy ==
Clusia donramonii was first described in 2019. The type specimens were collected from the Río Negro Municipality, Venezuela, in 1984, at an elevation of 990–1,670 metres (3,250–5,480 ft). Within the genus Clusia, the species is assigned to the section Oedematopus.

Herbarium specimens of Clusia donramonii have also been identified as Clusia sipapoana, though the species differ in morphology.

== Description ==
Clusia donramonii is a tree that grows 3–10 metres (9.8–32.8 ft) high.

The leaves are tough and leathery in texture. They measure 7–17 centimetres (2.8–6.7 in) long, and 4–11 centimetres (1.6–4.3 in) wide. The leaves have brown glands on their undersides, and the edges of leaves are rolled downwards. The leaf stalks are 2–3.5 centimetres (0.79–1.38 in) long.

The flowers have four cream coloured petals, which fall away seasonally. The flower stalks are 2–4 millimetres (0.079–0.157 in) long. The inflorescences do not have stalks. The plant flowers in February.

The plant has smooth, elliptical fruits, which measure 1.8 centimetres (0.71 in) by 1.5 centimetres (0.59 in) in size. The plant fruits in February and March. The tree produces a white exudate.

Clusia donramonii is similar to Clusia asymmetrica and Clusia multilineata.

== Etymology ==
Clusia donramonii is named after the actor Ramón Valdés. The researchers who named the species noted Valdés' role as Don Ramón, in the show El Chavo del Ocho.
