= A Tree Grows in Brooklyn =

A Tree Grows in Brooklyn may refer to:

- A Tree Grows in Brooklyn (novel), 1943, by Betty Smith
- A Tree Grows in Brooklyn (1945 film), the cinema adaptation of the novel
- A Tree Grows in Brooklyn (musical), the stage adaptation of the novel
- A Tree Grows in Brooklyn (1974 film), a 1974 American television film based on the novel
