= Joy in the Morning =

Joy in the Morning may refer to:

- Joy in the Morning (Andrews novel), a 1919 novel by Mary Raymond Shipman Andrews
- Joy in the Morning (Wodehouse novel), a 1946 Jeeves novel by P.G. Wodehouse
- Joy in the Morning (Smith novel), a 1963 novel by Betty Smith
- Joy in the Morning (film), a 1965 film adaptation of Smith's novel, starring Richard Chamberlain
- Joy in the Morning (Kuncaitis novel), a 2006 novel by Amy Kuncaitis
- Joy in the Morning, a choral anthem by Natalie Sleeth
- Joy in the Morning, a 2022 album by Tauren Wells, or its title track
