= Betty Smith =

American playwright and novelist (1896–1972)

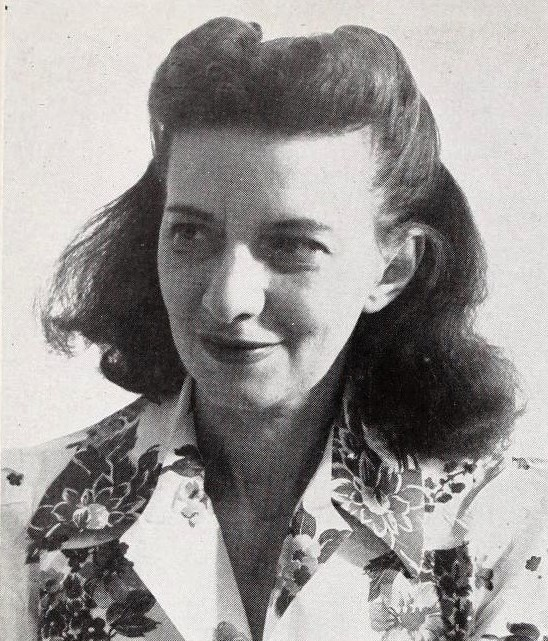
- Smith circa 1943
- Born: Elisabeth Lillian Wehner; December 15, 1896; New York City, U.S.
- Died: January 17, 1972 (aged 75); Shelton, Connecticut, U.S.
- Education: University of Michigan
- Occupation: Writer
- Writing career
- Notable work: A Tree Grows in Brooklyn

Betty Smith (born Elisabeth Lillian Wehner; December 15, 1896 – January 17, 1972) was an American playwright and novelist. She is best known for writing the 1943 novel A Tree Grows in Brooklyn.

== Early years ==
Smith was born Elisabeth Lillian Wehner on December 15, 1896, in the Williamsburg section of Brooklyn, New York to first-generation German-Americans John C. Wehner, a waiter, and Katherine (or Catherine) Hummel. She had a younger brother, William, and a younger sister, Regina. At the time of her birth, the family was living at 207 Ewen Street (now Manhattan Avenue). When she was four, they were living at 227 Stagg Street, and would move several times to various tenements on Montrose Avenue and Hopkins Street before settling in a tenement on the top floor of 702 Grand Street. It was the Grand Street tenement that served as the setting for A Tree Grows in Brooklyn.

Smith developed an early passion for the written word. At age eight, she received an A for a school composition. "I knew then," she was reported as saying, "that I would write a book one day." She made great use of the then-new public library near her home on Leonard Street, and at age 11, had two poems published in a school publication. Smith attended Public School 49 through fourth grade, then transferred to PS 18, which she disliked, before wrangling her way into out-of-district PS 23 in Greenpoint, Brooklyn, where she finished eighth grade. At this point in her life, at age 14, she was compelled by her mother to quit school and go to work to support the family. From 1910 to 1915, Smith worked a series of odd jobs, including a factory making tissue paper and at a clipping station, where she read more than 200 newspapers a day. At age 18, endeavoring to further her education, she discovered she could attend Girls' High School in Brooklyn during the day while continuing to work a night job in Manhattan. Smith also became editor of the school newspaper. But after two years of this rigorous schedule, she quit school because she received a well-paying day job with the United States Postal Service.

In her teenage years, Smith was an active member at the Jackson Street Settlement House, operated by the School Settlement Association. Offering a diverse range of after school social activities, the settlement house became one of Smith's favorite destinations. Of particular interest were classes in play writing, as well as acting and other theatrical activities. It was at the settlement house in 1917 that she met her future first husband, George H. E. Smith, the coach of her debate team and a fellow German-American, whose family name had been changed during WWI from Schmidt. Some claim that it was near the Jackson Street Settlement House, rather than near her apartment, that the tree grew which gave name to her best-known novel, but this assertion is unsubstantiated.

=== Marriage and motherhood ===
In 1919, after moving briefly to Richmond Hill, Queens, with her mother and stepfather, she joined George Smith in Ann Arbor, Michigan, where he pursued a law degree at the University of Michigan. They married October 18, 1919. During the couple's extended stay in Ann Arbor, Smith gave birth to two girls and then waited until they were in school before endeavoring to complete her education. Because she had only completed two years of high school, Smith first enrolled in Ann Arbor High School, even though the principal thought it "unusual for a married woman to be a high school junior but could find no law against it." However, once again she was not able to graduate due to her husband finding work in Belding, Michigan, and later Detroit.

Although George Smith's career was thriving, he found the practice of law unfulfilling. As a result, they decided to return to Ann Arbor and the University of Michigan to "start over," with George studying political science, with an aim toward a career in politics. Although she had not finished high school, the university allowed her to take classes as a special student without matriculating. Smith began to take her writing more seriously, realizing it could be a career. She honed her composition and journalism skills, submitting articles and recipes to newspapers as well as writing plays. Despite family money worries, instead of taking part-time jobs as she had before she continued with her writing endeavors.

In 1933, Betty and George Smith legally separated, and before the start of World War II, in 1938, they divorced. Although divorced, she continued to use the Smith surname throughout her writing career.

== Theater and playwriting ==
From a young age, Smith had a deep and abiding interest in stage theater. She and her younger brother Willie regularly attended Saturday matinees at Brooklyn theaters for ten cents each, which allowed them to stand in the gallery. In a later autobiographical statement, Smith noted:

In all the years of growing up, I saw at least one play a week. I ran errands, made childish sacrifices of penny candy, tended babies, brought back deposit bottles. I had one objective: To get together a dime a week to see the Saturday matinee at one of three Brooklyn stock companies in our neighborhood.

In 1916, Smith was able to attend one of Sarah Bernhardt's final performances during the latter’s farewell tour. Despite Bernhardt having lost a leg to infection, her memories of the performance and of Bernhardt's "lovely speaking voice and her limpid gestures" remained everlasting.

=== University of Michigan and Yale ===
At the University of Michigan, Smith audited a number of journalism and playwriting courses and was a student in some of the classes of Professor Kenneth Thorpe Rowe. Under the guidance of Rowe, she wrote several plays, including the three-act Jonica Starrs, a story of adultery and the break-up of a marriage. The play won the Long Play Contest of the University of Michigan's Division of English. It was given a full production in Ann Arbor in June 1930.

Smith's life reached a turning point in 1931 when she won the University of Michigan's Avery Hopwood Award for her full length play Francie Nolan, which she later re-titled Becomes A Woman when she applied for copyright. With the award, Smith received $1,000 a considerable amount of money in the early 1930s, but, perhaps more importantly, public attention for her work. However, Becomes A Woman wouldn't be produced until 2023 when Mint Theater Company premiered the play.

With the conferring of the Hopwood Award, Smith was invited to study drama at Yale University, where, under the tutelage of the renowned teacher George Pierce Baker, she wrote several plays during her two-year fellowship. At this time, she met a budding playwright, Robert V. Finch, known as "Bob," who became a close confidante and companion. With outside pressures mounting, particularly money concerns as the fellowship had ended, her studies at Yale came to an end in the spring of 1934. Moreover, she deeply missed her children, who had been placed with her sister's family on Long Island.

Because Smith never completed high school, she was unable to formally matriculate at the University of Michigan. As a result, she never earned a Bachelor of Arts degree, despite having taken more than enough courses. And without the B.A., she was unable to earn the Master of Fine Arts degree at Yale.

=== Federal Theatre Project ===
With the end of her drama studies at Yale, Smith and her children returned to live briefly in her mother's house in Woodhaven, Queens. In 1935, an opportunity with the Works Projects Administration fortuitously arose, and Smith began working for the Federal Theatre Project as a play reader. In May 1936, she and three other Federal Theatre Project members, including Bob Finch, were shifted to Chapel Hill, North Carolina to participate in regional theater activities. It was in Chapel Hill that Smith finally found a place to call home, and despite continuing struggles with money, she began to write more earnestly.

== Novelist ==
In the late 1930s, Smith began to shift her attention from play writing to attempting a novel. Encouraged by her longtime friend, playwright Bob Finch, as well as her writing group, she turned her eye toward a milieu with which she was familiar: the tenements and streets of Brooklyn. In total, Smith wrote four published novels during her lifetime, three of which take Brooklyn as a setting. Her first novel, A Tree Grows in Brooklyn, was published in 1943. The book became an immediate bestseller and catapulted Smith to fame. Four years later, in 1947, the novel Tomorrow Will Be Better appeared. It would be another 11 years before Maggie-Now, her third book, was published in 1958. Smith's fourth and final novel, Joy in the Morning appeared in 1963.

=== A Tree Grows in Brooklyn ===
While living and working in Chapel Hill, Smith produced a novel with the working title of They Lived in Brooklyn. The work was rejected by several publishers before Harper and Brothers showed an interest in 1942. Working with Harper editors Smith substantially revised the novel, trimming characters, dialogue, and scenes, while selectively adding others. Finally, the book was accepted for publication and was released in 1943 with the title, A Tree Grows in Brooklyn. Smith later acknowledged the novel and its heroine Francie Nolan were largely based on her own life and experiences. The novel is often categorized as a Bildungsroman, one which focuses on the psychological and moral growth and change of the protagonist from childhood to adulthood (coming of age).

In 1944, 20th Century Fox adapted the novel into a film directed by theater director Elia Kazan. A Tree Grows in Brooklyn starred James Dunn, Dorothy McGuire, Joan Blondell, and Peggy Ann Garner, who won a Special Academy Award for Outstanding Child Actress of 1945. James Dunn's performance as Johnny Nolan, Francie's father, won him the Academy Award for Best Supporting Actor. The film also received a nomination for Best Adapted Screenplay.

During WWII, American publishers produced the Armed Services Editions of books to be sent to soldiers fighting overseas. Hundreds of works ended up in the hands and hearts of servicemen, but reportedly "the most popular book of all seems to have been A Tree Grows in Brooklyn." So popular that Betty Smith received "some fifteen hundred letters" every year from soldiers. And as noted below, she would marry a serviceman and editor in 1943.

In 1974, a second film adaptation was released. In the early 1950s, Smith teamed with George Abbott to write the book for the 1951 musical adaptation of A Tree Grows in Brooklyn.

=== Tomorrow Will Be Better ===
Smith's second book, Tomorrow Will Be Better, was published in 1947. Set in the tenements of 1920s Brooklyn, the novel presents a realistic portrayal of young adults who seek a brighter future. Published just four years after A Tree Grows in Brooklyn, the second book naturally drew critical comparisons to the first because both novels dealt with family life in Brooklyn and the struggle with poverty. Margy Shannon, the central character in Tomorrow Will be Better, is from a poor family with a dominant mother. She meets and is courted by Frankie, a fellow Brooklynite, also contending with poverty. They strive to improve their lot, attempting to overcome the many personal and financial obstacles in their way.

Tomorrow Will Be Better was published to mixed reviews. It received a positive notice in The New York Times, which noted the work is noticeably different in spirit from Smith's first book and praised Smith's writing style as "remarkable for its unpretentiousness—an easy, tidy, direct kind of prose which calls no attention to itself". Other reviews, however, were less warm, often judging the novel as "gloomy".

=== Maggie-Now ===
Smith's third novel Maggie-Now was published in 1958.

=== Joy in the Morning ===
Joy in the Morning, Smith's fourth, and last, novel appeared in 1963. The novel was adapted into the 1965 film of the same name.

== Personal life ==
As a child, Smith was called Lizzie, but because she had difficulty pronouncing her z's, her family took to calling her Liddie. She had a younger brother, William (b. 1898) and a younger sister, Regina (b. 1903). Her relationship with her father John was warm and loving even though he was an alcoholic who only provided sporadically for his family. John Wehner died December 21, 1913, at the age of 40.

In 1918, her mother Catherine married a second time, to Michael Keogh, an Irishman 13 years her senior who worked in the city's public works department. The marriage brought long needed financial stability to the family. Both William and Regina assumed the Keogh surname, but Lizzie, due to her age, did not. In either 1918 or early 1919, around the age of 22, Smith may have suffered the trauma of sexual abuse. Although she never directly identified anyone, her later correspondence and writings suggest the involvement of her stepfather Michael Keogh. Additionally, after leaving the Keogh household in 1919, she returned infrequently, and then only briefly, until Keogh died in 1933.

Smith married three times. Her first marriage at age 23 was to George H.E. Smith on October 18, 1919, in Ann Arbor, Michigan. She had met George in 1917 at the Jackson Street Settlement House and then joined him in Ann Arbor where they quickly wed. The couple had two children: Nancy Jean (1922-2025) and Mary Elizabeth (1924–1979). Due mainly to her husband's infidelity, Betty and George separated and then divorced in 1938. Her second marriage was to Joseph Piper Jones, a serviceman and editor she met in Chapel Hill. They married August 7, 1943 in Norfolk, Virginia. By June 1951, the marriage, which produced no children, was in trouble, and Smith cited incompatibility as a reason to divorce, noting they "had nothing at all in common". Smith traveled to Reno, Nevada, gained residency, and filed for divorce on December 13, 1951. Six years later, in 1957, in Chapel Hill, at the age of 61, she married Robert Voris Finch, a longtime friend and companion she had known since her studies at Yale University. Finch, who had issues with alcohol as well as cardiovascular problems, died on February 4, 1959, less than two years later.

Smith was a petite woman with dark brown hair and strikingly deep blue eyes. She enjoyed fishing, particularly at her cottage in Nags Head, North Carolina. She also was an avid bingo player.

== Death ==
On January 17, 1972, Smith died of pneumonia in Shelton, Connecticut, at the age of 75. In her final years, she also suffered from dementia. She was laid to rest next to her third husband, Robert Finch, in Chapel Hill at the Legion Street Cemetery in North Carolina.

=== Novels ===
- A Tree Grows in Brooklyn (1943)
- Tomorrow Will Be Better (1947)
- Maggie-Now (1958)
- Joy in the Morning (1963)

=== Plays ===
- Jonica Starrs (1930)
- Becomes A Woman, originally titled Francie Nolan (1931)
- Mannequin's Maid (1932)
- Blind Alley (1923)

== Partial filmography ==
- A Tree Grows in Brooklyn (directed by Elia Kazan, starring Dorothy McGuire, James Dunn, and Joan Blondell). 20th Century Fox, 1945.
- Joy in the Morning (directed by Alex Segal, starring Richard Chamberlain and Yvette Mimieux). Metro-Goldwyn-Mayer, 1965.

== Sources ==
- Yow, Valerie Raleigh (2008). Betty Smith: Life of the Author of A Tree Grows in Brooklyn. Wolf's Pond Press. ISBN 9780970224934.
