= A Tree Grows in Brooklyn (1945 film) =

1945 American drama film by Elia Kazan

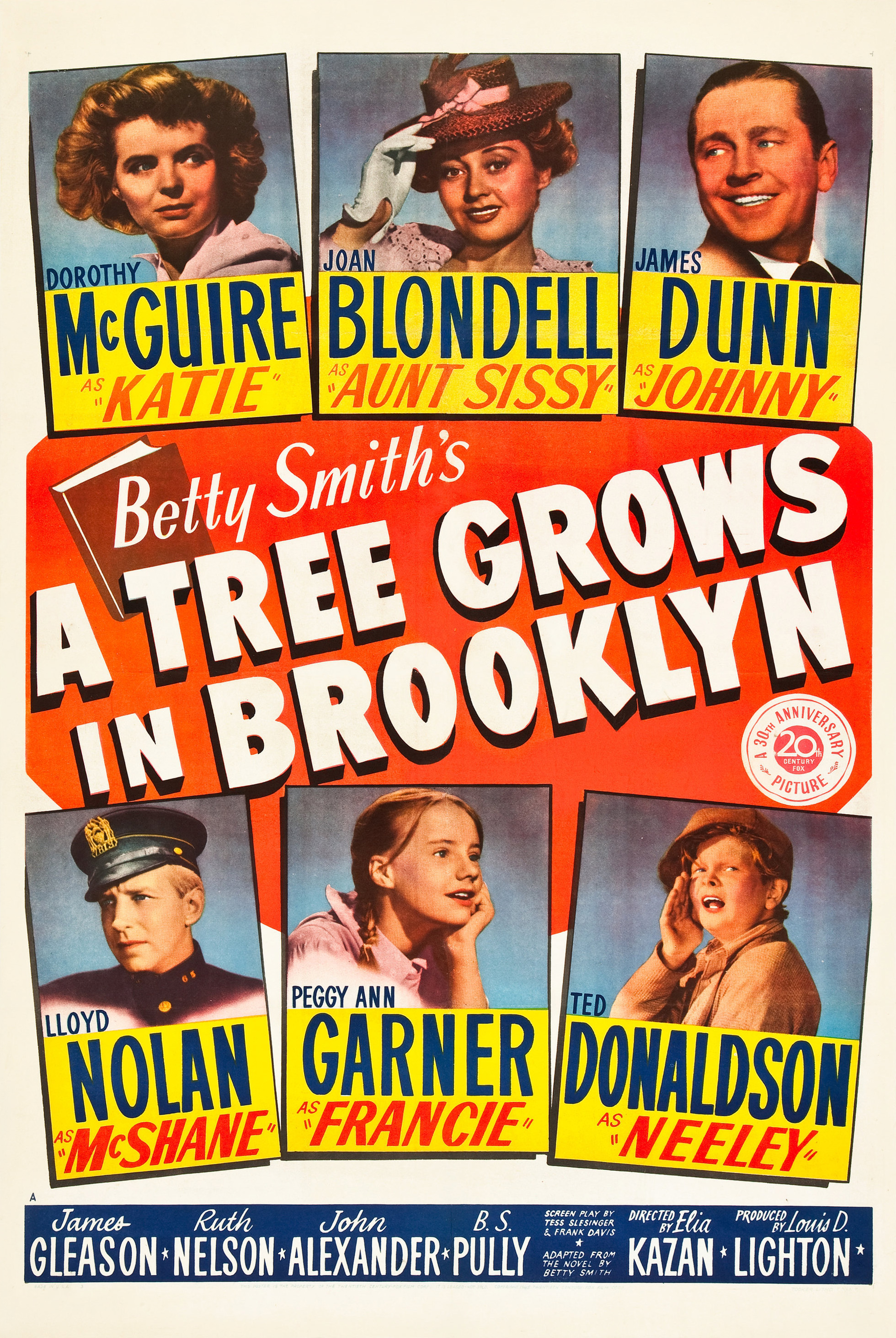
- Theatrical release poster
- Directed by: Elia Kazan
- Screenplay by: Tess Slesinger; Frank Davis
- Based on: A Tree Grows in Brooklyn a 1943 novel by Betty Smith
- Produced by: Louis D. Lighton
- Starring: Dorothy McGuire; Joan Blondell; James Dunn; Lloyd Nolan; Peggy Ann Garner; Ted Donaldson; James Gleason; Ruth Nelson; John Alexander; B.S. Pully
- Cinematography: Leon Shamroy
- Edited by: Dorothy Spencer
- Music by: Alfred Newman
- Distributed by: 20th Century Fox
- Release date: February 28, 1945
- Running time: 128 minutes
- Country: United States
- Language: English
- Box office: $3 million

A Tree Grows in Brooklyn is a 1945 American drama film that marked the debut of Elia Kazan as a dramatic film director. Adapted by Tess Slesinger and Frank Davis from the 1943 novel of the same name by Betty Smith, the film focuses on an impoverished, but aspirational, second-generation Irish-American family living in the Williamsburg neighborhood of Brooklyn, New York, in the early 20th century. Peggy Ann Garner received the Academy Juvenile Award for her performance as Francie Nolan, the adolescent girl at the center of the coming-of-age story. The other members of the principal cast include Dorothy McGuire, Joan Blondell, Lloyd Nolan, Ted Donaldson, and James Dunn, who received the Academy Award for Best Supporting Actor for his portrayal of Francie's father.

The screenplay was adapted as a radio play in 1949, as a musical play in 1951, and as a television film in 1974. In 2010, A Tree Grows in Brooklyn was selected for preservation in the United States National Film Registry by the Library of Congress as being "culturally, historically, or aesthetically significant".

== Plot ==
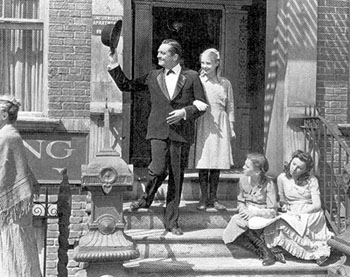
James Dunn and Peggy Ann Garner in A Tree Grows in Brooklyn

The Nolans are a family living in the Williamsburg neighborhood of Brooklyn in 1912. Katie is a hard-working, German American housewife who scrubs the floors of her tenement building and collects rags to sell to a scrap fabric dealer in order to provide for her family. She's married to Johnny, a happy-go-lucky, charming Irish American who means well, but dreams his way through life. On the rare occasions he finds work as a singing waiter, he usually ends up spending much of what he earns on his drinking, much to Katie's despair. The couple have two children: 13-year-old Francie, who idolizes her father, and 12-year-old Neeley. Tense and frustrated, Katie is often sharper with the children than she means to be, while Johnny is gentle, generous, and indulgent, especially with Francie.

Katie's sister Sissy is a sassy, free-spirited woman who has recently married for the third time, a fact Katie learns from gossipy insurance agent Mr. Barker when he comes by to collect the Nolans' weekly premium. Scandalized and embarrassed, Katie cuts off her relationship with Sissy, making the children, who love their unconventional aunt, unhappy. Francie is also worried that the building's superintendent has cut too many branches off the lone tree in the tenement's courtyard, and that it may die. When she points this out to Johnny, however, he promises a tree that is able to thrive in such difficult circumstances cannot be killed so easily.

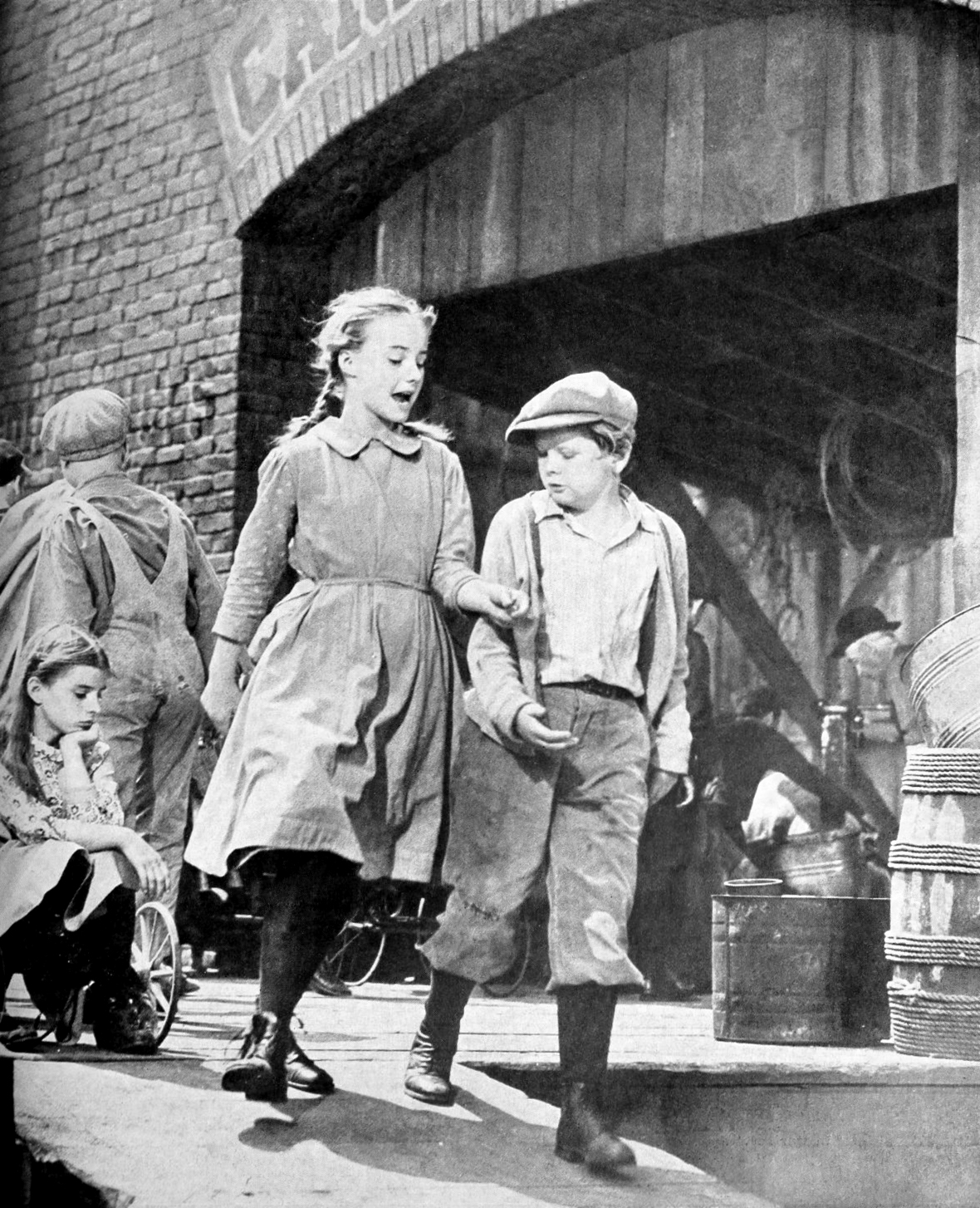
Peggy Ann Garner and Ted Donaldson in A Tree Grows in Brooklyn

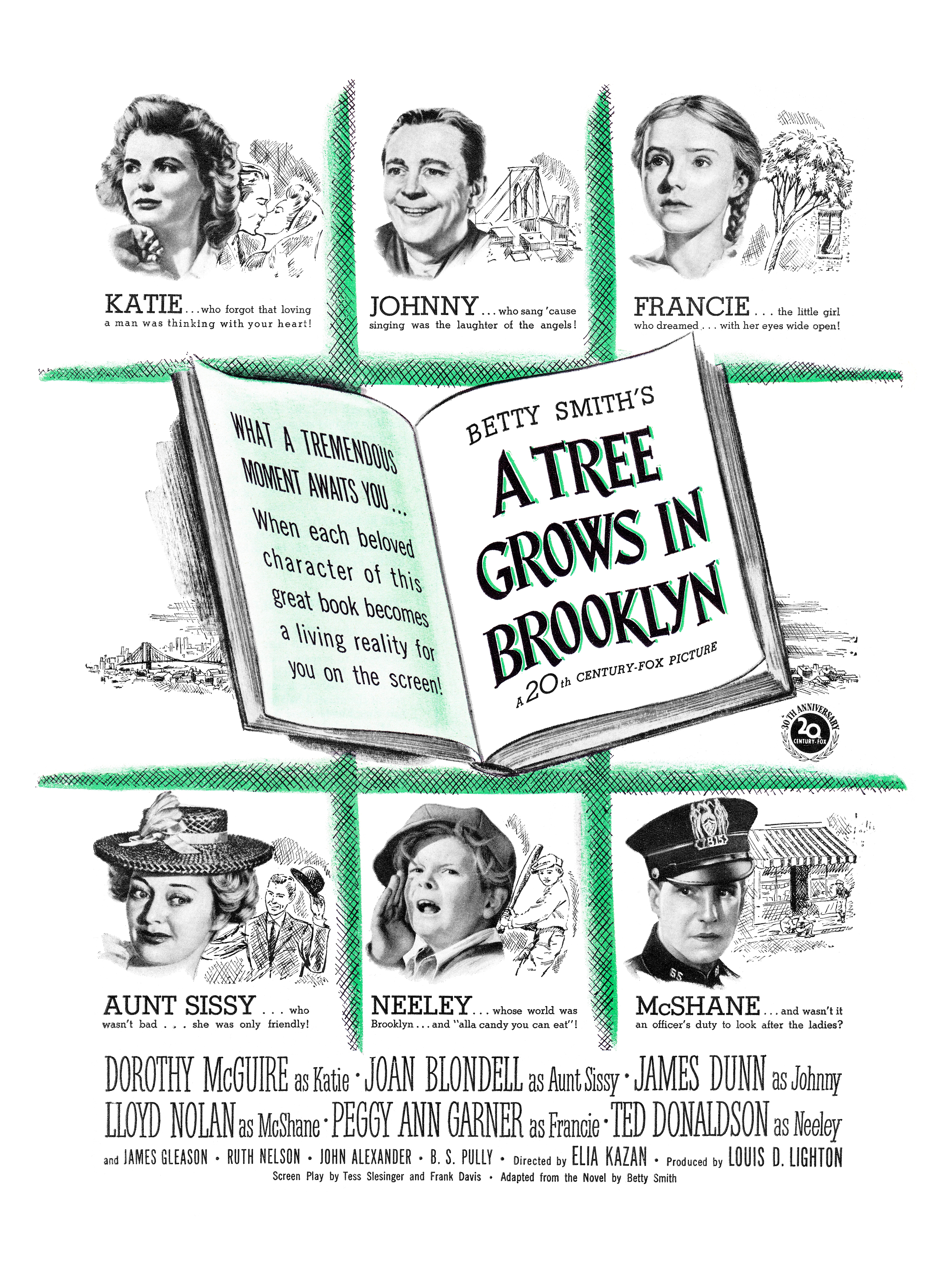
Advertisement (February 1945)

Officer McShane, new to the neighborhood, encounters Sissy and the children one afternoon, and when he meets Katie, he is enchanted. A few days later, however, he is deflated when he meets Johnny, drunk after an argument with his wife, and learns Katie is married.

Katie's mother Rommely often tells Francie and Neeley about her immigration to the United States, and how important education is in life. While Neeley is not interested in books or school, Francie is a bright child who is always reading, thinking about what she reads and observes, and eager to learn. One Sunday, she persuades Johnny to go for a walk and shows him a nice school in a nearby neighborhood which she would like to attend. She helps him write a letter to her principal requesting a transfer, and it is accepted.

When Katie moves the family into a smaller, cheaper apartment on the top floor, Johnny thinks she is being stingy, but, in fact, Katie is pregnant and worried how they will support another child. Sissy also becomes pregnant, and she and Katie reconcile shortly before Christmas. The families celebrate a happy Christmas together, with the children bringing home a discarded tree, and, later that night, Katie tells Johnny about the coming baby. She suggests Francie drop out of school to work, and Johnny, understanding how much school means to his daughter, becomes desperate to find work. He heads out into the snow, and does not return.

A week later, Officer McShane comes to the apartment to deliver the bad news that Johnny collapsed while looking for work. He subsequently dies of pneumonia. Francie blames Katie for his death, and is deeply hurt when she learns of Katie's plans for her to quit school, which only change after a sympathetic bar owner, McGarrity, gives Francie and Neeley after-school jobs, providing some extra income.

During Katie's labor, at home because they cannot afford the hospital birth Sissy had, Francie is Katie's greatest help and comfort. Katie asks Francie to read one of her creative writing essays and confides how much she misses Johnny, and the shared experience brings mother and daughter closer. When the baby girl is born, Katie names her Annie Laurie, after a song Johnny once sang.

In June, Francie and Neeley graduate from their respective schools on the same day. Katie attends Neeley's graduation, while Sissy accompanies Francie. Using money Johnny gave her for safekeeping back in December, Sissy gives Francie a bouquet of flowers from her father, along with a congratulatory card that Johnny wrote himself. Francie, who has bottled up her grief for months, finally breaks down in tears.

After the graduation ceremonies, the family reunites at the ice cream shop to celebrate. While there, a boy asks Francie to a movie the next day—her first date.

When the Nolans return home, they find Sissy's husband and baby joined by Officer McShane, who is holding Annie Laurie. McShane has visited to ask if he can begin courting Katie when she is ready, and she accepts. He says he only hopes to be like a good friend to Francie and Neeley, but asks to adopt Annie Laurie after the wedding, and give her his last name.

Later, on the roof, Francie and Neeley reflect how Annie Laurie's comfortable life with McShane as a father will be easier than theirs, but not nearly as much fun. Francie then sees that the tree in the courtyard has begun to regrow, just as Johnny said it would.

== Cast ==
- Dorothy McGuire as Katie Nolan
- Joan Blondell as Aunt Sissy, Katie's older sister
- James Dunn as Johnny Nolan
- Lloyd Nolan as Officer McShane
- James Gleason as McGarrity, a kindly bar owner
- Ted Donaldson as Neeley Nolan
- Peggy Ann Garner as Francie Nolan
- Ruth Nelson as Miss McDonough, Francie's new teacher
- John Alexander as Steve Edwards, Sissy's husband
- B.S. Pully as the Christmas tree vendor
- J. Farrell MacDonald as Carney, the junkman (uncredited)
- John Berkes as Creckenbox, the tenement super (uncredited)
- Charles Halton as Barker, the insurance agent (uncredited)
- Alec Craig as Werner, the butcher (uncredited)
- Lillian Bronson as the librarian (uncredited)
- Ferike Boros as Grandma Rommely, Katie's mother (uncredited)
- Virginia Brissac as Miss Tilford, Francie's old teacher (uncredited)
- Adeline De Walt Reynolds as Mrs. Waters, who moves out of the top-floor apartment (uncredited)
- Art Smith as Charley, the iceman, who helps the Nolan's move (uncredited)
- Harry Harvey Jr. as Herschel Knutson, Francie's suitor (uncredited)

== Production ==
=== Development ===
The film rights to Betty Smith's novel A Tree Grows in Brooklyn were the focus of a studio bidding war even before its publication in 1943. 20th Century Fox acquired the rights for $55,000. The screenplay was written by Tess Slesinger and Frank Davis, a married couple who often worked together. While the book covers the time from before Francie is born until after she turns 16, the film covers a much shorter timespan, focusing on when Francie is around 13 years old. The film marked the feature film directorial debut of Elia Kazan, who had previously achieved renown as a stage director. It was also the first Hollywood film for Nicholas Ray, who was credited as a dialogue coach.

The Production Code Administration initially refused to approve the screenplay due to "the bigamous characterization of Sissy", who appears to be remarrying men even before her previous husbands have died. It was finally approved in May 1944, although Production Code officials issued "further warnings that Sissy's 'false philosophy' regarding the nature of love and marriage should be toned down". The studio did soften Sissy's characterization due to a libel suit filed by Smith's cousin, Sadie Grandner, who claimed the character had been based on her and that she had suffered "scorn and ridicule" as a result. Fox settled out of court with Grandner for the sum of $1,500.

=== Casting ===
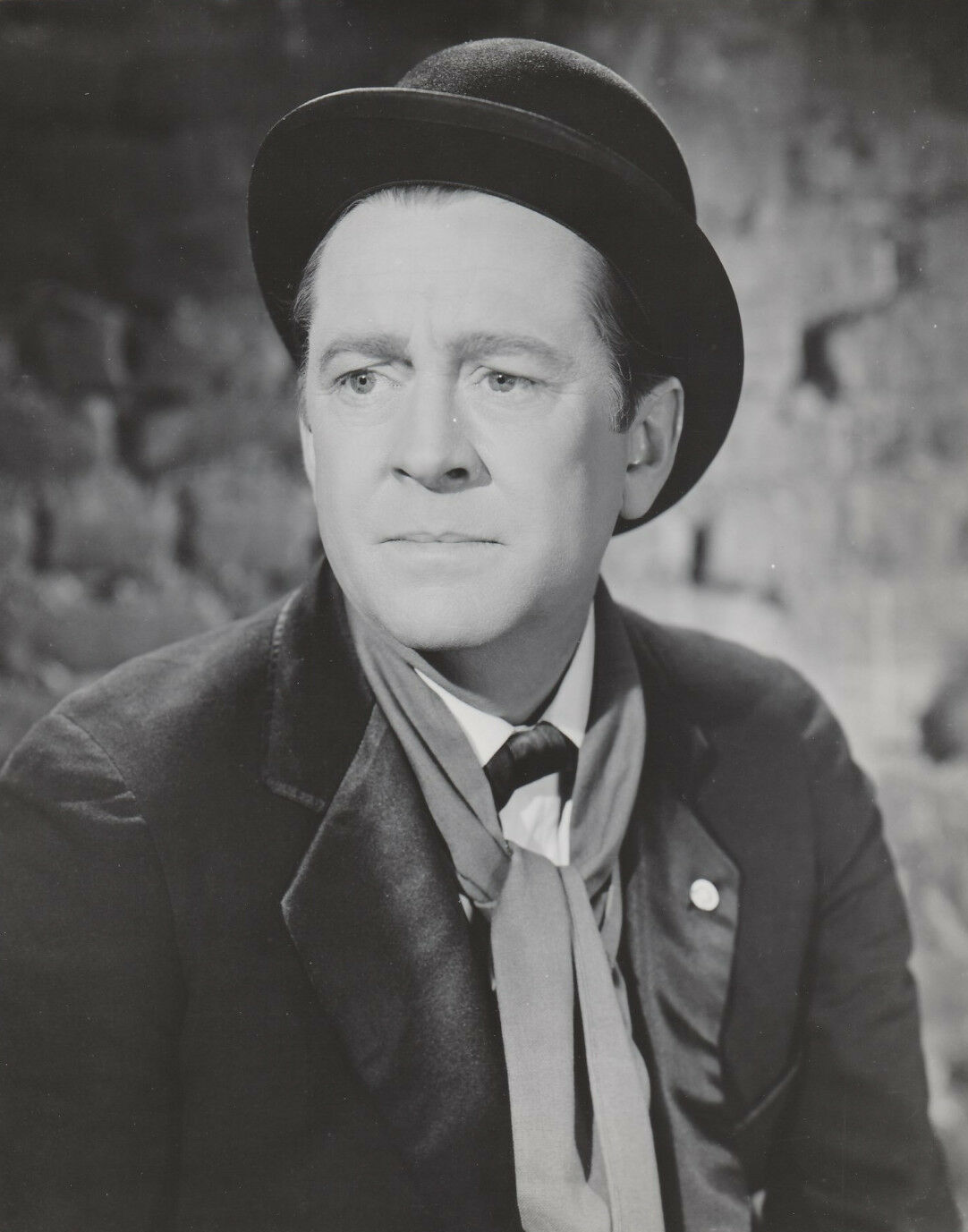
James Dunn as Johnny Nolan

20th Century Fox originally intended to cast Alice Faye in the lead role of Katie Nolan. As she was unavailable, Gene Tierney was called for a screen test, but, ultimately, Dorothy McGuire, who was only 16 years older than the actress who played her daughter Francie, was cast in the role. The studio originally considered casting an older actress as Francie, since the part was so demanding, but Kazan insisted on a child performer, and Peggy Ann Garner was signed.

A months-long talent search was launched for the part of Johnny Nolan. Phil Regan was considered for the role, but several months later James Dunn was signed. According to The Hollywood Reporter: "Dunn was tested twice, once at the beginning of the search, and again after all other possibilities had been abandoned and it was certain no top box office name would be available". Dunn's critically acclaimed performance turned out to be "a personal triumph" for the actor, who had not appeared in a major studio film for five years.

=== Filming ===
Production took place between May 1 and August 2, 1944. Filmed on the 20th Century Fox lot, a full stage was taken up with a four-story replica of a Brooklyn tenement house. Described as "the most elaborate and, mechanically speaking, costly set to be used", it included elevators that enabled the camera to pan up and down the flights of stairs in some scenes. The tree of the film's title has been identified as an ailanthus glandulosa, or "tree of heaven". Despite the heat generated by the Klieg lights, the tree survived the filming and was re-planted elsewhere on the studio lot.

20th Century Fox executive Stan Hough later estimated the film's production budget at $3.6 million.

== Release ==
A Tree Grows in Brooklyn was released in February 1945. It was first viewed by United States troops based in Manila, and its West Coast premiere was a benefit for the Naval Aid Auxiliary.

The film grossed $3 million in box office receipts.

== Critical reception ==
Critics praised the film. Bosley Crowther of The New York Times called it "a vastly affecting film" and praised the "generally excellent cast", singling out Garner, who, "with her plain face and lank hair, is Miss Smith's Francie Nolan to the life", and Dunn, who portrays her father with a "deep and sympathetic tenderness". Crowther added: "In the radiant performance by these two actors of a dreamy adoration between father and child is achieved a pictorial demonstration of emotion that is sublimely eloquent". He also praised the "easy naturalness" with which Kazan directs.

A Pittsburgh Sun-Telegraph review called Garner's performance "astonishingly superb", and said Dunn's portrayal "has the mark of greatness about it".

The Star Tribune acknowledged McGuire for lending "intelligence and depth to a role which, in the hands of a less capable player, might have been shallow and lifeless". This review also complimented the studio for successfully transferring the novel to the screen, managing to trim the novel's scope without distorting the story or message.

Variety praised Kazan's direction for handling the potentially tragic story of the overcrowded and poverty-stricken Brooklyn tenements capably and not letting the film become "maudlin".

Writing in The Nation, critic James Agee was disappointed, however, saying: "The Tree's attention to poverty and need, though frank as such things go in films, is also temperate compared with the staring facts of poverty and need; the comfortable have always been able to lick their chops over the hunger of others if that hunger is presented with the right sort of humorous or pathetic charm ... The characters themselves bother me most, but here I have an even harder time defining my mistrust of them. It is, roughly, that the imagination has been used a little too glibly to blow up and trim off the presumptive originals of these characters into very comfortably readable, actable, easily understandable creatures, whose faults and virtues are all tagged or neatly braided."

A retrospective review by Leonard Maltin called the film "perfect in every detail".

== Accolades ==
The film was recognized as one of the ten best films of the year by the National Board of Review, Time, and The New York Times, among others. At the 18th Academy Awards, it won in one acting category, earned an honorary juvenile award, and received a nomination for adapted screenplay:

Award	Result	Nominee
Best Supporting Actor	Won	James Dunn
Academy Juvenile Award	Won	Peggy Ann Garner
Writing, Adapted Screenplay	Nominated	Tess Slesinger and Frank Davis

In 2010, A Tree Grows in Brooklyn was selected for preservation in the United States National Film Registry by the Library of Congress as being "culturally, historically, or aesthetically significant".

== Adaptations ==
James Dunn and Connie Marshall starred in a CBS Radio adaptation of A Tree Grows in Brooklyn that aired on April 28, 1949, on Hallmark Playhouse.

A musical play based on the novel, co-written by Betty Smith and George Abbott, debuted on April 19, 1951, in New York. Joan Blondell reprised her role as Sissy in the road company version of the play, which opened on October 9, 1952.

The film's screenplay was adapted as a 1974 NBC television film directed by Joseph Hardy and starring Cliff Robertson, Diane Baker, Pamelyn Ferdin, and James Olson.

== Home media ==
A Tree Grows in Brooklyn was released in 2010 on Region 1 DVD as part of the 20th Century Fox Home Video box set, The Elia Kazan Collection. In 2019, a 2K restoration of the film was released on Region B Blu-Ray as part of the UK Masters of Cinema series.

== General sources ==
- Solomon, Aubrey (2002). Twentieth Century-Fox: A Corporate and Financial History. Rowman & Littlefield. ISBN 978-0810842441.
