= A Tree Grows in Brooklyn (novel) =

1943 semi-autobiographical novel by Betty Smith

- First edition cover
- Author: Betty Smith
- Language: English
- Publisher: Harper & Brothers
- Publication date: 1943
- Publication place: United States
- Media type: Print (Hardcover and Paperback)
- Pages: 493 p.

A Tree Grows in Brooklyn is a 1943 semi-autobiographical novel written by Betty Smith.

The manuscript started as a non-fiction piece titled They Lived in Brooklyn, which Smith began submitting to publishers in 1940. After it was repeatedly rejected, she sent it in as an entry for a contest held by Harper & Brothers in 1942. At the editors' suggestion, Smith expanded and revised the piece, re-classified it as a novel, and changed the title. It proved so popular upon release that it went into a second printing even before the official publication date. In 2012, it was listed by the Library of Congress as one of the books that shaped America.

The book was an immense success. It was also released in an Armed Services Edition, the size of a mass-market paperback, to fit in a uniform pocket. One Marine wrote to Smith, "I can't explain the emotional reaction that took place in this dead heart of mine... A surge of confidence has swept through me, and I feel that maybe a fellow has a fighting chance in this world after all." The novel was later adapted into a film and a musical.

The main metaphor of the book is the hardy tree of heaven (Ailanthus altissima), whose persistent ability to grow and flourish even in the inner city mirrors the protagonist's desire to better herself.

== Plot ==
The novel is split into five "books", each covering a different period in the characters' lives.

=== Book One ===
Book One opens in 1912 and introduces 11-year-old Francie Nolan, who lives in the Williamsburg tenement neighborhood of Brooklyn with her 10-year-old brother Cornelius ("Neeley" for short) and their parents, Johnny and Katie. Francie relies on her imagination and her love of reading to provide a temporary escape from the poverty that defines her daily existence. The family subsists on Katie's wages from cleaning apartment buildings, pennies from the children's junk-selling and odd jobs, and Johnny's irregular earnings as a singing waiter. His alcoholism has made it difficult for him to hold a steady job, and he sees himself as a disappointment to his family as a result. Francie admires him because he is handsome, talented, imaginative, and sentimental, as she is. Katie has very little time for sentiment, since she is the breadwinner of the family who has forsaken fantasies and dreams for survival.

=== Book Two ===
Book Two jumps back to 1900 and chronicles the meeting of Johnny and Katie, the American-born teenage children of immigrants from Ireland and Austria, respectively. Although Johnny panics and begins drinking heavily when Katie becomes pregnant with first Francie and then Neeley, Katie resolves to give her children a better life than she has known, remembering her mother's insistence that they receive a good education. Katie resents Francie because the baby is constantly ill, while Neeley is more robust. Katie makes a promise to herself that her daughter must never learn of her preference for Neeley. During the first seven years of their marriage, the Nolans are forced to move twice within Williamsburg, due to public disgraces caused first by Johnny's drunkenness and later by the children's Aunt Sissy's misguided efforts at babysitting them. The Nolans then arrive at the apartment introduced in Book One.

=== Book Three ===
In Book Three, the Nolans settle into their new home, and seven-year-old Francie and six-year-old Neeley begin to attend the squalid, overcrowded public school next door. Francie enjoys learning, even in these dismal surroundings, and gets herself transferred to a better school in a different school district with Johnny's support. Johnny fails in his efforts to improve the children's minds, but Katie helps Francie grow as a person and saves her life by shooting a child-rapist/murderer who tries to attack Francie shortly before her 14th birthday. When Johnny learns that Katie is pregnant once again, he falls into a depression that leads to his death from alcoholism-induced pneumonia on Christmas Day 1915. Katie uses the entire proceeds of Johnny's life insurance to give him a respectable burial. She then cancels the children's life insurance policies to reduce expenses, and along with their earnings from after-school jobs she is able to keep the family afloat in 1916. Francie's English teacher, Miss Garnder, rebukes her for writing about unpleasant aspects of life, such as poverty and alcoholism, and rejects the play she has written for graduation. The new baby, Annie Laurie, is born that May, and Francie graduates from grade school in June. Graduation allows Francie to finally come to terms with the reality of her father’s death.

=== Book Four ===
At the start of Book Four, Francie and Neeley take jobs because there is no money to send them to high school. Francie works in an artificial flower factory, then gets a better-paying job in a press clipping office after lying about her age. Although she wants to use her salary to start high school in the fall, Katie decides to send Neeley instead, reasoning that he will only continue learning if he is forced into it, while Francie will find a way to do it on her own. Once the United States enters World War I in 1917, the clipping office rapidly declines and closes, leaving Francie out of a job. After she finds work as a teletype operator, she makes a new plan for her education, choosing to skip high school and take summer college-level courses. She passes with the help of Ben Blake, a friendly and determined high school student, but she fails the college's entrance exams. A brief encounter with Lee Rhynor, a soldier preparing to ship out to France, leads to heartbreak after he pretends to be in love with Francie, when he is in fact about to get married. In 1918, Katie accepts a marriage proposal from Michael McShane, a retired police officer who has long admired her and has become a wealthy businessman and politician since leaving the force.

=== Book Five ===
As Book Five begins in the fall of this same year, Francie, now almost 17, quits her teletype job. She is about to start classes at the University of Michigan, having passed the entrance exams with Ben's help, and is considering the possibility of a future relationship with him. The Nolans prepare for Katie's wedding and the move from their Brooklyn apartment to McShane's home. Francie pays one last visit to some of her favorite childhood places and reflects on all the people who have come and gone in her life. She is struck by how much of Johnny's character lives on in Neeley, who has become a talented jazz/ragtime pianist. Before she leaves the apartment, Francie notices the tree of heaven that has grown and re-sprouted in the building's yard despite all efforts to destroy it, seeing in it a symbol for her family's ability to overcome adversity and thrive. In the habits of a neighborhood girl, Florry, Francie sees a version of her young self, sitting on the fire escape with a book and watching the young ladies of the neighborhood prepare for their dates. Francie says, "Hello, Francie", to Florry, and then, "Goodbye, Francie" as she closes the window.

== Characters ==
Mary Frances "Francie" Nolan is the protagonist. The novel begins when Francie is 11 years old. The rest of the novel tells of Francie's life until she goes to college at 17. Francie grows up in Brooklyn in the early twentieth century; her family is in constant poverty throughout most of the novel. Francie shares a great admiration for her father, Johnny Nolan, and wishes for an improved relationship with her mother, hardworking Katie Nolan, recognizing similar traits in her mother and herself that she believes are a barrier to true understanding. The story of Francie traces her individual desires, affections, and hostilities while growing up in an aggressive, individualistic, romantic, and ethnic family and neighborhood; more universally it represents the hopes of immigrants in the early twentieth century to rise above poverty through their children, whom they hope will receive "education" and take their place among true Americans. Francie is symbolized by the tree of heaven that flourishes under the most unlikely urban circumstances. Some argue that the novel's wild success is a result of the memoir style that allows us to see her thoughts and story from such an intimate perspective.

Katie Rommely Nolan is Francie's mother and the youngest of her parents' four daughters. She is a first-generation immigrant with a tyrannical, mean father and a stoic, devout, old-world mother who emigrated from Austria. She married Johnny Nolan when she was only 17 years old. Katie is a hardworking, practical woman whose youthful romanticism has been replaced by a frigid realism that often prevents her from sympathizing with those who love her most. She runs her home in such a way that her children are able to enjoy their childhood despite their extreme poverty. Because Johnny is an alcoholic and can rarely hold down a job, Katie becomes the family breadwinner by cleaning apartment buildings. Johnny, however, is more attuned to Francie's hopes of graduating from high school and becoming a writer. As Francie matures and develops an inclination toward academia, Katie realizes she is more devoted to Neeley than to Francie. Katie becomes pregnant just before Johnny dies and survives on her own until she agrees to marry Sergeant Michael McShane, a pipe-smoking local policeman-turned-politician.

Sissy Rommely is Katie's oldest sister and one of Francie's three aunts. Because of her parents' immigration and lack of knowledge in their new environment, Sissy never goes to school and is therefore illiterate. Sissy is kind, compassionate and beautiful, and many men fall in love with her. She is first married at 14, but after being unable to have any live children with her husband, Sissy leaves him. She marries two more times without ever getting a divorce. In between marriages, Sissy has a number of lovers. She calls each of her husbands and lovers by the name "John" until her final husband, who insists that she properly divorce her second husband and demands to be called by his own name, Steve. Sissy has ten stillborn children, but adopts an immigrant girl's baby daughter born out of wedlock and eventually gives birth to a healthy son of her own.

Johnny Nolan is Francie's father. He is a first-generation American; his parents immigrated from Ireland. He has a protective mother and had three brothers, all of whom died young. Johnny marries Katie Rommely at nineteen. He is charismatic, a loving husband and father, loved dearly by his family but especially by Francie. He is, however, an alcoholic. When he does hold a job, Johnny works as a singing waiter. He has a beautiful voice, a talent that is greatly admired but that is largely wasted because of his alcoholism. After Katie tells him that she is pregnant with their third child, he stops drinking and immediately falls into a deep depression that ends with his death from alcoholism-induced pneumonia. He is a dreamer, in sharp contrast to Katie, whose view of the world is realistic.

Cornelius "Neeley" Nolan is Francie's little brother. He is a year younger than Francie and is favored by his mother, Katie. Neeley is an outgoing child who is more widely accepted by the neighborhood children than Francie. He shows more emotion when his father dies than Francie, who reacts to the loss by becoming even more determined to get an education and rise above her mother's limited vision. Neeley refuses to follow the tradition of Nolan men and determines to never become an alcoholic. Like Francie, he feels that their childhood was pleasant despite their poverty.

Eva "Evy" Rommely Flittman is Katie's youngest sister and Francie's other aunt, playing a role more minor than Sissy's. While considered throughout most of the novel to be in less dire circumstances than Katie, Evy struggles with her lazy husband Willie, a milk-wagon driver. When Willie suffers an injury, Evy drives the route instead and proves surprisingly good at it, treating the horses much more kindly than Willie does. At the end of the novel, he leaves her to travel as a one-man band and she carries on without a husband. When McShane gives Katie $1,000 as a wedding present, she passes $200 on to Evy—the value of Willie's life insurance policy. Unlike Sissy, Evy has had only one marriage and is not assumed to be promiscuous. She has three children, a girl (Blossom), and two boys (Paul Jones and Willie, Jr.).

Eliza Rommely is Francie's third aunt who is only mentioned once. She became a nun because of her mother's love of the Catholic church. Francie only met her once. At first Francie toyed with the idea of being a nun, but when she saw her aunt's mustache-like facial hair, she thought that happened to all nuns, and changed her mind.

Thomas and Mary Rommely are the parents of Sissy, Eliza, Evy, and Katie; they emigrate to America from Austria just before Sissy is born. While Thomas hates America, enjoys tormenting Mary, and forbids the speaking of English at home, Mary patiently endures her hardships and serves as a moral/practical guide for her daughters. Mary cannot read or write English, but she encourages Katie to ensure that her children learn the language, and also to begin saving money so she can buy land someday. The Rommelys' second oldest daughter, Eliza, is mentioned only briefly; she becomes a nun and joins a convent.

Flossie Gaddis is one of the Nolans' neighbors, a single woman who scares men away as she constantly looks for new relationships. She keeps her right arm covered at all times to hide scars from a childhood accident with a tub of scalding water. She has a brother, Henny, who is dying of tuberculosis.

Lee Rhynor is Francie's first real date, a soldier on leave who tries to manipulate Francie into sleeping with him before shipping out to France despite already being engaged to marry another woman.

Ben Blake is a driven college student who befriends Francie during her summer classes. At the end of the novel, Ben gives Francie a promise ring and promises to marry her in five years if she still wants that. Francie likes Ben a lot, but is not yet sure she loves him.

== Themes ==
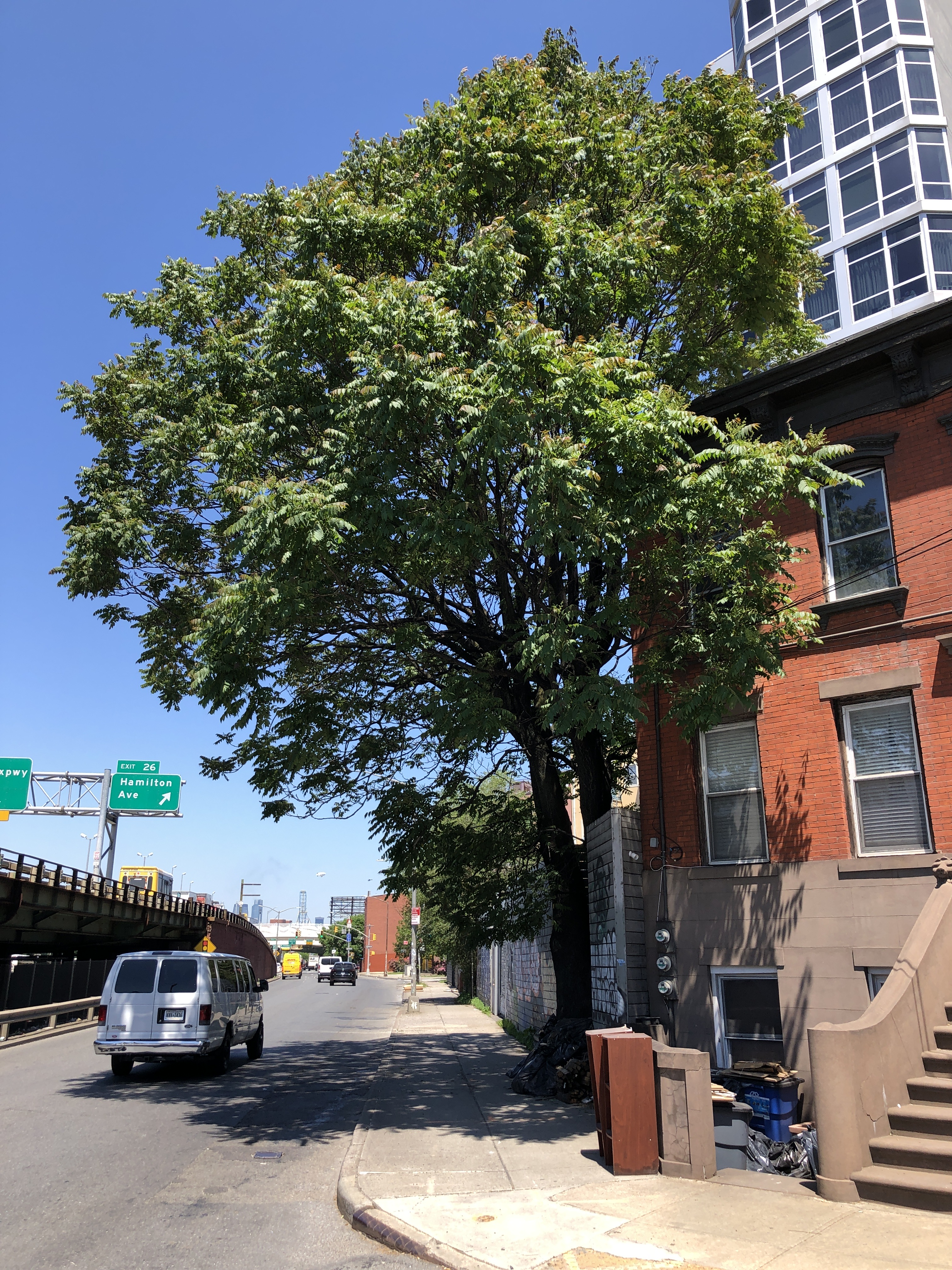
A Tree-of-Heaven in Brooklyn in 2024

Although the book addresses many different issues—poverty, alcoholism, lying, etc.—its main theme is the need for tenacity: the determination to rise above difficult circumstances. Although there are naturalistic elements in the book, it is not fundamentally naturalistic. The Nolans are financially restricted by poverty, yet they find ways to enjoy life and to satisfy their needs and wants. For example, Francie can become intoxicated just by looking at flowers.

Idealism and pragmatism are weighed, and both are deemed necessary to survival in Brooklyn. Johnny lies about his family's address in order to enable Francie to attend a better school, presenting Francie with opportunities that might not have been available to her otherwise. Sissy helps Johnny recover from alcoholic withdrawals by appealing to his libido, helping Katie and Johnny to stay together despite Johnny's disease. Katie explains love and sexuality to Francie from two somewhat clashing points of view: as a mother and as a woman. The book revises traditional notions of right and wrong and suggests pointedly that extreme poverty changes the criteria on which such notions, and those who embrace them, should be judged.

The novel’s commentary on poverty and the effects that it has is also integral to the overarching themes of the book. For example, outwardly Johnny seems to confirm stereotypical assumptions about the poor with his addiction and inability to provide for his family. However, when his character and intentions are taken into account along with his addiction and choices, it raises questions about agency in poverty and the extent to which gender roles should inform the reader's opinion of a character’s moral standing. Along with Johnny, almost every character in the novel brings a different aspect of poverty to light making A Tree Grows in Brooklyn an intricate yet bluntly honest snapshot of the poor in Brooklyn during the early 1900s.

Other issues the book addresses include:

- Humanity vs. its environment
- Education
- Coming of age/loss of innocence
- Family/ family relationships
- Exploitation
- Love
- The American Dream

== Adaptations ==
- The book was adapted into a 1945 film directed by Elia Kazan, starring James Dunn, Dorothy McGuire, Joan Blondell, and Peggy Ann Garner, who won a Special Academy Award for Outstanding Child Actress of 1945. James Dunn won an Academy Award for Best Supporting Actor in the film.
- William Meade Prince adapted the novel into a 1944 comic strip, distributed by King Features.
- George Abbott collaborated with the book's author to produce and direct the story as a 1951 Broadway musical, with music by Arthur Schwartz and choreography by Herbert Ross. The show starred Shirley Booth, Marcia van Dyke, and 12-year-old Nomi Mitty (as Francie). It ran for 267 performances.
- A 1974 "made for television" movie adaptation, based on the film's screenplay, stars Cliff Robertson and Pamelyn Ferdin.

== In popular culture ==
=== Cartoons ===
- A Hare Grows in Manhattan (1947) is a Merrie Melodies cartoon. At the end, Bugs Bunny shows the book to a pack of menacing dogs, whereupon they turn away from him and run to Brooklyn, presumably to urinate on the tree.
- The Warner Bros. Looney Tunes animated short film Scent-imental Over You (1947), featuring Pepé Le Pew, shows multiple dogs looking through a bookstore window displaying A Tree Grows in Brooklyn.

=== Literature ===
- The book was one of the most popular Armed Services Edition books shipped to American military service personnel for free during World War II. Smith said that she received ten times more fan mail from soldiers than she did from civilians. The book was originally printed as series D-117 (~50,000 copies). Demand for the novel was so high it was quickly reprinted as K-28.
- The protagonist in Jeannette Walls' 2005 memoir The Glass Castle makes reference to growing up reading A Tree Grows in Brooklyn and finding inspiration in the character of Francie Nolan.
- There is a reference to the book in The Tale of the Body Thief, the fourth novel of Anne Rice's The Vampire Chronicles.
- The protagonist of Cindy Morgan's novel The Year of Jubilee is gifted the book near the end of the story.

=== Music ===
- Jay-Z makes references to the title of the book in "Some How, Some Way" (from The Blueprint 2: The Gift & The Curse) and "Interlude" (from The Black Album).
- Rapper Talib Kweli refers to A Tree Grows in Brooklyn in Black Star's track "Respiration".
- "A Flower Grows in Brooklyn" is the penultimate track on rapper Positive K's 1992 album, The Skills Dat Pay da Bills.
- The 1997 Lifetime album Jersey's Best Dancers includes a song entitled "Francie Nolan".
- British singer-songwriter Olivia Chaney recorded a song entitled "A Tree Grows in Brooklyn" on her 2018 album Shelter.

=== Radio ===
On October 7, 1947 Studio One on CBS aired A Tree Grows in Brooklyn starring Rosemary Rice as Francie.

=== Television ===
- In the HBO miniseries Band of Brothers, episode 9 ("Why We Fight"), Frank Perconte is seen reading the book while on guard duty in Germany, during World War II.
- Batman, season 2, episode 13, featuring the villain Egghead, is titled "An Egg Grows in Gotham".
- Daria, season 4, episode 3 is named "A Tree Grows in Lawndale".
- In season 1, episode 17 of I Love Lucy, Lucy schemes to get her husband, Ricky, into a play she wrote called "A Tree Grows in Havana", referring to Ricky's homeland of Cuba.
- A Super Grover segment in Sesame Street, episode #4224 takes place "where two trees grow in Brooklyn".
- Season 24 of The Simpsons has an episode called "A Tree Grows in Springfield".
- Ugly Betty, season 1, episode 22 is named "A Tree Grows in Guadalajara".
- In episode 17 of the documentary series The World at War, a soldier can be seen reading the book in archival footage of soldiers preparing for the D-Day invasion of Normandy.
- Will & Grace, Series 1, Episode 2. Will notices a tree outside Grace's new apartment in Brooklyn. Grace - "See, trees really do grow here!"
- Gossip Girl, Season 5, Episode 20. Blair refuses to volunteer at a community garden, telling Dan - "Just because a tree grows in Brooklyn, doesn't mean I have to be the one planting it".
- Morning Show, Season 1, Episode 7
- In Season 1, Episode 2 of A League of Their Own, catcher Carson Shaw (Abbi Jacobson) is recommended the book by fellow player Greta (D'Arcy Carden), telling her that she "would like it". In Episode 8, Carson, now the coach, gives an inspirational speech to the team, quoting a passage from the book.

== See also ==
- A Tree Grows in Brooklyn (1945 film)
- A Tree Grows in Brooklyn (musical)
