= Dorothy Fields =

American librettist and lyricist (1904–1974)

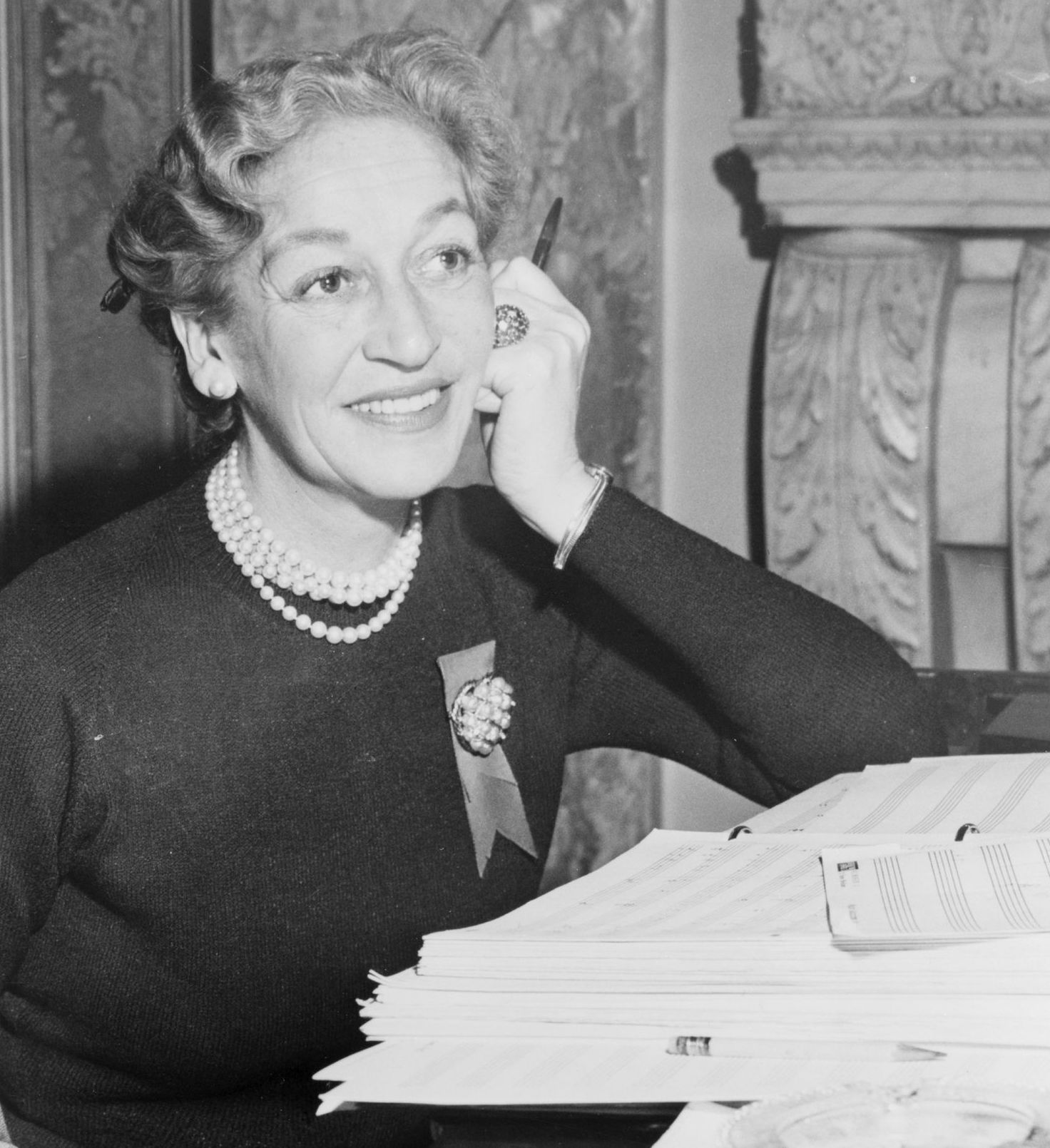
- Fields working on A Tree Grows in Brooklyn (1951)
- Born: July 15, 1904; Allenhurst, New Jersey, U.S.
- Died: March 28, 1974 (aged 69); New York City, U.S.
- Occupations: Librettist and lyricist
- Spouse: Eli Lahm (married 1939)
- Parent: Lew Fields
- Relatives: Joseph Fields (brother); Herbert Fields (brother)
- Musical career

Dorothy Fields (July 15, 1904 – March 28, 1974) was an American librettist and lyricist. She wrote more than 400 songs for Broadway musicals and films. Her best-known pieces include "The Way You Look Tonight" (1936), "A Fine Romance" (1936), "On the Sunny Side of the Street" (1930), "Don't Blame Me" (1948), "Pick Yourself Up" (1936), "I'm in the Mood for Love" (1935), "You Couldn't Be Cuter" (1938) and "Big Spender" (1966). Throughout her career, she collaborated with various influential figures in the American musical theater, including Jerome Kern, Cy Coleman, Irving Berlin, Arthur Schwartz, and Jimmy McHugh. Along with Ann Ronell, Dana Suesse, Bernice Petkere, and Kay Swift, she was one of the first successful Tin Pan Alley and Hollywood female songwriters.

== Early life ==
Fields was born in Allenhurst, New Jersey, and grew up in New York City. In 1923, Fields graduated from the Benjamin School for Girls in New York City. At school, she was outstanding in the subjects of English, drama, and basketball. Her poems were published in the school's literary magazine.

Her family was deeply involved in show business. Her father, Lew Fields, was a Jewish immigrant from Poland who partnered with Joe Weber as one of the most popular comedy vaudeville duos near the end of the nineteenth century. When the duo separated in 1904, Lew Fields became one of the most influential theater producers of his time. From 1904 until 1916, he produced about 40 Broadway shows, and was nicknamed "The King of Musical Comedy" because of his achievements. Her mother was Rose Harris. She had two older brothers, Joseph and Herbert, who also became successful on Broadway: Joseph as a writer and producer and Herbert as a writer who later became Dorothy's collaborator.

Despite her natural familial connections to the theatre via her father, he disapproved of her choice to pursue acting and did everything he could to prevent her from becoming a serious actress. This began when he refused to let her take a job with a stock company in Yonkers. Hence, Dorothy began working as a teacher and a laboratory assistant while secretly submitting work to magazines.

== Career ==
Early in her career Fields appeared on stage with English actress and socialite Sylvia Ashley—who subsequently married Douglas Fairbanks Sr and Clark Gable—as "Silly and Dotty" in Midnight Follies at the London Metropole, followed by further appearances in Tell me More at London's Winter Gardens and The Whole Town's Talking.

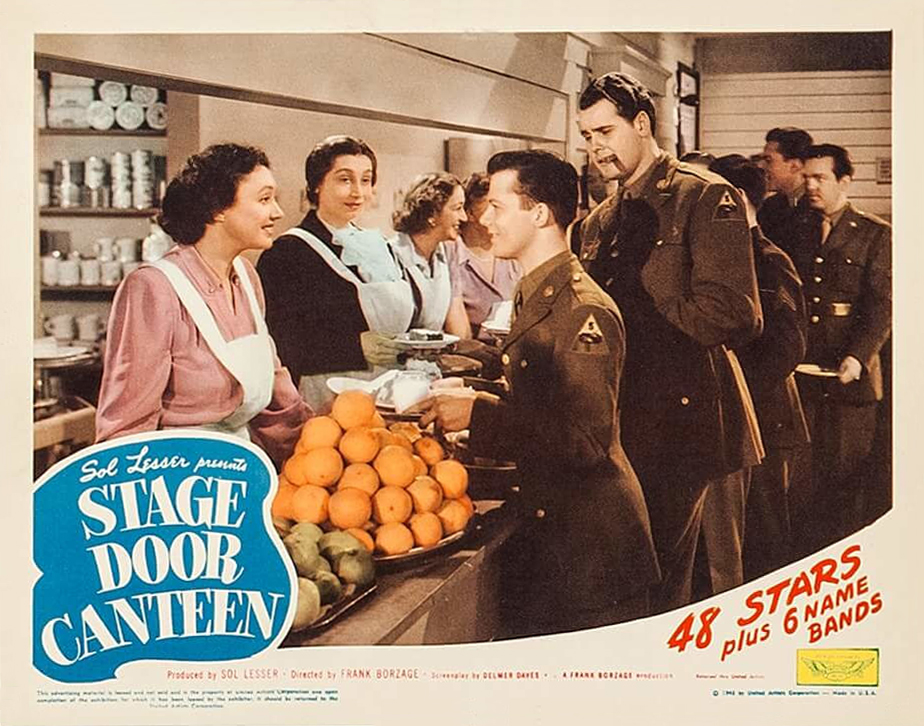
Katharine Cornell, Aline MacMahon and Dorothy Fields serve soldiers played by Lon McCallister and Michael Harrison in the film Stage Door Canteen (1943)

In 1926, Fields met the popular song composer J. Fred Coots, who proposed that the two begin writing songs together. Nothing actually came out of this interaction and introduction; however, Coots introduced Fields to another composer and song plugger, Jimmy McHugh.

Fields's career as a professional songwriter took off in 1928 when Jimmy McHugh, who had seen some of her early work, invited her to provide some lyrics for him for Blackbirds of 1928. The show, starring Adelaide Hall, became a Broadway hit. Fields and McHugh teamed up until 1935. Songs from this period include "I Can't Give You Anything But Love" (1928), "Exactly Like You" (1930), and "On the Sunny Side of the Street" (1930). During the later 1920s, she and McHugh wrote specialty numbers for the various Cotton Club revues, many of which were recorded by Duke Ellington.

In the mid-1930s, Fields started to write lyrics for films and collaborated with other composers, including Jerome Kern. With Kern, she worked on the movie version of Roberta and also on their greatest success, Swing Time. The song "The Way You Look Tonight" earned the Fields/Kern team an Academy Award for Best Original Song in 1936.

She wrote the lyrics for the songs in the 1936 movie The King Steps Out, based on the early years of Empress Elisabeth of Austria, directed by Josef von Sternberg.

Fields returned to New York and worked again on Broadway shows, but now as a librettist, first with Arthur Schwartz on Stars In Your Eyes. (They reteamed in 1951 for A Tree Grows in Brooklyn.) In the 1940s, she teamed up with her brother Herbert Fields, with whom she wrote the books for three Cole Porter shows, Let's Face It!, Something for the Boys, and Mexican Hayride.

In 1945, Fields approached Richard Rodgers and Oscar Hammerstein II with her idea for a new musical based on the life of famous female sharpshooter Annie Oakley. They liked the idea and agreed to produce the show conjointly. Kern and Fields were signed on to write the songs in the show. Kern died before the two were able to begin working on the project, and Irving Berlin was hired to replace him.

Together, she and her brother Herbert wrote the book for Annie Get Your Gun, while Berlin provided all the music. The show, starring Ethel Merman, was a huge success, running for 1,147 performances.

In the 1950s, her biggest success was the show Redhead (1959), which won five Tony Awards, including Best Musical. When she started collaborating with Cy Coleman in the 1960s, her career took a new turn. Their first work together was Sweet Charity. Her last hit was from their second collaboration in 1973, Seesaw. The show began on Broadway on March 18, 1973, and ended its run on December 8, 1973. Its signature song was "It's Not Where You Start, It's Where You Finish".

Throughout her 48-year career, Fields cowrote more than 400 songs and worked on 15 stage musicals and 26 movies. Her lyrics were known for their strong characterization, clarity in language, and humor. She was an amateur pianist and a lifelong lover of classical music; the awareness of melodic lines that this fostered in her was of value in the task of fitting lyrics to melodies.

Fields' professional longevity was rare at the time for a songwriter; it was underpinned by her imagination and her willingness to adapt to changing trends in American musical theater.

Fields is a member of the American Theater Hall of Fame, inducted posthumously in 1988.

== Personal life ==
Fields had highly disciplined work habits. She was known to spend about eight weeks researching, discussing, and making notes on a project before finally returning to her regular 8:30 a.m. to 4:00 p.m. daily work routine.

Fields died of a heart attack on March 28, 1974, at the age of 69. The New York Times reported "Dorothy Fields, the versatile songwriter whose career spanned nearly 50 years, died of a heart attack last night at her home here." She was the sister of writers Herbert and Joseph Fields. She was introduced to Eli Lahm by his close friend Herbert Sondheim, the father of Stephen Sondheim, who affectionately referred to her as Aunt Dorothy growing up. Fields married Lahm in 1939, and they had two children, David (a jazz pianist) and Eliza. Lahm died in 1958.
