= Joy in the Morning (film) =

1965 film directed by Alex Segal

- Theatrical release poster
- Directed by: Alex Segal
- Written by: Sally Benson; Alfred Hayes; Norman Lessing
- Based on: Joy in the Morning; 1963 novel by Betty Smith
- Produced by: Henry T. Weinstein
- Starring: Richard Chamberlain; Yvette Mimieux; Arthur Kennedy; Oscar Homolka; Joan Tetzel
- Cinematography: Ellsworth Fredericks
- Edited by: Thomas J. McCarthy
- Music by: Sammy Fain and Paul Francis Webster (title song); Bernard Herrmann
- Distributed by: Metro-Goldwyn-Mayer
- Release date: May 7, 1965
- Running time: 103 minutes
- Country: United States
- Language: English
- Box office: $1,700,000 (US/Canada rentals)

Joy in the Morning is a 1965 American romance film starring Richard Chamberlain and Yvette Mimieux and directed by Alex Segal. Adapted from the 1963 novel of the same name by Betty Smith, the film tells the story of a young newlywed couple, Carl and Annie Brown, who marry against their parents' wishes while Carl is still in law school and struggle to maintain their relationship.

== Plot ==
In the late 1920s, 18-year-old Annie McGairy travels from Brooklyn to a college town in the Midwest to marry her boyfriend Carl Brown, a law student, at the local courthouse. The newlyweds must overcome many obstacles, including disapproval from their parents (who knew each other before emigrating to the U.S. from Ireland), financial problems, and Annie's sexual insecurities. Due to the marriage, Carl's law school cuts off his loans; his father also cuts off financial support, forcing Carl to work multiple jobs on top of studying. Annie causes local gossip by befriending a lonely, gay florist and babysitting for the mistress of a married businessman.

Annie discovers she is pregnant, but before she can tell Carl, the couple have a heated argument caused by the stress of his night job interfering with the couple's marital intimacy. Annie returns to her mother in Brooklyn without telling Carl she is pregnant, not wanting to burden him while he finishes his education. Carl, devastated without Annie, falls behind with his studies which puts him in danger of failing his classes. When Carl's father discovers the situation, including Annie's now-obvious pregnancy, his attitude toward Annie softens, and he convinces the couple to reconcile. Annie helps Carl catch up with his studies and Carl passes his exams the same day Annie gives birth. Carl graduates, and he and Annie celebrate a church wedding with family and friends before happily riding away with their newborn son.

== Cast ==
- Richard Chamberlain – Carl Brown
- Yvette Mimieux – Annie McGairy Brown
- Arthur Kennedy – Patrick Brown
- Oskar Homolka – Stan Pulaski
- Donald Davis – Anthony Byrd
- Joan Tetzel – Beverly Karter
- Sidney Blackmer – Dean James Darwent
- Virginia Gregg – Mrs. Lorgan
- Chris Noel – Mary Ellen Kincaid
- Bartlett Robinson – Professor Victor Newcole
- Ellen Atterbury – Marriage License Clerk
- Harvey Stephens – Dr. Marson
- Ira Barmak – Dr. Kirkson

== Production ==
The film was based on the 1963 novel by Betty Smith, author of A Tree Grows in Brooklyn. Joy in the Morning, Smith's fourth and last novel, was based on her life; she married during the Depression and lived near campus while her husband studied law. "I had to return to that background", she said. "That's where I was born." (The marriage later ended in divorce.)

Film rights were bought by MGM in June 1963 for a minimum of $100,000. In January 1964, the lead role was given to Richard Chamberlain, who was at that time a teen idol and the star of the MGM TV series Dr. Kildare. His co-star was Yvette Mimieux, who was also under contract to MGM and had played Chamberlain's love interest in a two-part episode of Dr. Kildare.

Filming began in May 1964. Producer Henry Weinstein said he wanted to make a romance in the James Stewart–Margaret Sullavan tradition. Mimieux called the film "light and charming".

The film's score was composed by Bernard Herrmann. Chamberlain performed the title song, "Joy in the Morning", which was released as a single and included on his 1964 album Richard Chamberlain.

Chris Noel, who played a college student, wrote a book with editor and designer Kirk Kimball about the making of the film titled Filming Joy in the Morning: Behind the Scenes with Richard Chamberlain.

== Reception ==
The film made $1.7 million in North America.

The film has been described as "amateurishly acted (especially by stars Richard Chamberlain and Yvette Mimieux as Carl and Annie), badly written, and hideously directed ... unrelenting mawkishness". According to one report, preview audiences "laughed in all the wrong places."

== See also ==
- List of American films of 1965
