= Marcia Van Dyke =

American violinist and actress (1922–2002)

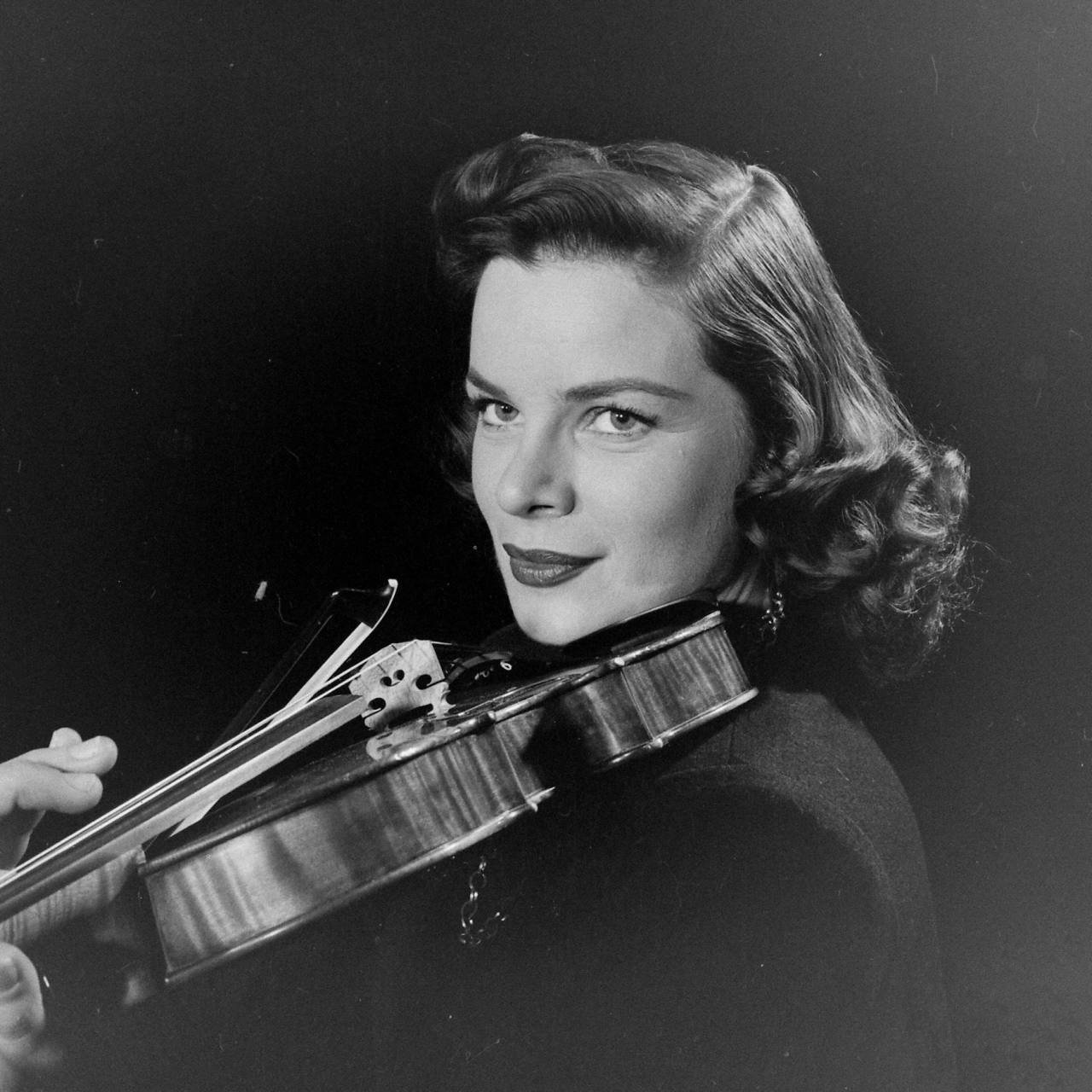
- Van Dyke in 1947
- Born: March 26, 1922; Grants Pass, Oregon, U.S.
- Died: November 11, 2002 (aged 80); Ashland, Oregon, U.S.
- Education: San Mateo Junior College
- Occupations: Violinist, actress
- Years active: 1946-1954 (film)
- Spouse(s): David Vaughn Colbert (1941-?); Jack Barry (1952-1958); John H. Mitchell (1962-?)
- Children: 2 sons

Marcia Evelyn Van Dyke (March 26, 1922 – November 11, 2002) was an American violinist and actress.

== Early years ==
Marcia Evelyn Van Dyke was born in Grants Pass, Oregon to Mr. and Mrs. Edward S. Van Dyke. Her father was an attorney who taught piano as a hobby. She was a cousin of director and writer W. S. Van Dyke.

From 1935 to 1937, newspapers in Oregon reported her recital appearances locally and in Portland, and her status as concertmistress of the Medford Junior Symphony, with whom she was featured several times as soloist.

In October 1938, Van Dyke and her parents moved to Burlingame, California so she could study under Naoum Blinder, the concert maestro of the San Francisco Symphony Orchestra. She was concertmaster for Burlingame High School and for the Southern Oregon Symphony. She graduated from BHS and San Mateo Junior College.

== Music ==
In 1944, Van Dyke joined the first violin section of the San Francisco Symphony, after having played first violin for a theater in San Francisco. With the Symphony she appeared in a tour of 56 concerts in 57 days in the spring of 1947. She was featured in a cover story in the January 19, 1948, issue of Life magazine. According to the San Francisco Chronicle's SFGate website: "After the tour, Life magazine ran a story not on the orchestra itself, but on 'the prettiest first violinist now in the symphony big time.'"

== Acting ==
=== Film ===
Film executive Joe Pasternak offered a contract to Van Dyke after seeing the article about her in Life.

Van Dyke's fledgling film career was briefly endangered on December 25, 1947, when a car in which she was a passenger collided head-on with another car near Taft, California. A news story distributed by International News Service noted that Van Dyke was "being groomed by MGM for stardom" at the time. It continued: "An ugly cut encircled her left eye and her lovely features became grotesquely swollen. For a while it looked as if Marcia's film career had been nipped in the bud." On December 30, 1947, however, she said that she was recovering rapidly enough to resume filming within a month.

Van Dyke's films included Shadow on the Wall (1950), A Date with Judy (1948), In the Good Old Summertime (1949), and Death in a Doll House.

=== Stage ===
On Broadway, Van Dyke played Katie in A Tree Grows in Brooklyn (1951). Her performance in that role brought her a Theatre World Award for 1950–1951 and a fourth-place finish for best supporting actress in the 1951 Donaldson Awards competition. After her debut in A Tree Grows in Brooklyn, an item in Billboard said, in part, "She has looks along with more than considerable acting ability, and, while her voice is small, it has splendid quality."

=== Radio ===
In 1953, Van Dyke and her then-husband, Jack Barry, starred with their son, Jeff, in It's the Barrys, a 15-minute comedy program on NBC radio.

== Coverage in Life magazine ==
Life magazine twice ran articles about Van Dyke. The May 5, 1947, issue contained an article titled "Pretty First Violinist: Young Marcia Van Dyke is a musical ornament in San Francisco Symphony's string section". It noted that Van Dyke had not only played for six years with professional orchestras, but had also sung torch songs in nightclubs.

The second article, published on January 19, 1948, was entitled "Virtuoso Starlet: 'Prettiest first violinist' now is a versatile Hollywood actress'". It was accompanied by eleven photographs and reported that Van Dyke had received a film contract with Metro-Goldwyn-Mayer. It added that she had "considerably more to offer Hollywood than her pretty face", noting her talents in singing, playing tennis, and swimming.

On January 10, 2014, Time magazine evaluated Life's coverage of Van Dyke. Liz Ronk wrote:

Van Dyke, as multi-talented as she might have been, only worked in Hollywood for six years, and never in a starring role. Still, no one could possibly consider her a failure; after all, countless young actresses yearn to act in the movies, or on television, and never get a chance to step in front of a camera. So while Marcia Van Dyke might not have had the blockbuster onscreen career that her LIFE cover suggested was in store, at least she had her moment -- in fact, she had several moments -- in the sun.

== Later years ==
In the 1970s, Van Dyke returned to the violin, playing as a session musician for a variety of artists, including Carole King, Cleo Laine, George Duke, The Gap Band, and Earth, Wind & Fire.

== Personal life ==
Van Dyke was married three times. On August 19, 1941, she married David Vaughn Colbert, a United States Marine. In July 1952, she married television game show host Jack Barry, with whom she had two sons, Jeffrey and Jonathan. On November 16, 1962, Van Dyke married John H. Mitchell, an executive with Screen Gems studios.

On November 11, 2002, Van Dyke died at her home in Ashland, Oregon. She was 80 years old.
