= Alcoholic lung disease =

Human disease

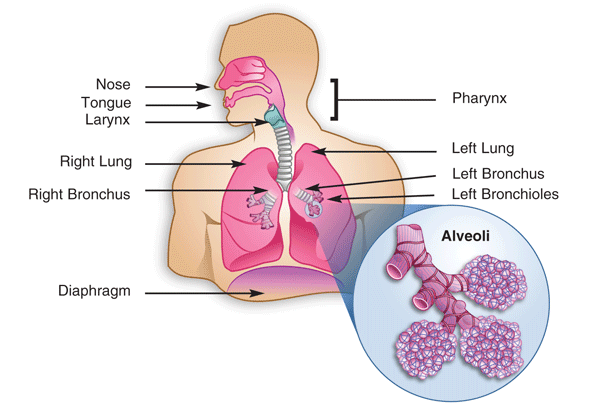
- Diagram of respiratory system
- Specialty: Respirology

Alcoholic lung disease is disease of the lungs caused by excessive alcohol. The term 'alcoholic lung disease' is not a generally accepted medical diagnosis, and "the association between alcohol abuse and acute lung injury remains largely unrecognized, even by lung researchers".

Chronic alcohol ingestion impairs multiple critical cellular functions in the lung. These cellular impairments lead to increased susceptibility to the serious complications from a pre-existing lung disease. Recent research cites alcoholic lung disease as comparable to liver disease in alcohol-related mortality. Alcoholics have a higher risk of developing acute respiratory distress syndrome (ARDS) and experience higher rates of mortality from ARDS when compared to non-alcoholics.

Alcohol use disorder can cause a susceptibility to infection after major trauma to the lungs / respiratory system. It creates an increased risk of aspiration of gastric acid, microbes from the upper part of the throat, decreased mucus-facilitated clearance of bacterial pathogens from the upper airway and impaired pulmonary host defenses. This increased colonization by pathogenic organisms, combined with the acute intoxicating effects of alcohol and the subsequent depression of the normally protective gag and cough reflexes, leads to more frequent and severe pneumonia from gram-negative organisms. Defects in the function of the upper airway's clearance mechanisms in alcoholic patients have been detected.

== Cause ==
Pneumonia is a form of acute respiratory infection that affects the lung parenchyma and oxygenation. When a patient with pneumonia is an alcoholic, the mortality rate exceeds by 50% if they are placed into intensive care (ICU). According to Kershaw, C 2008 page 1, "[a]s of 2001, pneumonia was the sixth most common cause of death in the United States".

Alcoholism increases mortality from pneumonia because of leukopenia, lower white blood cell counts, which leads to a worse infection because white blood cells help fight the bacterial infection, so lower numbers result in a less effective immune response. Alcoholics are at an increased risk for infection with tissue-damaging gram-negative pathogens or for the spread of bacteria in the blood.

== Mechanism ==
The mechanisms of alcoholic lung disease are:

- Metabolism of alcohol reduces glutathione anti-oxidant levels in the lungs.
- Oxidation damage to the cells impairs the ability of the lungs to remove fluid.
- Oxidative damage to cells reduces immune response.
- Oxidative damage to cells results in a reduced ability to recover from injury.

These chemical changes compound the negative mechanical and microbiological effects of alcoholism on the respiratory system. These include impaired gag reflex and cilia function and greater likelihood of colonies of pneumococcal bacteria in the upper respiratory system.

== Diagnosis ==
=== Differential diagnosis ===
Although lung damage from concurrent smoking and drug use is often indistinguishable from alcoholic lung disease, there is support for considering alcoholic lung disease as an independent syndrome. Over the last decade, evidence from epistemological studies show that hazardous alcohol use alone can increase by as much as fourfold the risk for acute respiratory distress syndrome.

== See also ==
- Alcohol-induced respiratory reactions
