= Joy in the Morning (Smith novel) =

Book by Betty Smith

- First edition cover
- Author: Betty Smith
- Language: English
- Publisher: Harper & Row
- Publication date: 1963
- Publication place: United States
- Media type: Print (hardcover and paperback)
- Pages: 277

Joy in the Morning is a novel by Betty Smith, first published in 1963. The book follows the first year of the marriage of Brooklynites Annie McGairy and Carl Brown in 1927. It is based on Smith's own experience of marrying young to a husband who was a law student.

== Plot ==
Annie is 18 and Carl 20. Although both of their families are against their marriage, the couple weds anyway. Part of Annie's reason for marrying is to get away from her stepfather, who is sexually abusive. Annie and Carl move into a rented room near the college campus where Carl is enrolled in law school.

The novel deals with the first years of a couple who married young, Carl’s struggle to continue and keep up with his studies while he supports a spouse, and Annie’s struggle to learn the basic housekeeping skills then expected of a wife, contribute to their income despite her lack of job skills, and attempts to better herself through education.

The college dean, initially skeptical of his student’s youthful marriage, approves of their willingness to work and bear their hardships, and befriends them. He offers helps from time to time, encouraging Annie to audit classes and finds a job for Carl that better accommodates his class schedule.

Annie befriends various townspeople, such as the grocer and florist. She audits a college writing class and tries to improve her education, and finds a job working in a dime store. The young couple manages to get by until Annie falls pregnant.

Carl’s overbearing mother disapproved of their courtship and marriage, accusing Annie of promiscuity. Annie’s mother accused her of eloping over pregnancy, so Annie keeps it secret for awhile. The Dean helps Annie get medical care for free at the university’s teaching hospital.

Annie and Carl manage to navigate youthful marriage and parenthood until Carl graduates. A friend of the Dean asks him to find someone, preferably married, to take over his law practice for a year while the friend travels. The Dean recommends Carl, pointing out that a year of general law practice will benefit him. When the year is up he will help Carl enter a local law firm while Annie attends university as a special student. Annie, Carl, and their child head off to the new law job with hopes for a happy future.

== Style and editing ==
It is told with third-person, limited narration from Annie's perspective.

It is "notable for its racy sex scenes".

Smith was not pleased when she learned that the editors felt the book was much too long and cut nearly a quarter of the manuscript during the final edit.

== Adaptation ==
The book was made into a film in 1965, starring Richard Chamberlain and Yvette Mimieux. The film has been described as "amateurishly acted ... badly written, and hideously directed ... unrelenting mawkishness".
