= Shelter (Olivia Chaney album) =

Studio album by Olivia Chaney
- Released: 15 June 2018
- Length: 44:17
- Label: Nonesuch
- Producer: Thomas Bartlett

Olivia Chaney chronology
The Queen of Hearts (2017)	Shelter (2018)

Professional ratings
Aggregate scores
Source	Rating
Metacritic	81/100
Review scores
Source	Rating
AllMusic	4/5 stars
Exclaim!	8/10
The Guardian	4/5 stars
The Line of Best Fit	7.5/10
Paste	7.4/10

Shelter is the second studio album by English folk musician Olivia Chaney. It was released on 15 June 2018, by Nonesuch Records.

== Production ==
To write the album, Olivia went to an 18th-century cottage in North Yorkshire for inspiration. The album was produced by American musician Thomas Bartlett.

== Release ==
On 13 April 2018, Chaney announced the release of her new album, along with the single "IOU". The music video was directed by Matthew Edginton.

== Critical reception ==
Shelter was met with "universal acclaim" reviews from critics. At Metacritic, which assigns a weighted average rating out of 100 to reviews from mainstream publications, this release received an average score of 81 based on 9 reviews. Aggregator Album of the Year gave the release a 79 out of 100 based on a critical consensus of 9 reviews.

James Christopher Monger from AllMusic said: "Chaney's robust voice commands the room, deftly weaving between the intersecting lanes of vulnerability and raw power with remarkable poise, especially on standout cuts like "Dragonfly," "Roman Holiday," and "A Tree Grows in Brooklyn." Sarah Greene of Exclaim! said of the release: "Chaney's music draws from folk, classical and traditional music, and her songs have a contemporary vantage point that glances forwards and backwards in time. She moves with ease from nearly operatic to contemporary and casual and sounds equally at home" Hannah Jocelyn of The Line of Best Fit explained: "Shelter is a humble, somewhat sparse album that will captivate anyone who gives it the appropriate time. Stately but still emotionally resonant, it’s a masterclass in updating folk music."

== Track listing ==
Shelter track listing
No.	Title	Length
1.	"Shelter"	4:16
2.	"Dragonfly"	4:35
3.	"Arches"	6:09
4.	"IOU"	4:05
5.	"A Tree Grows in Brooklyn"	4:33
6.	"Colin and Clem"	5:01
7.	"O Solitude"	4:05
8.	"Long Time Gone"	3:17
9.	"Roman Holiday"	4:13
10.	"House on a Hill"	4:03

== Personnel ==
Musician

- Olivia Chaney – primary artist, guitar
- Frank Harford – backing vocals
- Jordan Hunt – vocals, backing vocals

Production

- Thomas Bartlett – engineer, producer
- Patrick Dillett – engineer, mixing
- James Yost – engineer
- Greg Calbi – mastering
