= A Tree Grows in Brooklyn (musical) =

American stage musical

- Original Cast Recording
- Music: Arthur Schwartz
- Lyrics: Dorothy Fields
- Book: George Abbott; Betty Smith
- Basis: Betty Smith's novel A Tree Grows in Brooklyn (novel)
- Productions: 1951 Broadway

A Tree Grows in Brooklyn is a musical with a book by George Abbott and Betty Smith, lyrics by Dorothy Fields, and music by Arthur Schwartz.

First produced in 1951, the musical is based on Smith's autobiographical novel A Tree Grows in Brooklyn (1943), but when Shirley Booth was cast as Aunt Cissy (spelled Sissy in the book), a secondary character in the novel, the prominence of this role was expanded and tailored to Booth's comedic talents, diminishing the relative importance of other characters, in particular young Francie, through whose eyes the plot of the novel unfolds.

== Productions ==
After two previews, the Broadway production, directed by Abbott and choreographed by Herbert Ross, opened on April 19, 1951, at the Alvin Theatre, where it ran for 267 performances. In addition to Booth, the cast included Johnnie Johnston as Johnny, Marcia Van Dyke as Katie, and Nomi Mitty as Francie. Van Dyke was honored with a Theatre World Award. The musical director was Max Goberman.

Booth's performance proved to be both an asset and detriment to the production, since it was an audience pleaser but detracted from what should have been the story's primary focus, the struggles faced by Johnny and Katie as their marriage slowly crumbles. Frank Rizzo, in Variety, gave his opinion about the failure of the original production: "The musical’s failure was largely blamed on a script too tailored to accommodate the comic talents of Shirley Booth, in what was essentially a supporting role. But the show ... made other missteps. The arrival of the book’s most appealing character — young Francie Nolan — was unnecessarily delayed, and an elaborate nightmare Halloween ballet in the second act, depicting the final descent of her goodhearted but alcoholic father Johnny Nolan, was a mistake."

Goodspeed Opera House mounted a revised production relegating Aunt Cissy to a supporting role in 2003.

An Encores! staged concert production at New York City Center in 2005 starred Emily Skinner as Cissy, Jason Danieley as Johnny and Sally Murphy as Katie.

A cast recording of the original production is available on a compact disc released by Sony.

== Synopsis ==
=== Act One ===
The musical opens on a Saturday morning when the community is getting the week's pay (Payday). Hildy is waiting with her friend Katie for her boyfriend Johnny Nolan. While they wait they switch hats. Johnny arrives (Mine Till Monday) and thinks Katie is Hildy as Katie is wearing Hildy's hat and kisses her. Hildy angrily leaves. Meanwhile, Cissy, Katie's sister, hopes to marry Oscar, who would be her tenth husband, all of who she calls Harry after her first who left when he had to go back to his other wife. Oscar agrees to marry her if she can produce a baby. Katie and Johnny decide to marry (Make the Man Love Me) and Johnny resolves to quit drinking and spending money at saloons (I'm Like a New Broom). Johnny gets drunk anyway and doesn't have enough money to pay for their first piece of furniture, a bed. Katie pays for it, giving up having a grand wedding in church (Looks who Dancing). Meanwhile, Hildy has ended up marrying Aloysius (Mine Next Monday). Cissy pretends she is pregnant and has Johnny and Katie smuggle in an adopted baby while she sends Oscar away repeatedly to fetch food (Love is the Reason). Katie has had to get a job as a janitress to support herself, Johnny, and their daughter Francie. Johnny, who disappeared for two days, reappears during a rooftop party (If You Haven't Got A Sweetheart). Johnny tells Katie he got a job as a piano player and that sings will be better for them (I'll Buy You A Star).

=== Act Two - 12 Years Later ===
As the curtain rises on Act Two an old clothes man passes through an alley (That's How it Goes). Francie Nolan is teased by the other children until Katie comes to her defense. Cissy is excited to meet her first husband after his other wife has died, and narrates his qualities to Francie (He Had Refinement). Johnny is hoping to win a raffle at his job for a piano, which he hopes to give to Francie. He comforts Francie when she realizes that she no longer wants to make believe (Growing Pains). Cissy and her first Harry meet and are disgusted by each other and Cissy's beloved Oscar walks in on the scene, suspects the worst, and abandons Cissy (Is That My Prince?). At the raffle, Johnny wins, but is refused the prize as the rules forbid employees receiving the prize and he is thrown out. A surreal ballet chronicles his resulting downfall. Johnny leaves Katie and Francie to find work in the city (Don't Be Afraid of Anything). Cissy and Oscar reconcile and Cissy reveals that she pregnant with Oscar's child. Katie receives news that Johnny has been killed. She uses the money he left for her to buy flowers for Francie's graduation, making Francie the first person in the family to graduate (Finale).

== Musical Numbers ==
Act I

- "Payday" – The Company
- "Mine Til Monday" – Johnny Nolan, Hildy and Company
- "Make the Man Love Me" – Katie and Johnny Nolan
- "I'm Like a New Broom" – Johnny Nolan and Friends
- "Look Who's Dancing" – Katie, Cissy, Johnny Nolan, Allie, Willie, Petey, Girl in Mae's Place and Dancers
- "Make the Man Love Me (Reprise)" – Katie
- "Love is the Reason" – Cissy
- "Mine Next Monday" – Aloysius
- "If You Haven't Got a Sweetheart" – Dancer and Company
- "I'll Buy You a Star" – Johnny Nolan and Company

Act II

- "That's How It Goes" – Old Clothes Man, Maudie, Moriarity and Company
- "He Had Refinement" – Cissy
- "Growing Pains" – Johnny Nolan and Francie
- "Is That My Prince?" – Cissy and Swansine
- "Halloween (Ballet)" – Johnny Nolan, Petey, Allie, Willie, Dancer, Child and Singer
- "Don't Be Afraid Of Anything" – Johnny Nolan
- "I'm Like a New Broom (Reprise)" – Johnny Nolan
- "Love Is the Reason (Reprise)" – Cissy and Harry
- "Look Who's Dancing (Reprise)" – Harry and Child
- "Finale: I'll Buy You a Star (Reprise)" – The Company
